= Nickel compounds =

Any chemical compound having at least one nickel atom

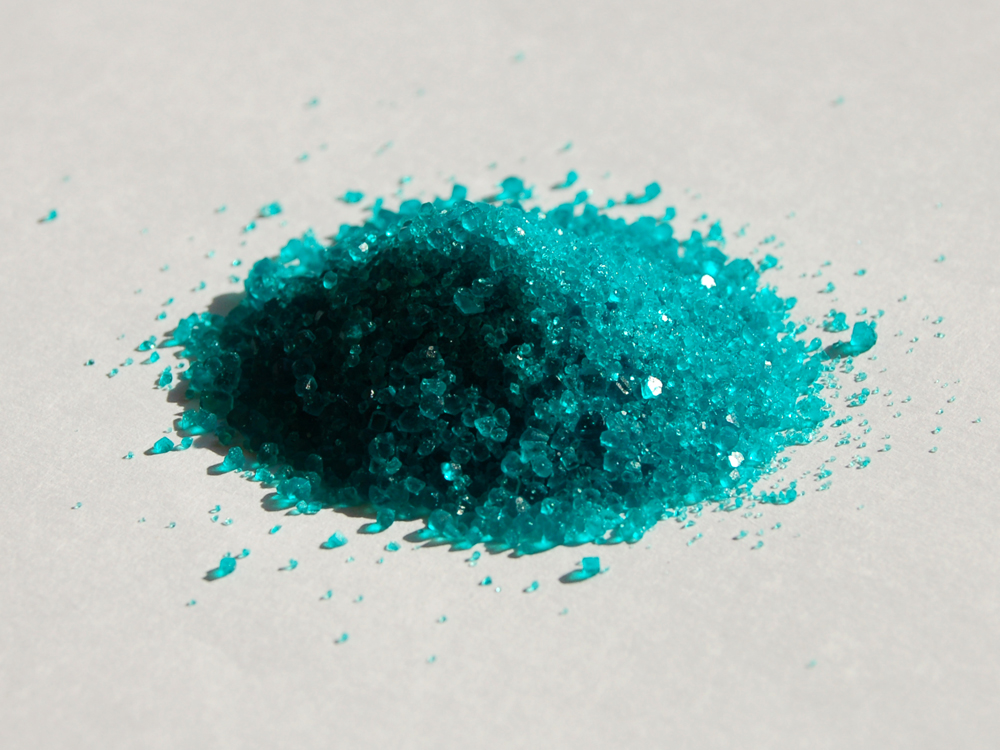
A sample of nickel(II) sulfate hexahydrate, a compound of nickel

Nickel compounds are chemical compounds containing the element nickel which is a member of the group 10 of the periodic table. Most compounds in the group have an oxidation state of +2. Nickel is classified as a transition metal with nickel(II) having much chemical behaviour in common with iron(II) and cobalt(II). Many salts of nickel(II) are isomorphous with salts of magnesium due to the ionic radii of the cations being almost the same. Nickel forms many coordination complexes. Nickel tetracarbonyl was the first pure metal carbonyl produced, and is unusual in its volatility. Metalloproteins containing nickel are found in biological systems.

Nickel forms simple binary compounds with non metals including halogens, chalcogenides, and pnictides. Nickel ions can act as a cation in salts with many acids, including common oxoacids. Salts of the hexaaqua ion (Ni · 6 H_{2}O^{2+}) are especially well known. Many double salts containing nickel with another cation are known. There are organic acid salts. Nickel can be part of a negatively charged ion (anion) making what is called a nickellate. Numerous quaternary compounds (with four elements) of nickel have been studied for superconductivity properties, as nickel is adjacent to copper and iron in the periodic table can form compounds with the same structure as the high-temperature superconductors that are known.

== Colour ==
Most of the common salts of nickel are green due to the presence of hexaaquanickel(II) ion, Ni(H_{2}O)_{6}^{2+}.

== Geometry ==
Nickel atoms can connect to surrounding atoms or ligands in a variety of ways. Six coordinated nickel is the most common and is octahedral, but this can be distorted if ligands are not equivalent. For four coordinate nickel arrangements can be square planar, or tetrahedral. Five coordinated nickel is rarer.

== Magnetism ==
Some nickel compounds are ferromagnetic at sufficiently low temperatures. In order to show magnetic properties the nickel atoms have to be close enough together in the solid structure.

== Binary compounds ==
A binary compound of nickel contains one other element. Substances that contain only nickel atoms are not actually compounds.

In a noble gas matrix, nickel can form dimers, a molecule with two nickel atoms: Ni_{2}. Ni_{2} has a bonding energy of 2.07±0.01 eV. For Ni_{2}^{+} the bond energy is around 3.3 eV. Nickel dimers and other clusters can also be formed in a gas and plasma phase by shooting a powerful laser at a nickel rod in cold helium gas.

=== Oxides ===
Nickel oxides include Nickel(II) oxide and Nickel(III) oxide.

=== Hydroxides ===
Nickel hydroxides are used in nickel–cadmium and Nickel–metal hydride batteries. Nickel(II) hydroxide Ni(OH)_{2}, the main hydroxide of nickel is coloured apple green. It is known as the mineral theophrastite. β-NiO(OH) is a black powder with nickel in the +3 oxidation state. It can be made by oxidising nickel nitrate in a cold alkaline solution with bromine. A mixed oxidation state hydroxide Ni_{3}O_{2}(OH)_{4} is made if oxidation happens in a hot alkaline solution. A Ni^{4+} hydroxide: nickel peroxide hydrate NiO_{2} · H_{2}O, can be made by oxidising with alkaline peroxide. It is black, and unstable and oxidises water.

=== Halides ===
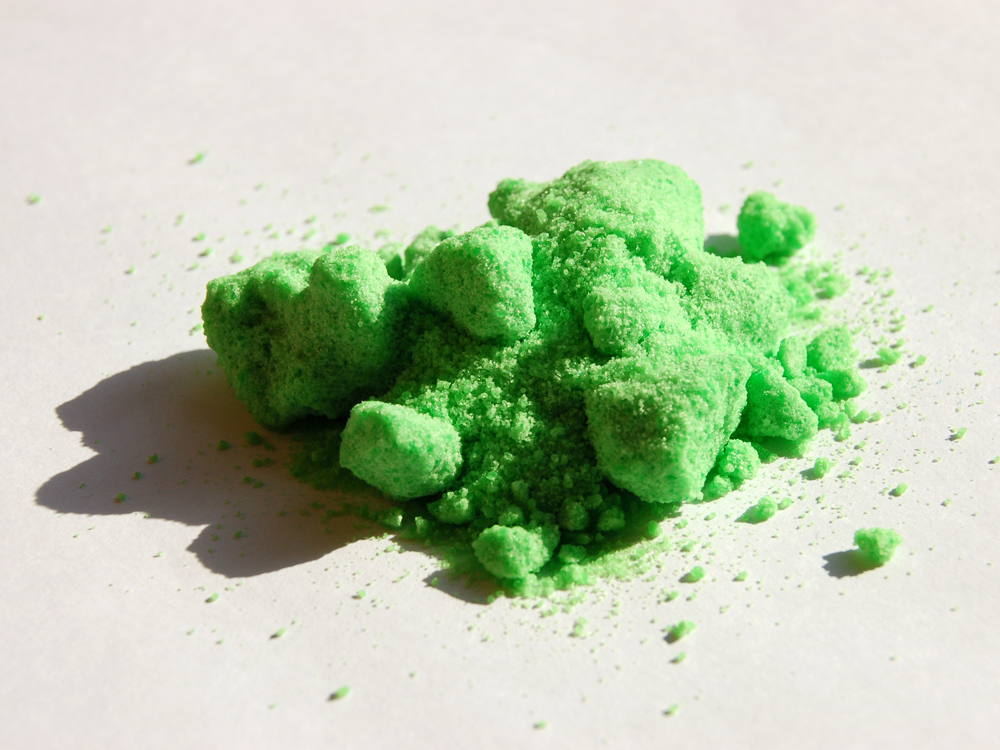
nickel chloride hexahydrate

Nickel(II) fluoride NiF_{2} is yellow, crystallising in the rutile structure and can form a trihydrate, NiF_{2}·3H_{2}O. A tetrahydrate also exists.

Nickel(III) fluoride NiF_{3} and Nickel(IV) fluoride NiF_{4} also exist.

Nickel chloride NiCl_{2} is yellow, crystallising in the cadmium chloride structure. It can form a hexahydrate, NiCl_{2}·6H_{2}O, a tetrahydrate NiCl_{2}·4H_{2}O over 29 °C and a dihydrate, NiCl_{2}·2H_{2}O over 64 °C. Ammine complexes like hexaamminenickel chloride also exist.

Nickel bromide NiBr_{2} is yellow, also crystallising in the cadmium chloride structure. It can form a hexahydrate, NiBr_{2}·6H_{2}O. Crystallisation above 29° forms a trihydrate NiBr_{2}·3H_{2}O, and a dihydrate NiBr_{2}·2H_{2}O. Nonahydrate, NiBr_{2}·9H_{2}O can crystallise from water below 2 °C. Nickelous hexammine bromide Ni(NH_{3})_{6}Br_{2}is violet or blue. It is soluble in boiling aqueous ammonia, but is insoluble in cold. Diammine, monoammine, and dihydrazine nickel bromides also exist.

With four bromide atoms, nickel(II) forms a series of salts called tetrabromonickelates.

Nickel iodide NiI_{2} is black, also crystallising in the cadmium chloride structure. It can form a green hexahydrate, NiI_{2}·6H_{2}O. Nickel iodide has a brown diammine NiI_{2}•2NH_{3} and a bluish-violet hexammine NiI_{2}•6NH_{3}.

=== Chalcogenides ===
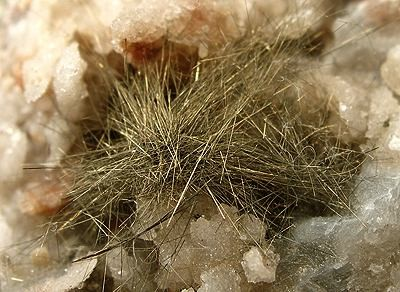
needles of Halls Gap Millerite

By reacting nickel with chalcogens, nickel sulfide, nickel selenide, and nickel telluride are formed. There are numerous sulfides: Ni_{1.5}S, Ni_{17}S_{18}, Ni_{3}S_{2} (heazlewoodite), Ni_{3}S_{4} (polydymite), Ni_{9}S_{8} (godlevskite), NiS (millerite) and two other NiS forms, NiS_{2} (vaesite) in pyrite structure. Black nickel tetrasulfide NiS_{4} is formed from ammonium polysulfide and nickel in water solution. Mixed and double sulfides of nickel also exist. Nickel with selenium forms several compounds Ni_{1−x}Se 0≤x≤0.15, Ni_{2}Se_{3}, NiSe_{2} also known as a mineral penroseite.

Nickel forms two different polonides by heating nickel and polonium together: NiPo and NiPo_{2}.

=== Pnictides ===
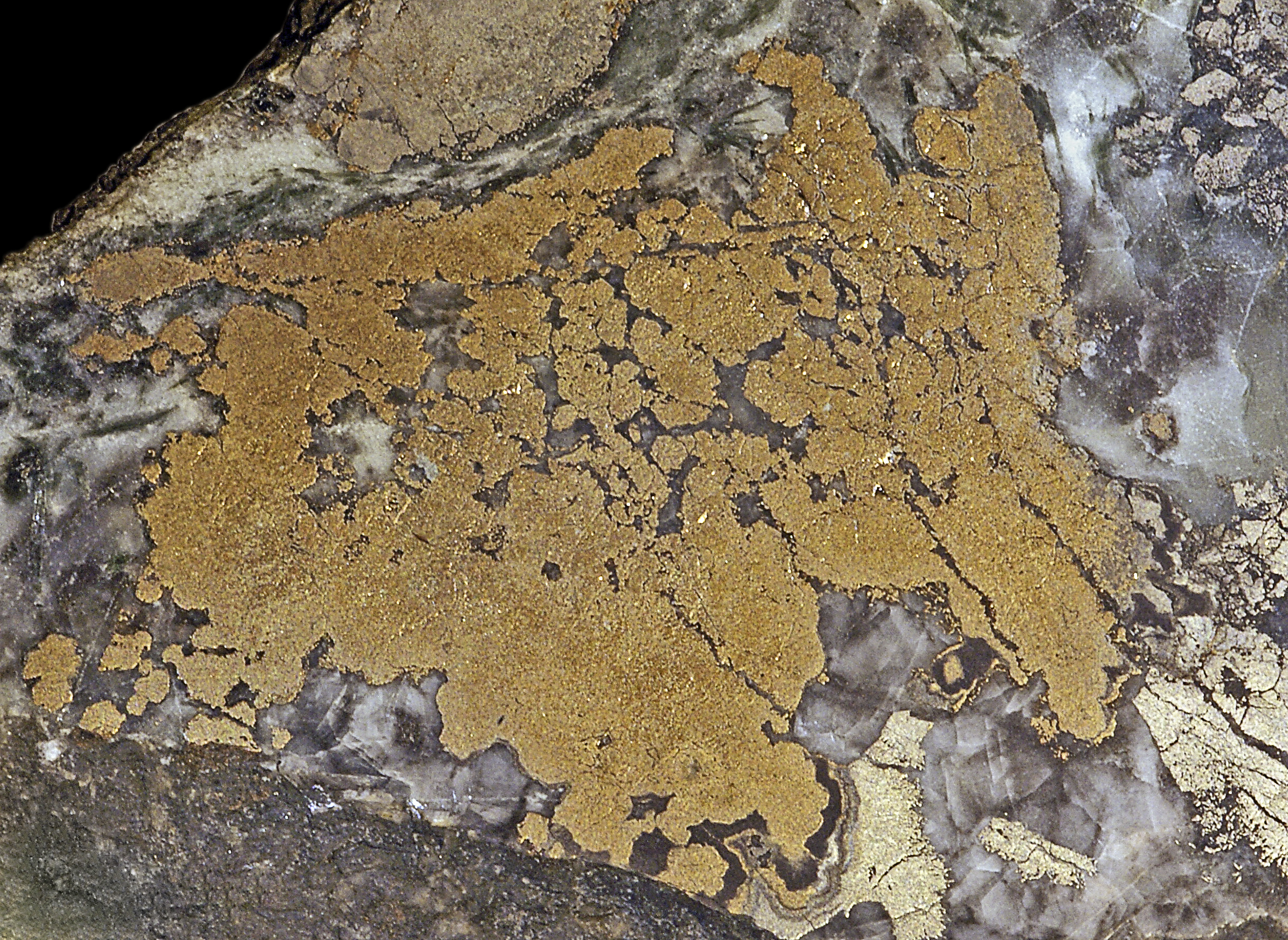
The nickel arsenide nickeline

Non-stoichiometric compounds of nickel with phosphorus, arsenic and antimony exist, and some are found in nature. One interstitial nitride has formula Ni_{3}N (hexagonal P6322, Z = 2, a = 4.6224 Å and c = 4.3059 Å). In a solid nitrogen matrix, nickel atoms combine with nitrogen molecules to yield Ni(N_{2})_{4}.

Nickel phosphide Ni_{2}P has density 7.33 and melts at 1100 °C.

The mineral Nickelskutterudite has formula NiAs_{2-3}, nickeline has formula NiAs and breithauptite has formula NiSb. NiAs melts at 967° and has density 7.77. NiSb melts at 1174°. It has the highest density of a nickel compound at 8.74 g/cm^{3}.

NiAsS gersdorffite, and NiSbS ullmannite, NiAsSe Jolliffeite are pnictide/chalcogenide compounds that occur as minerals.

=== Other ===
Nickel also forms carbides and borides. Nickel borides include forms Ni_{2}B (a green/black solid), NiB, Ni_{3}B, o-Ni_{4}B_{3} and m-Ni_{4}B_{3}.

Nickel hydride NiH is only stable under high pressures of hydrogen.

Nickel silicides include Ni_{3}Si, Ni_{31}Si_{12}, Ni_{2}Si, Ni_{3}Si_{2}, NiSi and NiSi_{2}. Nickel silicides are used in microelectronics.

=== Diatomic molecules ===
Hot nickel vapour reacting with other atoms in the gas phase can produce molecules consisting of two atoms. These can be studied by their emission spectrum. The nickel monohalides are well studied.

== Alloys ==
Compounds of nickel with other metals can be called alloys. The substances with fixed composition include nickel aluminide (NiAl) melting at 1638° with hexagonal structure. NiY, NiY_{3}, Ni_{3}Y, Ni_{4}Y, NiGd_{3},

BaNi_{2}Ge_{2} changes structure from orthorhombic to tetragonal around 480 °C. This is a ternary intermetallic compound. Others include BaNiSn_{3} and the superconductors SrNi_{2}Ge_{2}, SrNi_{2}P_{2}, SrNi_{2}As_{2}, BaNi_{2}P_{2}, BaNi_{2}As_{2}.

== Simple salts ==
=== Oxo acid salts ===
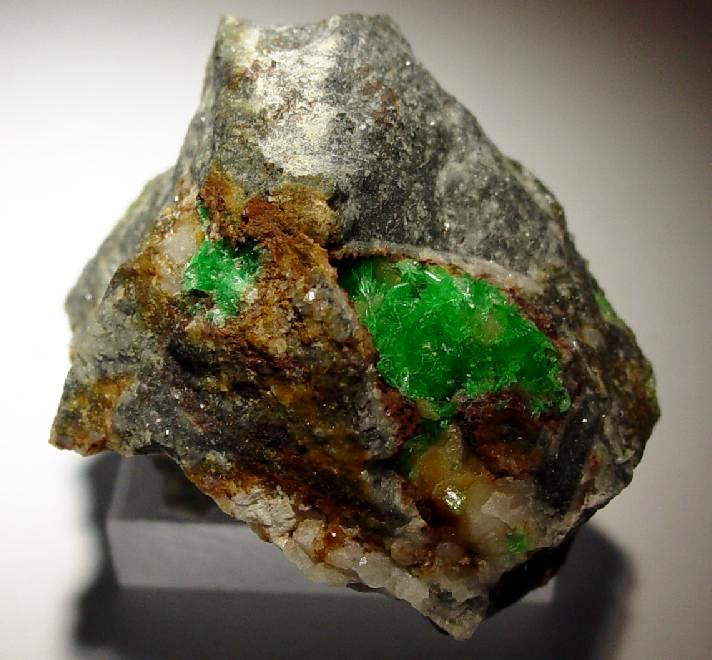
Mint green Annabergite, a nickel arsenite

Important nickel oxo acid salts include nickel(II) sulfate can crystallise with six water molecules yielding Retgersite or with seven making Morenosite which is isomorphic to Epsom salts. These contain the hexaquanickel(II) ion. There is also an anhydrous form, a dihydrate and a tetrahydrate, the last two crystallised from sulfuric acid. The hexahydrate has two forms, a blue tetragonal form, and a green monoclinic form, with a transition temperature around 53 °C. The heptahydrate crystallises from water below 31.5 above this blue hexahydrate forms, and above 53.3 the green form. Heating nickel sulfate dehydrates it, and then 700° it loses sulfur trioxide, sulfur dioxide and oxygen. Other important nickel compounds in this class are nickel carbonate, nickel nitrate, and nickel phosphate

=== Fluoro acid salts ===
Nickel tetrafluoroborate, Ni(BF_{4})_{2} · 6 H_{2}O is very soluble in water, alcohol and acetonitrile. It is prepared by dissolving nickel carbonate in tetrafluoroboric acid. Nickel tetrafluoroberyllate NiBeF_{4}•xH_{2}O, can be hydrated with six or seven water molecules. Both nickel hexafluorostannate NiSnF_{6}.6H_{2}O and nickel fluorosilicate NiSiF_{6}.6H_{2}O crystallise in the trigonal system. Nickel hexafluorogermanate NiGeF_{6} has a rosy-tan colour and a hexagonal crystal with a = 5.241 Å unit cell volume is 92.9 Å^{3}. It is formed in the reaction with GeF_{4} and K_{2}NiF_{6}. Nickel fuorotitanate NiTiF_{6}.6H_{2}O crystallises in hexagonal green crystals. It can be made by dissolving nickel carbonate, and titanium dioxide in hydrofluoric acid. The crystal dimensions are a = 9.54, c = 9.91 density = 2.09 (measure 2.03).

Ni(AsF_{6})_{2}, Ni(SbF_{6})_{2}, Ni(BiF_{6})_{2} are made by reacting the hexafluoro acid with NiF_{2} in hydrofluoric acid. They all have hexagonal crystal structure, resembling the similar salts of the other first row transition metals. For Ni(AsF_{6})_{2} a = 4.98, c = 26.59, and V = 571, formula weight Z=3. Ni(SbF_{6})_{2} is yellow with a = 5.16Å, c = 27.90Å Z = 3. The structure resembles LiSbF_{6}, but with every second metal along the c axis missing.

Others include the green fluorohafnate NiHfF_{6} · 6 H_{2}O, and Ni_{2}HfF_{8} · 12 H_{2}O, NiZrF_{6} · 6 H_{2}O

=== Chloroacid salts ===
Nickel tetrachloroiodate Ni(ICl_{4})_{2} can be made by reacting iodine with nickel chloride and chlorine gas. It consists of green needles.

=== Nitrogen anion salts ===
Nickel cyanide tetrahydrate Ni(CN)_{2} · 4 H_{2}O is insoluble in water, but dissolves in aqueous ammonia. It forms double salts with interesting structures.

Nickel azide Ni(N_{3})_{2} is a sensitive explosive. It can be made by treating nickel carbonate with hydrazoic acid. Acetone causes the precipitation of the hydrous solid salt, which is green. At 490K it slowly decomposes to nitrogen and nickel metal powder, losing a half of the nitrogen in four hours. Nickel azide is complexed by one azo group when dissolved in water, but in other solvents, the nickel atom can have up to four azo groups attached. Nickel azide forms a dihydrate: Ni(N_{3})_{2} · 2 H_{2}O and a basic salt called nickel hydroxy azide Ni(OH)N_{3}.

Nickel amide, Ni(NH_{2})_{2} is a deep red compound that contains Ni_{6} clusters surrounded by 12 NH_{2} groups. Nickel amide also forms a series of double salts. Other homoleptic nickel amides derived by substituting the hydrogen atoms are Ni[N(C_{6}H_{5})_{2}]_{2} (diphenyl) and boryl amides Ni[NBMes_{2}Mes]_{2} and Ni[NBMes_{2}C_{6}H_{5}]_{2}.

=== Organic acid salts ===
Nickel forms many known salts with organic acids. In many of these the ionised organic acid acts as a ligand.

== Double salts ==
Nickel is one of the metals that can form Tutton's salts. The singly charged ion can be any of the full range of potassium, rubidium, cesium, ammonium ($\ce{NH4}$), or thallium. As a mineral the ammonium nickel salt, (NH_{4})_{2}Ni(SO_{4})_{2} · 6 H_{2}O, can be called nickelboussingaultite. With sodium, the double sulfate is nickelblödite Na_{2}Ni(SO_{4})_{2} · 4 H_{2}O from the blödite family. Nickel can be substituted by other divalent metals of similar sized to make mixtures that crystallise in the same form.

Nickel forms double salts with Tutton's salt structure with tetrafluoroberyllate with the range of cations of ammonia, potassium, rubidium, cesium, and thallium.

Anhydrous salts of the formula M_{2}Ni_{2}(SO_{4})_{3}, which can be termed metal nickel trisulfates, belong to the family of langbeinites. The known salts include (NH_{4})_{2}Ni_{2}(SO_{4})_{3}, K_{2}Ni_{2}(SO_{4})_{3} and Rb_{2}Ni_{2}(SO_{4})_{3}, and those of Tl and Cs are predicted to exist.

Some minerals are double salts, for example Nickelzippeite Ni_{2}(UO_{2})_{6}(SO_{4})_{3}(OH)_{10} · 16H_{2}O which is isomorphic to cobaltzippeite, magnesiozippeite and zinczippeite, part of the zippeite group.

Double hydrides of nickel exist, such as Mg_{2}NiH_{4}.

=== Ternary chalcogenides ===
Nickel forms a series of double nickel oxides with other elements, which may be termed "nickelates". There are also many well defined double compounds with sulfur, selenium and tellurium.

=== Ternary pnictides ===
Ternary pnictides that contain nickel are metallic and include MgNi_{2}Bi_{4}, SrNi_{2}P_{2}, SrNi_{2}As_{2}, BaNi_{2}P_{2}, and BaNi_{2}As_{2}.

=== Ternary halides ===
Nickel can form anions and salts with halogens including the hexafluoronickelates, and tetrafluoronickelates, tetrachloronickelates, tetrabromonickelates and tetraiodonickelates. The subiodide Bi_{12}Ni_{4}I_{3} is also known.

=== Polyoxometallates ===
Nickel can enter into metal oxygen clusters with other high oxidation state elements to form polyoxometalates. These may stabilize higher oxidation states of nickel, or show catalytic properties.

Nonamolybdonickelate(IV), [NiMo_{9}O_{32}]^{6−} can oxidize aromatic hydrocarbons to alcohols.

There is a dark brown heptamolybdonickelate(IV) potassium salt, K_{2}H_{8}NiMo_{7}O_{28}·6H_{2}O.

13-Vanadonickelate(IV) compounds such as K_{7}NiV_{13}O_{38} · 16 H_{2}O with black octahedral crystals exist. It can be made from isopolyvanadate, with nickel(II) oxidised by peroxydisulfate at a pH around 4. Nickel(IV) heteropolyniobates such as the dark maroon Na_{12}NiNb_{12}O_{38} · 21 H_{2}O are also known. An alternate orange red hydrate perhaps with 44 water molecules also exists. With nickel-II (tetramethylammonium)_{6}[H_{3}NiNb_{9}O_{28} · 17 H_{2}O forms a green salt that is very soluble in water, but hardly soluble in ethanol.

H_{43}K_{14}Na_{6}Nb_{32} Ni_{10}O_{183} is a nickel-cation-bridged polyoxoniobate which crystallizes in the monoclinic system with cell dimensions a=15.140 b=24.824 c=25.190 Å and β=103.469 and two formulas per unit cell.

Na_{8}Li_{12}[Ni_{2}(P_{2}W_{15}O_{56})_{2}] · 74 H_{2}O forms a sandwich structure, and Na_{4}Li_{5}[Ni_{3}(OH)_{3}(H_{2}O)_{3}P_{2}W_{16}O_{59}] · 48 H_{2}O is a Wells-Dawson polyoxometalate.

== Acidic salts ==
Nickel hydrofluoride, H_{5}NiF_{7}·6H_{2}O is made by using excess hydrofluoric acid solution on nickel carbonate. It is deep green.

== Basic salts ==
Nickel oxyfluoride Ni_{4}F_{4}O(OH)_{2} is green.

Nickelous enneaoxydiiodide 9NiO•Nil_{2} · 15 H_{2}O forms when solutions of nickel iodide are exposed to air and evaporated.

== Complexes ==
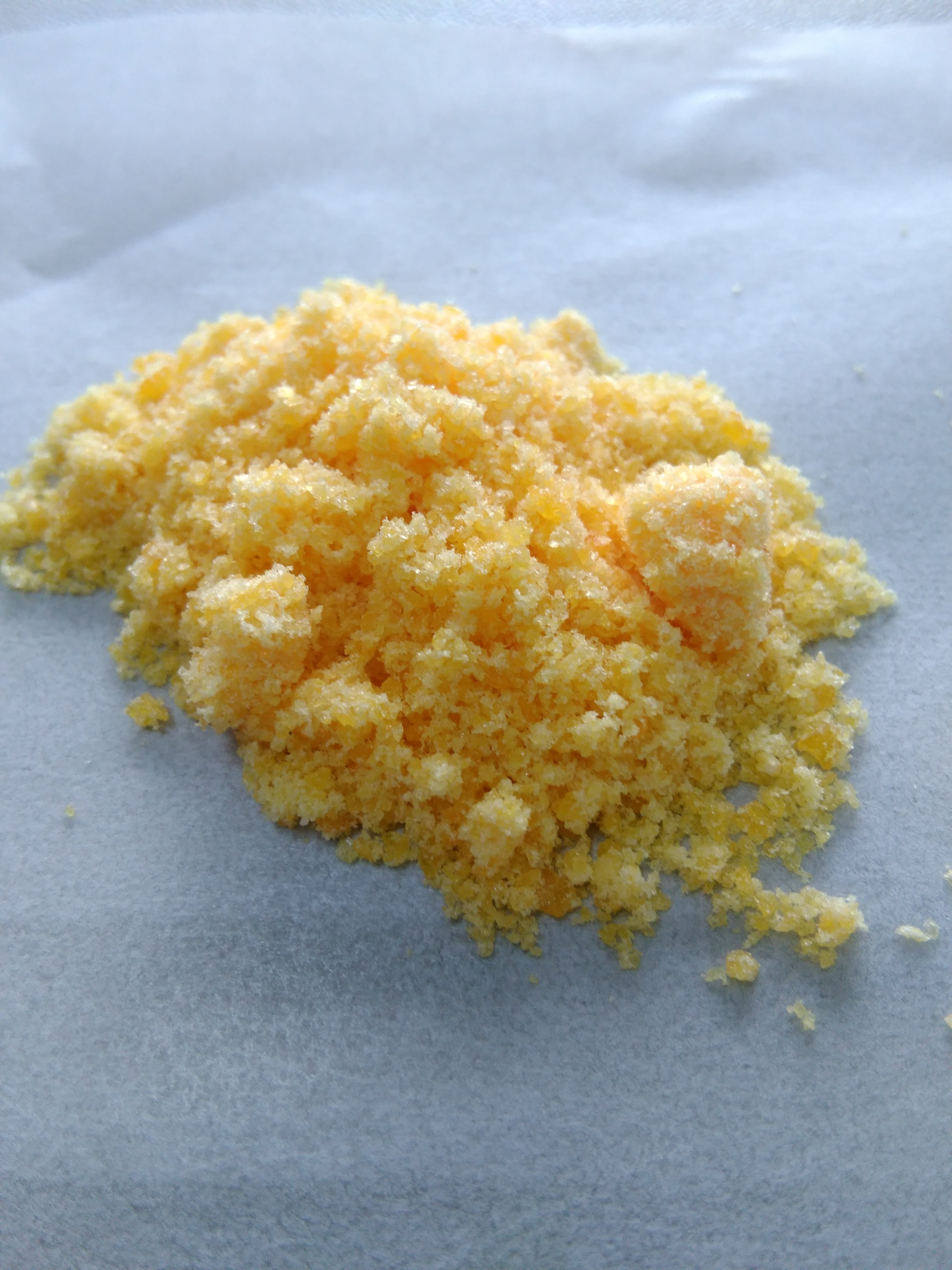
Sample of potassium tetracyanonickelate hydrate

Simple complexes of nickel include hexaquonickel(II), yellow tetracyanonickelate [Ni(CN)_{4}]^{2−}, red pentacyanonickelate [Ni(CN)_{5}]^{3−} only found in solution, [Ni(SCN)_{4}]^{2−} and [Ni(SCN)_{6}]^{4−}. Halo- complexes include [NiCl_{4}]^{2−}, [NiF_{4}]^{2−}, [NiF_{6}]^{4−}, [NiCl_{2}(H_{2}O)_{4}] [Ni(NH_{3})_{4}(H_{2}O)_{2}]^{2+}, [Ni(NH_{3})_{6}]^{2+}, [Ni(en)_{3})]^{2+}. Some complexes have fivefold coordination. $\ce{N[CH2CH2NMe2]3}$ (tris(N,N-dimethyl-2-aminoethyl)amine); P(o-C_{6}H_{4}SMe)_{3}; P(CH_{2}CH_{2}CH_{2}AsMe_{2})_{3}.

Other ligands for octahedral coordination include PPh_{3}, PPh_{2}Me and thiourea.

Nickel tetrahedral complexes are often bright blue and 20 times or more intensely coloured than the octahedral complexes. The ligands can include selections of neutral amines, arsines, arsine oxides, phosphines or phosphine oxides and halogens.

Several nickel atoms can cluster together in a compound with other elements to produce nickel cluster complexes. One example where nickel atoms form a square pyramid is a nickel hydride cluster complexed by triphenyl phosphine ligands and bonding a hydrogen atom on each edge. Another example has a square planar Ni_{4}H_{4} shape in its core.

Nickel bis(dimethylglyoximate), an insoluble red solid is important for gravimetric analysis.

== Biological molecules ==
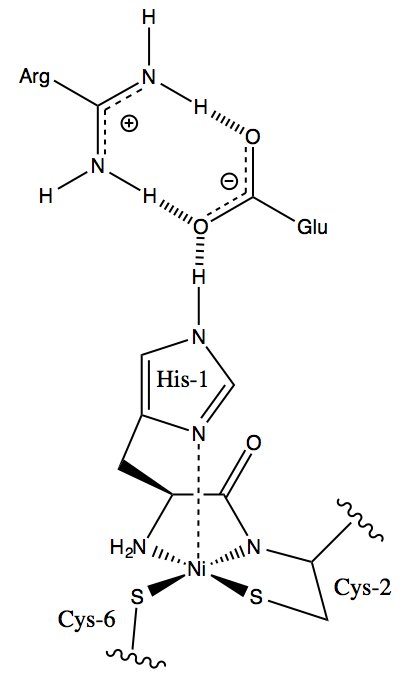
Active site of Nickel superoxide dismutase

Cofactor F430 contains nickel in a tetrapyrrole derivative, and is used in the production of methane. Some hydrogenase enzymes contain a nickel-iron cluster as an active site in which the nickel atom is held in place by cysteine or selenocysteine. Plant ureases contain a bis-μ-hydroxo dimeric nickel cluster. CO-methylating acetyl-CoA synthase contains two active nickel atoms, one is held in a square planar coordination by two cysteine and two amide groups, and the other nickel is held by three sulfur atoms. It is used to catalyse the reduction of carbon monoxide to acetyl-CoA.

Nickel superoxide dismutase (or Ni-SOD) from Streptomyces contains six nickel atoms. The nickel holding is done by a "nickel binding hook" which as the amino acid pattern H_{2}N-His-Cys-X-X-Pro-Cys-Gly-X-Tyr-rest of protein, where the bold bits are ligands for the nickel atom.

Nickel transporter proteins exist to move nickel atoms in the cell. in E. coli these are termed NikA, NikB, NikC, NikD, NikE. In order to come through a cell membrane a nickel permease protein is used. In Alcaligenes eutrophus the gene for this is hoxN.

== Organometallics ==
Well known nickel organometalic (or organonickel) compounds include Nickelocene, bis(cyclooctadiene)nickel(0) and nickel tetracarbonyl.

Nickel tetracarbonyl was the first discovered organonickel compound. It was discovered that carbon monoxide corroded a nickel reaction chamber valve. And then that the gas coloured a bunsen burner flame green, and then that a nickel mirror condensed from heating the gas. The Mond process was thus inspired to purify nickel. The nickel tetracarbonyl molecule is tetrahedral, with a bond length for nickel to carbon of 1.82 Å. Nickel tetracarbonyl easily starts breaking apart over 36° forming Ni(CO)_{3}, Ni(CO)_{2}, and Ni. Ni(CO) and NiC appear in mass spectroscopy of nickel carbonyl.

There are several nickel carbonyl cluster anions formed by reduction from nickel carbonyl. These are [Ni_{2}(CO)_{5}]^{2−}, dark red [Ni_{3}(CO)_{8}]^{2−}, [Ni_{4}(CO)_{9}]^{2−}, [Ni_{5}(CO)_{9}]^{2−}, [Ni_{6}(CO)_{12}]^{2−}. Salts such as Cd[Ni_{4}(CO)_{9}] and Li_{2}[Ni_{3}(CO)_{8}]•5acetone can be crystallised.

Mixed cluster carbonyl anions like [Cr_{2}Ni_{3}(CO)_{16}]^{2−}, [Mo_{2}Ni_{3}(CO)_{16}]^{2−} and [W_{2}Ni_{3}(CO)_{16}]^{2−} [Mo<Ni_{4}(CO)_{14}]^{2−} can form salts with bulky cations like tetraethylammonium. The brown [NiCo_{3}(CO)_{11}]^{−} changes to red [Ni_{2}Co_{4}(CO)_{14}]^{2−}.

With oxygen or air the explosive Ni(CO)_{3}O_{2} can be formed from nickel carbonyl.

Yet other ligands can substitute for carbon monoxide in nickel carbonyl. These lewis base ligands include triphenylphosphine, triphenoxyphosphine, trimethoxyphosphine, tributylphosphine, triethoxyphosphine, triethylisonitrolphosphine, triphenylarsine, and triphenylstibine.

Nickel forms dark blue planar complexes with 1,2-Diimino-3,5-cyclohexadiene or bisacetylbisaniline [(C_{6}H_{5}N-C(CH_{3})=)_{2}]_{2}Ni. Another planar bis compound of nickel is formed with phenylazothioformamide C_{6}H_{5}N=NC(S)NR_{2}, and dithizone C_{6}H_{5}N=NC(S)NHNHC_{6}H_{5}. tetrasulfur tetranitride when reduced with nickel carbonyl makes Ni[N_{2}S_{2}H]_{2} also coloured dark violet.

One nickellabenzene is known where nickel substitutes for carbon in benzene. At nickel the plane of the molecule is bent, however the connection to the ring has aromatic character. A hexavalent nickel complex, Ni(BeCp)_{6}, has been synthesized, and aromaticity has also been calculated to contribute to its stability.

=== Alkoxy compounds ===
Nickel tert-butoxide Ni[OC(CH_{3})_{3}]_{2} is coloured violet. It is formed in the reaction of di-tert-butylperoxide with nickel carbonyl.

Nickel dimethoxide is coloured green. There are also nickel chloride methoxides with formulae: NiClOMe, Ni_{3}Cl_{2}(OMe)_{4} and Ni_{3}Cl(OMe)_{5} in which Nickel and oxygen appear to form a cubane-type cluster.

Other alkoxy compounds known for nickel include nickel dipropoxide, nickel di-isopropoxide, nickel tert-amyloxide, and nickel di-tert-hexanoxide. These can be formed by crystallising nickel chloride from the corresponding alcohol, which forms an adduct. This is then heated with a base. Nickel(II) alkoxy compounds are polymeric and non-volatile.

Ziegler catalysis uses nickel as a catalyst. In addition it uses diethylaluminum ethoxide, phenylacetylene and triethylaluminium It converts ethylene into 1-butene. It can dimerise propylene. The catalyst, when combined with optically active phosphines, can produce optically active dimers. An intermediate formed is tris(ethylene)nickel.(CH_{2}=CH_{2})_{3}Ni in which the ethylene molecules connect to the nickel atom side on.

Homoletptic bimetallic alkoxides have two different metals, and the same alkoxy group. They include Ni[(μ−OMe)_{3}AlOMe]_{2}, Ni[Al(OBu^{t})_{4}]_{2} (nickel tetra-tert-butoxyaluminate) and Ni[Al(OPr^{i})_{4}]_{2}. (nickel tetra-isopropoxyaluminate a pink liquid) Potassium hexaisoproxynoibate and tantalate can react with nickel chloride to make Ni[Nb(OPr^{i})_{6}]_{2} and Ni[Ta(OPr^{i})_{6}]_{2}. Ni[Zr_{2}(OPr^{i})_{9}]_{2} The bimetallic alkoxides are volatile and can dissolve in organic solvents. A trimetallic one exists [Zr_{2}(OPr^{i})_{9}]Ni[Al(OPr^{i})_{4}]. NiGe(OBu^{t})_{8}], NiSn(OBu^{t})_{8}] and NiPb(OBu^{t})_{8}] are tricyclic. [Ni_{2}(μ3−OEt)_{2}(μ−OEt)_{8}Sb_{4}(OEt)_{6}]

Heteroleptic bitmetallic ethoxides have more than one variety of alkoxy group, e.g. Ni[(μ−OPr^{i})(μ−OBu^{t})Al(OBu^{t})_{2}]_{2} which is a purple solid.

Oxoalkoxides contain extra oxygen in addition to the alcohol. With only nickel, none are known, but with antimony an octanuclear molecule exists [Ni_{5}Sb_{3}(μ4−O)_{2}(μ3−OEt)_{3}(−OEt)_{9}(OEt)_{3}(EtOH)_{4}].

=== Aryloxy compounds ===
There are many nickel compounds with the formula template Ni(OAr)XL_{2} and Ni(OAr)_{2}L_{2}. L is a ligand with phosphorus or nitrogen atoms. OAr is a phenol group or O- attached to an aromatic ring. Often an extra molecule of the phenol is hydrogen bonded to the oxygen attached to nickel.

=== μ-bonded molecules ===
Others include cyclododecatriene nickel and t-Ni(cdt).

=== Sulfur rings ===
Nickel bis-dithiobenzoate can form a violet coloured sodium salt.

Two bisperfluoromethyl-l,2-dithietene molecules react with nickel carbonyl to make a double ring compound with nickel linked to four sulfur atoms. This contains four trifluoromethyl groups and is dark purple. Instead of this methyl or phenyl can substitute. These can be made by substituted acetylenes with sulfur on nickel carbonyl, or on nickel sulfide. Bis-diphenyldithiene nickel has a planar structure

=== Nickel chalcogen cluster compound ===
A hexameric compound [Ni(SR)_{2}]_{6} is produced in the reaction of nickel carbonyl with dialkyl sulfides (RSR).

Nickel can be part of a cubane-type cluster with iron and chalcogens. The metal atoms are arranged in a tetrahedron shape, with the sulfur or selenium making up another tetrahedron that combines to make a cube. For example, the [NiFe_{3}S_{4}(PPh_{3})(SEt)_{3}]^{2−} is a dianion that has a tetraethyl ammonium salt. Similar ion clusters are [NiFe_{3}Se_{4}(PPh_{3})(SEt)_{3}]^{2−} and [NiFe_{3}Se_{4}(SEt)_{4}]^{3−}. In the natural world cube shaped metal sulfur clusters can have sulfur atoms that are part of cysteine.

[Ni_{4}Se_{23}]^{4−} has a cube with Ni^{IV}_{4}Se_{4} at its core, and then the nickel atoms are bridge across the cube faces by five Se_{3} chains and one Se^{4} chain. It is formed as a tetraethylammonium salt, from Li_{2}Se, Se, NEt_{4}Cl and nickel dixanthate in dimethylformamide as a solvent. This reaction also produces (NEt_{4})_{2}Ni(Se_{4})_{2}.

=== Nitrosyl compounds ===
When liquid nickel carbonyl is dissolved in liquid hydrogen chloride, it can react with nitrosyl chloride to form a dimer Ni(NOCl)_{2}. This then decomposes to Ni(NO)Cl_{2}, which is polymeric.

Nickel carbonyl reacting with nitric oxide yields blue coloured mononitrosyl nickel NiNO. With cyclohexane as well, pale blue Ni(NO_{2})NO is produced with nitrous oxide as a side product. With cyclopentadiene as well, π-C_{5}H_{5}NiNO is produced.

== See also ==
- Category:Nickel compounds
- Nickel(IV) organometallic complex

== Sources ==
- Mellor, J. W. (May 1936). "Nickel". A Comprehensive Treatise on Inorganic and Theoretical Chemistry Volume XV Ni Ru, Rh Pd, Os, Ir. Archived from the original on 2017-02-07. (pages accessible by changing number on url)
- Nichols, David (1975). The chemistry of iron, cobalt and nickel. Oxford: Pergamon Press. ISBN 0080188737.
