= Nickel(II) oxide =

Chemical compound

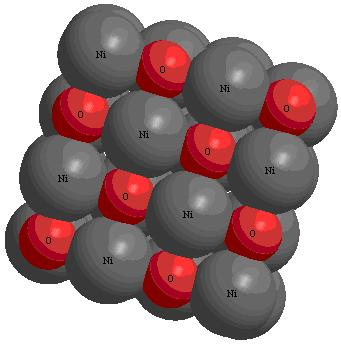
- Nickel(II) oxide

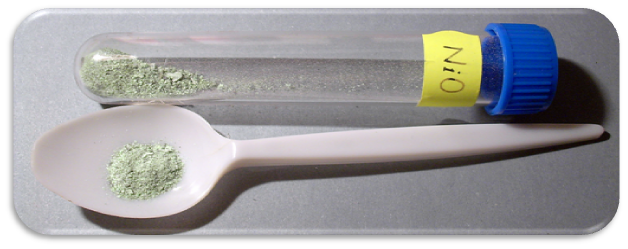
- Nickel(II) oxide

Names
- IUPAC name Nickel(II) oxide
- Other names Nickel monoxide Oxonickel

Identifiers
CAS Number	1313-99-1
3D model (JSmol)	Interactive image
ChemSpider	156595
ECHA InfoCard	100.013.833
EC Number	215-215-7
PubChem CID	14805
RTECS number	QR8400000
UNII	C3574QBZ3Y
UN number	3288 3077
CompTox Dashboard (EPA)	DTXSID001033642 DTXSID7025710, DTXSID001033642
- InChI: InChI=1S/Ni.O/q+2;-2 Key: KVAWBJDCAFOHRG-UHFFFAOYSA-N
- SMILES: [O-2].[Ni+2]

Properties
Chemical formula	NiO
Molar mass	74.6928 g/mol
Appearance	green crystalline solid
Density	6.67 g/cm^{3}
Melting point	1,955 °C (3,551 °F; 2,228 K)
Solubility in water	negligible
Solubility	dissolves in KCN
Magnetic susceptibility (χ)	+660.0·10^{−6} cm^{3}/mol
Refractive index (n_{D})	2.1818

Thermochemistry
Std enthalpy of formation (Δ_{f}H^{⦵}_{298})	−240.0 kJ/mol

Hazards
- GHS labelling
Pictograms	(GHS07: Exclamation mark) (GHS08: Health hazard) (GHS09: Environmental hazard)
Signal word	Danger
Hazard statements	H317, H350, H372, H413
Precautionary statements	P201, P202, P260, P264, P270, P272, P273, P280, P281, P285, P302+P352, P304+P341, P308+P313, P314, P321, P333+P313, P342+P311, P363, P391, P405, P501
NFPA 704 (fire diamond)	2 0 0
Flash point	Non-flammable
- Lethal dose or concentration (LD, LC)
LD_{Lo} (lowest published)	5000 mg/kg (rat, oral)
Safety data sheet (SDS)	JT Baker

Related compounds
Other anions	Nickel(II) sulfide Nickel(II) selenide Nickel(II) telluride
Other cations	Palladium(II) oxide
- Except where otherwise noted, data are given for materials in their standard state (at 25 °C [77 °F], 100 kPa). verify (what is ?) Infobox references

Nickel(II) oxide is the chemical compound with the formula NiO. It is the principal oxide of nickel. It is classified as a basic metal oxide. Several million kilograms are produced annually of varying quality, mainly as an intermediate in the production of nickel alloys. The mineralogical form of NiO, bunsenite, is very rare. Other nickel oxides include Ni_{2}O_{3} and NiO_{2}.

== Production ==
NiO can be prepared by multiple methods. Upon heating above 400 °C, nickel powder reacts with oxygen to give NiO. In some commercial processes, green nickel oxide is made by heating a mixture of nickel powder and water at 1000 °C; the rate for this reaction can be increased by the addition of NiO. The simplest and most successful method of preparation is through pyrolysis of nickel(II) compounds such as the hydroxide, nitrate, and carbonate, which yield a light green powder. Synthesis from the elements by heating the metal in oxygen can yield grey to black powders which indicates nonstoichiometry.

== Structure ==
NiO adopts the NaCl structure, with octahedral Ni^{2+} and O^{2−} sites. The conceptually simple structure is commonly known as the rock salt structure. Like many other binary metal oxides, NiO is often non-stoichiometric, meaning that the Ni:O ratio deviates from 1:1. In nickel oxide, this non-stoichiometry is accompanied by a color change, with the stoichiometrically correct NiO being green and the non-stoichiometric NiO being black.

== Applications and reactions ==
NiO has a variety of specialized applications and generally, applications distinguish between "chemical grade", which is relatively pure material for specialty applications, and "metallurgical grade", which is mainly used for the production of alloys. It is used in the ceramic industry to make frits, ferrites, and porcelain glazes. The sintered oxide is used to produce nickel steel alloys. Charles Édouard Guillaume won the 1920 Nobel Prize in Physics for his work on nickel steel alloys which he called invar and elinvar.

NiO is a commonly used hole transport material in thin film solar cells. It was also a component in the nickel-iron battery, also known as the Edison Battery, and is a component in fuel cells. It is the precursor to many nickel salts, for use as specialty chemicals and catalysts. More recently, NiO was used to make the NiCd rechargeable batteries found in many electronic devices until the development of the environmentally superior NiMH battery. NiO an anodic electrochromic material, have been widely studied as counter electrodes with tungsten oxide, cathodic electrochromic material, in complementary electrochromic devices.

About 4000 tons of chemical grade NiO are produced annually. Black NiO is the precursor to nickel salts, which arise by treatment with mineral acids. NiO is a versatile hydrogenation catalyst.

Heating nickel oxide with either hydrogen, carbon, or carbon monoxide reduces it to metallic nickel. It combines with the oxides of sodium and potassium at high temperatures (>700 °C) to form the corresponding nickelate.

== Magnetism ==
NiO is a prototypical antiferromagnet, with the magnetic moments of Ni atoms aligning antiparallel to one another below the material's Néel temperature, determined to be approximately 523 K. The magnetic structure is of ferromagnetic sheets of Ni atoms parallel to the crystal's (111) planes, and the direction of magnetisation between adjacent planes is antiparallel, with the magnetic moment of each Ni atom determined to be approximately 1.9 Bohr magnetons.

== Electronic structure ==
NiO is often cited as a good example for illustrating the failure of conventional band theoretic approaches—including density functional theory (DFT, using functionals based on the local-density approximation) and Hartree–Fock theory—to account for the strong correlations associated with the localised $3d$ states of Ni in the material. The term "strong correlation" refers to behaviour of electrons in solids that is not well described (often not even in a qualitatively correct manner) by simple one-electron theories such as the local-density approximation (LDA) or Hartree–Fock theory. For instance, the seemingly simple material NiO has a partially filled 3d-band (the Ni atom has 8 of 10 possible 3d-electrons) and therefore would be expected to be a good conductor. However, strong Coulomb repulsion (a correlation effect) between $d$-electrons makes NiO instead a wide band gap Mott insulator. Thus, NiO has an electronic structure that is neither simply free-electron-like nor completely ionic, but a mixture of both.

However, more sophisticated calculations of the material's electronic structure are able to recover results which agree well with the experimental data. For example, self-interaction corrected density functional theory, the DFT+ Hubbard U method, the GW approximation, DFT + dynamical mean-field theory (DMFT), and hybrid exchange-correlation functionals, have all been shown to accurately reproduce the band gap of NiO.

== Health risks ==
Long-term inhalation of NiO is damaging to the lungs, causing lesions and in some cases cancer.

The calculated half-life of dissolution of NiO in the blood is more than 90 days. NiO has a long retention half-time in the lungs; after administration to rodents, it persisted in the lungs for more than 3 months. Nickel oxide is classified as a human carcinogen based on increased respiratory cancer risks observed in epidemiological studies of sulfidic ore refinery workers.

In a 2-year National Toxicology Program green NiO inhalation study, some evidence of carcinogenicity in F344/N rats but equivocal evidence in female B6C3F1 mice was observed; there was no evidence of carcinogenicity in male B6C3F1 mice. Chronic inflammation without fibrosis was observed in the 2-year studies.
