= Black nickel =

Black nickel is various black substances containing nickel:

- Nickel_electroplating#Black_nickel, a dark coating applied by plating;
- Electroless nickel-phosphorus plating with a black surface finish (black electroless nickel)
- Nickel oxide hydroxide, NiO(OH), a black solid used in various battery chemistries;
- Nickel(III) oxide, Ni_{2}O_{3}, also known as black nickel oxide, an unstable and rare compound.

== See also ==
- Bluing (steel), a blue-black conversion coating on iron
- Black chrome, a durable chromium plating sometimes called "black nickel" that resembles black nickel, but is much harder
- Phosphate conversion coating, a matte grey/black conversion finish
