= Nickel oxide =

Class of chemical compounds

Nickel oxide may refer to:

- Nickel(II) oxide, NiO, green, well-characterised oxide
- Nickel(III) oxide, Ni_{2}O_{3}, black, not well-characterised oxide
- Nickel(IV) oxide
- Oxonickelates
- Nickel oxide hydroxide
