= Nickel(III) fluoride =

Names
- IUPAC name Nickel(III) fluoride

Identifiers
CAS Number	18642-20-1
3D model (JSmol)	Interactive image
ChemSpider	7969503
PubChem CID	15243547
CompTox Dashboard (EPA)	DTXSID101336960
- InChI: InChI=1S/3FH.Ni/h3*1H;/q;;;+3/p-3 Key: BNVPLKJYDKYBMC-UHFFFAOYSA-K
- SMILES: F[Ni](F)F

Properties
Chemical formula	NiF_{3}
Molar mass	115.689 g/mol

Related compounds
Other anions	Nickel(III) oxide Nickel oxide hydroxide
Other cations	Titanium(III) fluoride Vanadium(III) fluoride Chromium(III) fluoride Manganese(III) fluoride Iron(III) fluoride Cobalt(III) fluoride
- Except where otherwise noted, data are given for materials in their standard state (at 25 °C [77 °F], 100 kPa). Infobox references

Nickel(III) fluoride is the chemical compound with the formula NiF_{3}. It is an ionic compound of nickel and fluorine.

== Preparation ==
Nickel(III) fluoride can be prepared by the reaction of potassium hexafluoronickelate(IV) with arsenic pentafluoride in hydrofluoric acid.
