= Nickel battery =

Nickel battery may refer to:

- Nickel–cadmium battery, a type of rechargeable battery using nickel oxide hydroxide and metallic cadmium as electrodes
- Nickel–iron battery, a type of rechargeable battery using nickel(III) oxide-hydroxide positive plates and iron negative plates, with an electrolyte of potassium hydroxide
- Nickel–metal hydride battery, a type of rechargeable battery with the negative electrodes use a hydrogen-absorbing alloy instead of cadmium
- Lithium coin cell batteries, sometimes called nickel batteries despite not containing nickel
