= Neodymium nickelate =

Names
- Other names Neodymium(III) nickelate

Identifiers
CAS Number	11132-41-5
3D model (JSmol)	Interactive image
PubChem CID	167713707
- InChI: InChI=1S/Nd.Ni.3O/q2*+3;3*-2 Key: QDQFJKLUAHCIBS-UHFFFAOYSA-N
- SMILES: [Nd+3].[Ni+3].[O-2].[O-2].[O-2]

Properties
Chemical formula	NdNiO_{3}
Molar mass	250.932 g·mol^{−1}

Hazards
- GHS labelling
Pictograms	(GHS07: Exclamation mark) (GHS08: Health hazard)
Signal word	Danger
Hazard statements	H317, H350, H372
Precautionary statements	P261, P263, P280, P405, P501

Related compounds
Other anions	Neodymium(III) oxide Neodymium(III) acetate Neodymium(III) hydride
Other cations	europium nickelate lanthanum nickelate
- Except where otherwise noted, data are given for materials in their standard state (at 25 °C [77 °F], 100 kPa). Infobox references

Neodymium nickelate is a nickelate of neodymium with a chemical formula NdNiO_{3}. In this compound, the neodymium atom is in the +3 oxidation state.

== Preparation ==
Neodymium nickelate can be prepared by dissolving neodymium(III) oxide and nickel(II) oxide in nitric acid, followed by heating the mixture in an oxygen atmosphere.

It can also be prepared by pyrolyzing a mixture of nickel nitrate and neodymium nitrate.

It decomposes in high temperature (950 °C) by nitrogen:

4 NdNiO_{3} → 2 Nd_{2}NiO_{4} + 2 NiO + O_{2}

It can also be reduced to the monovalent nickel compound NdNiO_{2} by sodium hydride at 160 °C.

== Physical properties ==
Neodymium nickelate shows metal-insulator transition (MIT) under low temperature. The temperature at which it transforms (T_{MIT}) is 200K, which is higher than praseodymium nickelate (130K) but lower than samarium nickelate (400K). It transforms from antiferromagnetism to paramagnetism. It has demonstrated to be a first-order phase transition (this applies for praseodymium nickelate as well). The temperature (T_{N}) can be changed by varying the NiO_{6} octahedral distortion. It is the only lathanide nickelate to have the same T_{MIT} as T_{N}.

== Uses ==
In a 2010 study, it was found that neodymium nickelate as an anode material provided 1.7 times the current density of typical LSM anodes when integrated into a commercial SOEC and operated at 700 °C, and approximately 4 times the current density when operated at 800 °C. The increased performance is postulated to be due to higher "overstoichiometry" of oxygen in the neodymium nickelate, making it a successful conductor of both ions and electrons.

Neodymium nickelate can also be used in electrocatalysts, synapse transistors, photovoltaics, memory resistors, biosensors, and electric-field sensors.
