= Nickel ternary chalcogenides =

Class of chemical compounds

The nickel ternary chalcogenides are a class of chemical compounds that contain nickel, one other metallic element, and a chalcogenide. Nickel combined with another metal and oxygen forms a series of double nickel oxides which are referred to as "nickelates" or, more precisely, "oxonickelates". This page lists the many other well-defined double compounds of nickel with sulfur, selenium and tellurium; double nickel oxides are listed elsewhere.

formula	name	colour	structure	production	references
NH_{4}NiS_{5}	ammonium nickel sulphide	black		NH_{4} polysulfide+NiSO_{4}	
K_{2}Ni_{3}S_{4}	potassium nickel tetrasulfide	bronze yellow	Fddd a=10.023 b=26.074 c=5.704	NiSO_{4} K_{2}CO_{3} S	
K_{2}Ni_{11}S_{10}	potassium nickel decasulfide	dark metallic green		NiO+KCNS	J. Milbauer
Na_{2}Ni_{3}S_{4}	sodium nickel tetrasulfide	dark yellow		NiSO_{4} Na_{2}CO_{3} S	R. Schneider
KNi_{2}S_{2}	potassium dinickel disulfide	orange yellow		Ni foil, S, K at 723K	
K_{2}Ni_{3}Se_{4}	potassium nickel tetraselenide	gold	Fddd a=10.468 b=26.496 c=5.995		
KNi_{2}Se_{2}	potassium dinickel diselenide	purple-red	I4/mmmtetragonal a=3.909, c=13.4142	Ni foil, Se shot, K at 723K	
CsNi_{2}Se_{2}	caesium dinickel diselenide		tetragonal a=3.988, c=14.419	heat elements	
TlNi_{2}Se_{2}	Thallium dinickel diselenide	gold metallic	tetragonal	heat elements together in closed quartz tube	
Rb_{2}Ni_{3}S_{4}	rubidium nickel tetrasulphide	metallic greenish gold	Fmmm orthorhombic a=9.901 Å, b=13.606 Å and c=5.861 Z=4 layered; ferromagnetic only after water immersion		
Rb_{2}Ni_{3}Se_{4}	rubidium nickel tetraselenide	golden metallic	Fddd orthorhombic a = 10.555 Å, b = 27.588 Å, c = 6.031 Å, Z = 8 layered; ferromagnetic only after water immersion	Rb_{2}CO_{3} S Ni	
Cs_{2}Ni_{3}S_{4}	cesium nickel tetrasulphide	greenish gold	Fmmm a=10.038 b=14.552 c=5.934		
Cs_{2}Ni_{3}S_{4}	cesium nickel tetrasulphide	gold	Fmmm a=10.540 b=14.624 c=6.194		
Cs_{0.9}Ni_{3.1}Se_{3}			Hexagonal P6_{3}/m a = 9.26301(4) Å and c = 4.34272(2) Å	quasi-one-dimensional electric conductor	
BaNi_{4}S_{5}	Barium nickel pentasulfide	bronze yellow		NiSO_{4} K_{2}CO_{3} S	R. Schneider; I. and L. Bellucci
Pb_{2}Ni_{3}S_{2}	lead nickel disulfide	melt 790°		PbS Ni	W Guertler; W Guertler H Schack
(Ni,Fe)_{9}S_{8}	Pentlandite	bronze yellow melt 870			T. Scheerer
Fe_{2}Ni_{2}S_{4}	ferrous nickel tetrasulfide	melt 840			K Bornemann
Fe_{2}Ni_{2}S_{3}	ferrous nickel trisulfide	stable over 575°, melt 886,			K Bornemann
Fe_{3}Ni_{4}S_{5}	ferrous nickel pentasulfide			below 575	K Bornemann
Fe_{4}Ni_{2}S_{5}					K Bornemann
Fe_{2}Ni_{3}S_{4}					K Bornemann
Fe_{3}Ni_{4}S_{5}					K Bornemann
Fe_{2}Ni_{2}S_{3}					K Bornemann
FeNi_{2}S_{4}	Violarite	dark violet grey		mineral oxidate	
Ni_{3}Sn_{2}S_{2}					
Ni_{3}Bi_{2}S_{2}				superconducting	
Ni_{3}Bi_{2}Se_{2}				superconducting	
NiSnS_{3}	nickel thiostannate	greenish black	orthorhombic a=6.88 b=7.89 c=11.95 Z=8 V=644	NiCl_{2} + SnS_{2}	
NiGeS3_{3}	nickelselenogermanate				
Ta_{2}NiS_{5}			Orthorhombic		
Ta_{2}NiSe_{5}			monoclinic β=90.53		
Ta_{2}Ni_{2}Te_{4}					
Ta_{2}Ni_{3}Te_{5}					
