= Nickel(II) hydroxide =

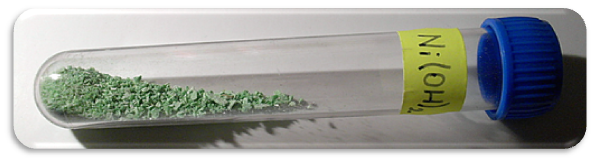
- Nickel(II) hydroxide

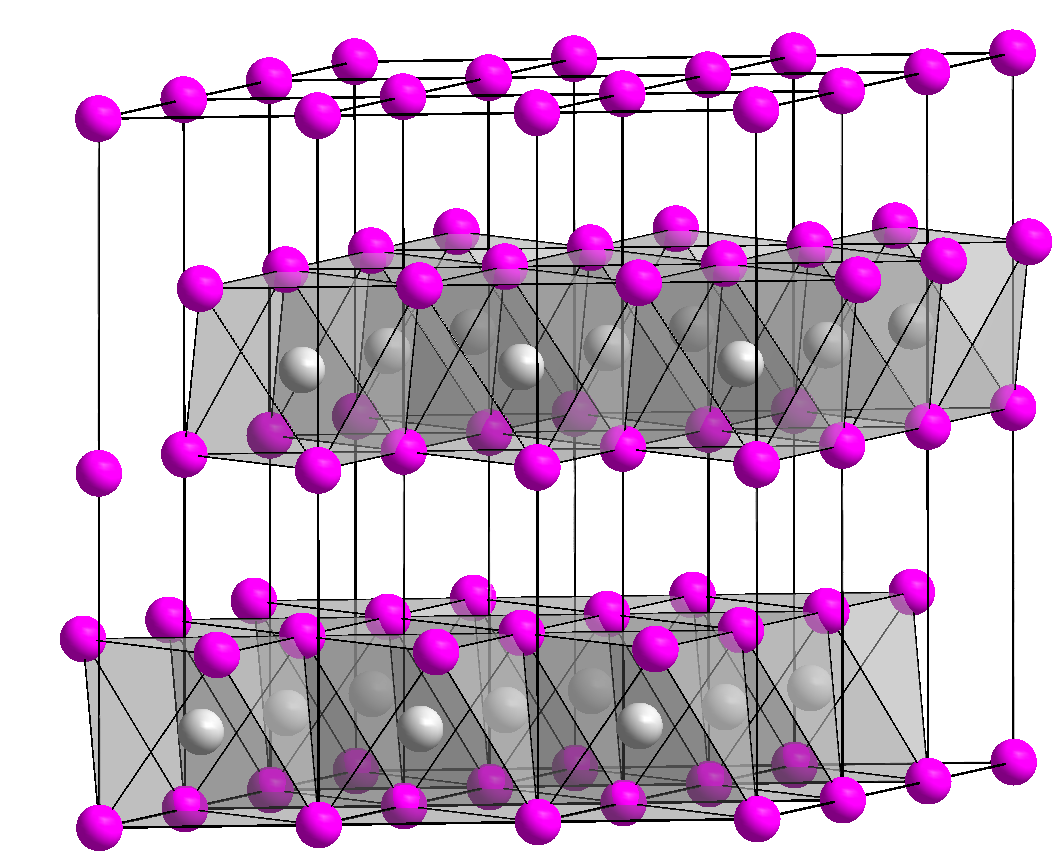
- Nickel(II) hydroxide

Names
- IUPAC name Nickel(II) hydroxide
- Other names Nickel hydroxide, Theophrastite

Identifiers
CAS Number	12054-48-7; 36897-37-7 (monohydrate)
3D model (JSmol)	Interactive image
ChemSpider	55452
ECHA InfoCard	100.031.813
EC Number	235-008-5
PubChem CID	61534
RTECS number	QR648000
UNII	L8UW92NW6J
CompTox Dashboard (EPA)	DTXSID90274011
- InChI: InChI=1S/Ni.2H2O/h;2*1H2/q+2;;/p-2 Key: BFDHFSHZJLFAMC-UHFFFAOYSA-L; InChI=1/Ni.2H2O/h;2*1H2/q+2;;/p-2 Key: BFDHFSHZJLFAMC-NUQVWONBAJ
- SMILES: [Ni+2].[OH-].[OH-]

Properties
Chemical formula	Ni(OH)_{2}
Molar mass	92.724 g/mol (anhydrous); 110.72 g/mol (monohydrate)
Appearance	green crystals
Density	4.10 g/cm^{3}
Melting point	230 °C (446 °F; 503 K) (anhydrous, decomposes)
Solubility in water	0.0015 g/L
Solubility product (K_{sp})	5.48×10^{−16}
Magnetic susceptibility (χ)	+4500.0·10^{−6} cm^{3}/mol

Structure
Crystal structure	hexagonal, hP3
Space group	P3̅m1, No. 164
Lattice constant	a = 0.3117 nm, b = 0.3117 nm, c = 0.4595 nm α = 90°, β = 90°, γ = 120°

Thermochemistry
Std molar entropy (S^{⦵}_{298})	79 J·mol^{−1}·K^{−1}
Std enthalpy of formation (Δ_{f}H^{⦵}_{298})	−538 kJ·mol^{−1}

Hazards
- GHS labelling
Pictograms	(GHS07: Exclamation mark) (GHS08: Health hazard)
Signal word	Danger
Hazard statements	H302, H315, H317, H332, H334, H341, H350, H360, H372
Precautionary statements	P201, P260, P280, P284, P405, P501
- Lethal dose or concentration (LD, LC)
LD_{50} (median dose)	1515 mg/kg (oral, rat)
Safety data sheet (SDS)	External SDS
- Except where otherwise noted, data are given for materials in their standard state (at 25 °C [77 °F], 100 kPa). verify (what is ?) Infobox references

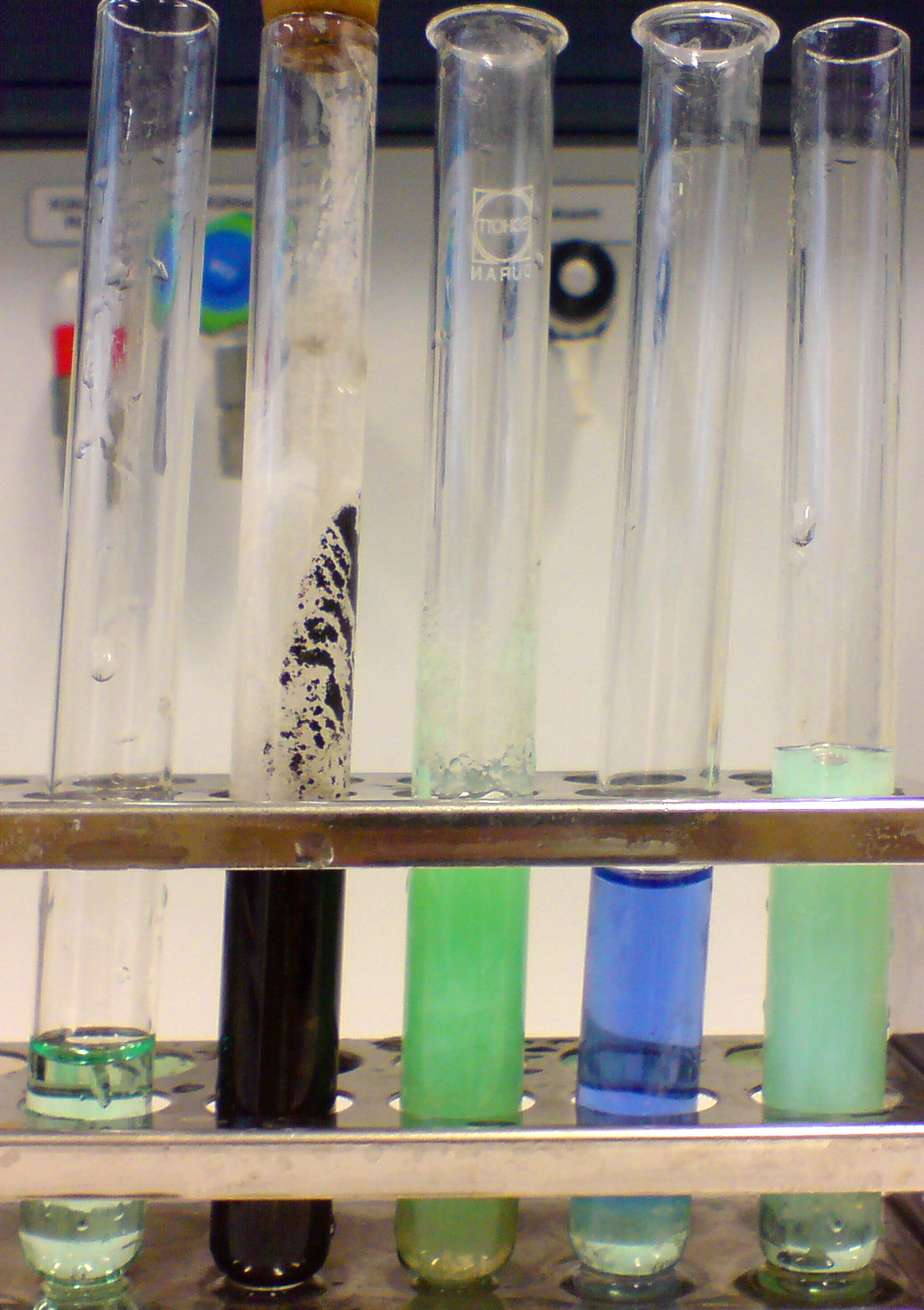
The test tube in the middle contains a precipitate of nickel(II) hydroxide

Nickel(II) hydroxide is the inorganic compound with the formula Ni(OH)_{2}. It is a lime-green solid that dissolves with decomposition in ammonia and amines and is attacked by acids. It is electroactive, being converted to the Ni(III) oxy-hydroxide, leading to widespread applications in rechargeable batteries.

== Properties ==
Nickel(II) hydroxide has two well-characterized polymorphs, α and β. The α structure consists of Ni(OH)_{2} layers with intercalated anions or water. The β form adopts a hexagonal close-packed structure of Ni^{2+} and OH^{−} ions. In the presence of water, the α polymorph typically recrystallizes to the β form. In addition to the α and β polymorphs, several γ nickel hydroxides have been described, distinguished by crystal structures with much larger inter-sheet distances.

== Occurrence ==
The mineral form of Ni(OH)_{2}, theophrastite, was first identified in the Vermion region of northern Greece, in 1980. It is found naturally as a translucent emerald-green crystal formed in thin sheets near the boundaries of idocrase or chlorite crystals. A nickel-magnesium variant of the mineral, (Ni,Mg)(OH)_{2} had been previously discovered at Hagdale on the island of Unst in Scotland.

== Reactions ==
Nickel(II) hydroxide is frequently used in electrical car batteries. Specifically, Ni(OH)_{2} readily oxidizes to nickel oxyhydroxide, NiOOH, in combination with a reduction reaction, often of a metal hydride (reaction 1 and 2).

Reaction 1 Ni(OH)_{2} + OH^{−} → NiO(OH) + H_{2}O + e^{−}

Reaction 2 M + H_{2}O + e^{−} → MH + OH^{−}

Net Reaction (in H_{2}O) Ni(OH)_{2} + M → NiOOH + MH

Of the two polymorphs, α-Ni(OH)_{2} has a higher theoretical capacity and thus is generally considered to be preferable in electrochemical applications. However, it transforms to β-Ni(OH)_{2} in alkaline solutions, leading to many investigations into the possibility of stabilized α-Ni(OH)_{2} electrodes for industrial applications.

== Synthesis ==
The synthesis entails treating aqueous solutions of nickel(II) salts with potassium hydroxide. When the same reaction is conducted in the presence of bromine, the product is Ni_{3}O_{2}(OH)_{4}.

== Toxicity ==
The Ni^{2+} ion is a carcinogen when inhaled.

== See also ==
- List of minerals named after people
- Nickel–cadmium battery
- Nickel–hydrogen battery
- Nickel–metal hydride battery
- Nickel–iron battery
