= Trans,trans,trans-(1,5,9-Cyclododecatriene)nickel(0) =

trans,trans,trans-(1,5,9-Cyclododecatriene)nickel(0)
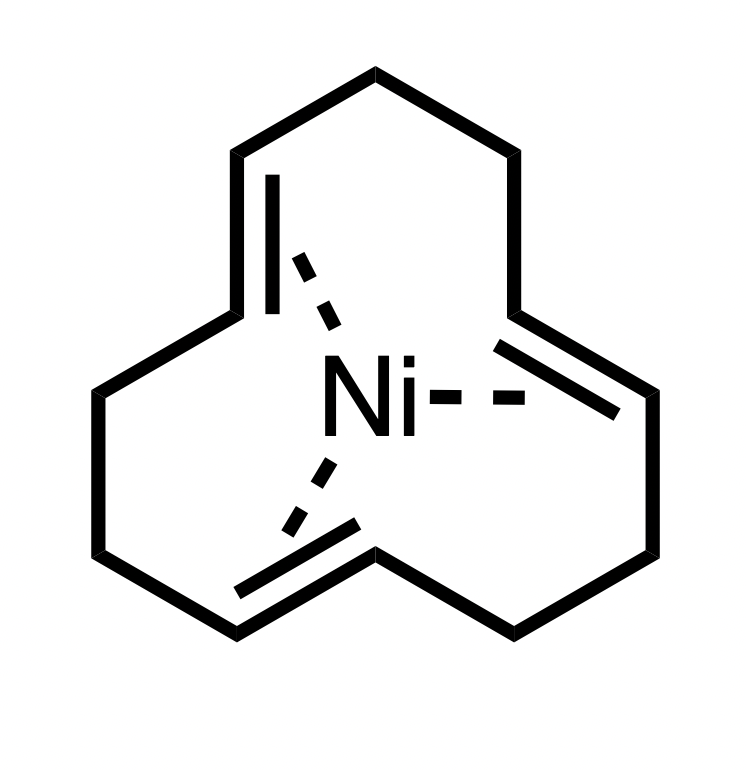

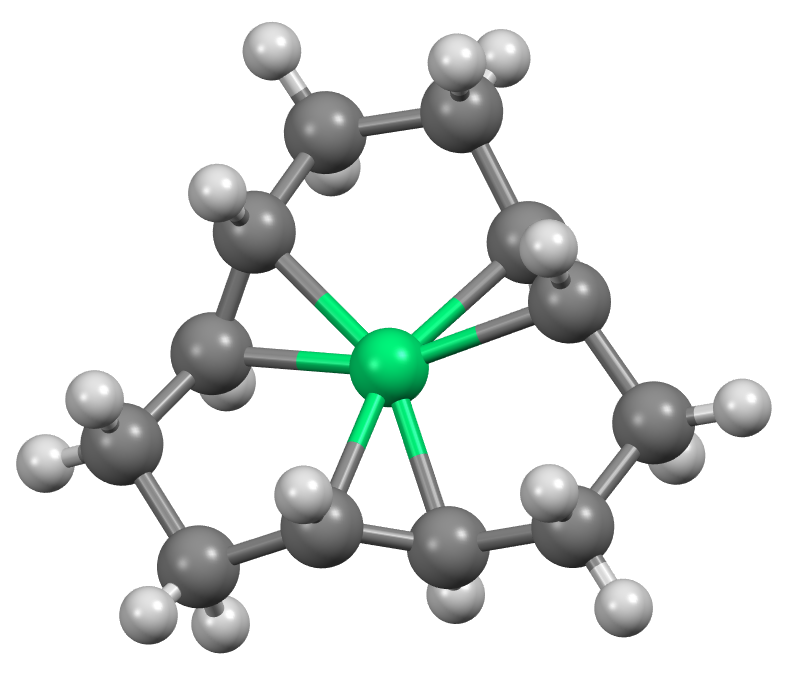

Names
- IUPAC name (1E,5E,9E)-cyclododeca-1,5,9-triene;nickel
- Other names all-trans-(1,5,9-Cyclododecatriene)nickel(0), Ni(ttt-cdt)

Identifiers
CAS Number	12126-69-1
3D model (JSmol)	Interactive image
ChemSpider	9599439
PubChem CID	11424563
CompTox Dashboard (EPA)	DTXSID701336849
- InChI: InChI=1S/2C8H8.Ni/c2*1-2-4-6-8-7-5-3-1;/h2*1-2,7-8H2; Key: AYHVBQBQROAZHP-UHFFFAOYSA-N; InChI=1S/C12H18.Ni/c1-2-4-6-8-10-12-11-9-7-5-3-1;/h1-2,7-10H,3-6,11-12H2;/b2-1+,9-7+,10-8+; Key: RVXPUSSGELSUTI-CLDUCCMASA-N
- SMILES: C1/C=C/CC/C=C/CC/C=C/C1.[Ni]

Properties
Chemical formula	C_{12}H_{18}Ni
Molar mass	220.96 g/mol
Appearance	Red solid
Melting point	140 °C (284 °F; 413 K) (N_{2}, decomposes)
Solubility	soluble in diethyl ether
- Except where otherwise noted, data are given for materials in their standard state (at 25 °C [77 °F], 100 kPa). verify (what is ?) Infobox references

trans,trans,trans-(1,5,9-Cyclododecatriene)nickel(0) is the organonickel compound with the formula NiC_{12}H_{18}, better known as t-Ni(cdt). It is a 16-electron coordination complex featuring trigonal planar nickel(0) bound to the three alkene groups in the cyclododecatriene ligand. X-ray structural analysis demonstrates that the three olefins adopt a propeller-like arrangement around the nickel atom center, making the structure chiral. This extremely air-sensitive deep red solid was the first discovered Ni(0)-olefin complex.

== Preparation and properties ==
The complex is prepared by reduction of anhydrous nickel(II) acetylacetonate in ether in the presence of the triolefin:

Ni(acac)_{2} + t-cdt + 2 Et_{2}AlOEt → t-Ni(cdt) + 2 acacAlOEt + 2 C_{2}H_{5}•

σ-Donating ligands such as carbon monoxide, isonitriles, phosphines, and hydrides can readily add onto t-Ni(cdt) to furnish tetrahedral 18-electron nickel complexes. It has been demonstrated that this fourth coordination site can be leveraged to separate the t-Ni(cdt) enantiomers with recrystallization of diastereomeric 18-electron t-Ni(cdt)L* complexes (where L* = optically active dimethylmenthylphosphine ligand).

== Applications ==
The all-trans-(cdt) ligand has been shown to be easily displaced with olefins such as trans-cyclooctene, ethylene, all-cis-(cdt), norbornene, to give the corresponding colorless 16-electron Ni(0)-olefin complexes with coplanar geometry. Ni(cod)_{2} can also be easily prepared from Ni(cdt).

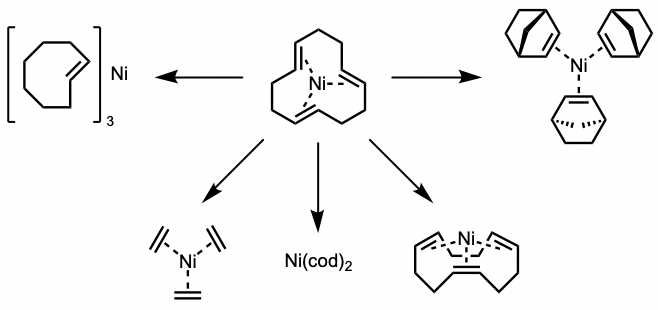
Formation of other 16-electron Ni(0)-olefin complexes from t-Ni(cdt)

Recently, it was demonstrated that t-Ni(cdt) can be used to synthesize unique air-stable 16-electron Ni(0)–olefin complexes, such as Ni(^{F}stb)_{3} and Ni(^{4-tBu}stb)_{3} using (E)-stilbene ligands.
