= Tetraiodonickelate(II) =

Inorganic dianion

Tetraiodonickelate(II) is a complex dianion of nickel with four iodide ions arranged in a tetrahedral structure. [NiI_{4}]^{2−} is red in solution. This colour is due to absorption around 530 nm and below 450 nm. Maximum light transmission is around 620 nm, which is red. A broad weak absorption in the near infrared is at 740 nm. The magnetic moment is anomalously low.

A mixture of lithium iodide and nickel iodide in water or methanol can partition [NiI_{4}]^{2−} ions into a cyclohexane-amine mixture. The solution formed is blood red.

== History ==
In 1909, Cambi had noticed that a mixture of nickel iodide and sodium iodide dissolved in acetone has a red colour. This red colour was due to the presence of tetraiodonickelate.

== Salts ==
Bis(triphenylmethylarsonium) tetraiodonickelate is red in colour and has the chemical formula [(C_{6}H_{5})_{3}CH_{3}As]_{2}[NiI_{4}]. It can be made from triphenylmethylarsonium iodide and nickel iodide in hot ethanol. The red flakes that precipitate must be filtered before the ethanol cools, otherwise the compound begins to decompose.

Bis(tetraethylammonium) tetraiodonickelate has a molecular weight of 826.8135 and a CAS number of 13927-28-1. It has the chemical formula [(C_{2}H_{5})_{4}N]_{2}[NiI_{4}].
