= Nickel–iron battery =

Type of rechargeable battery

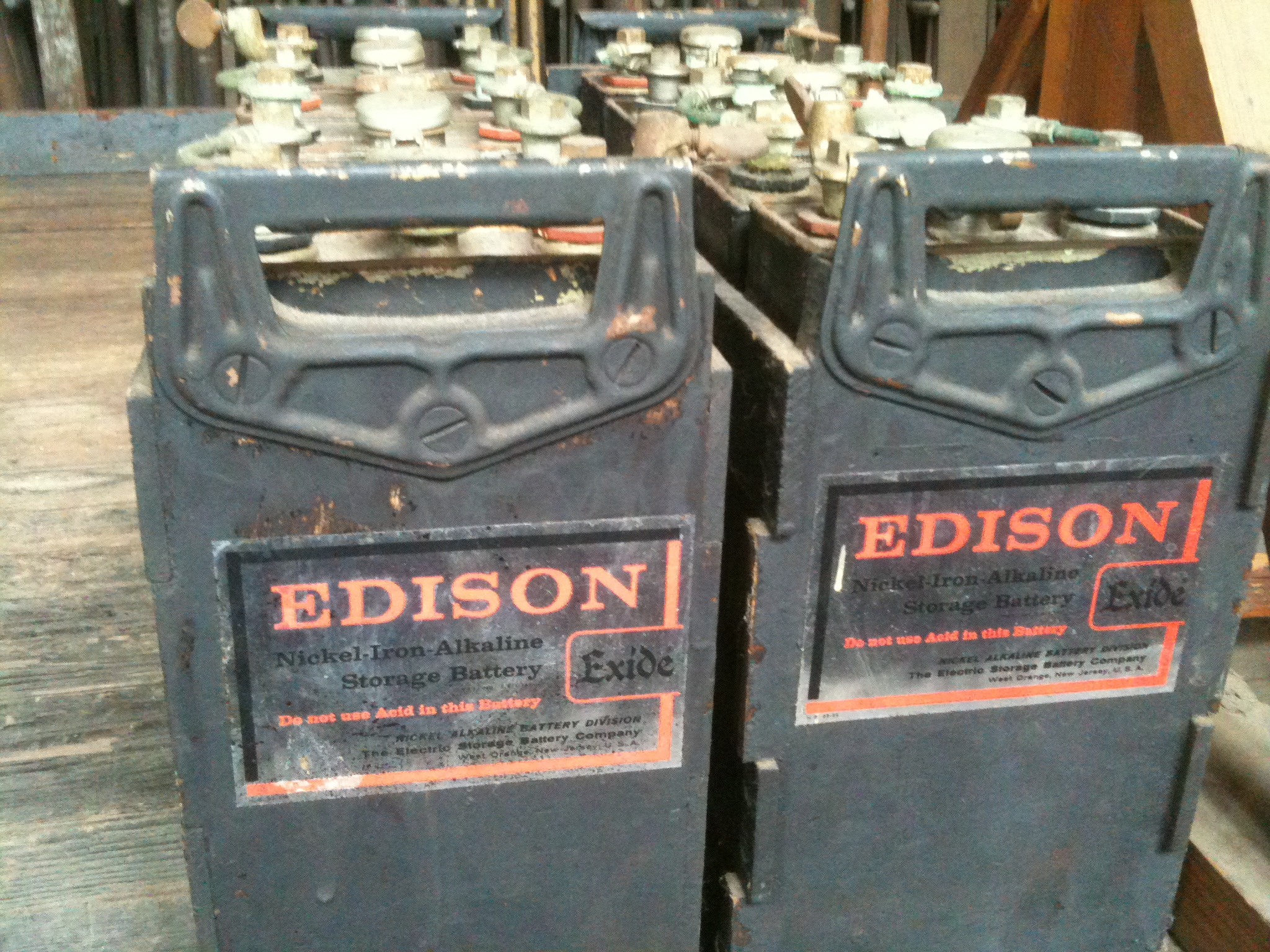
- Nickel–iron batteries manufactured between 1972 and 1975 under the "Exide" brand originally developed in 1901 by Thomas Edison.
- Specific energy: 19–25 Wh/kg
- Energy density: 30 Wh/L
- Specific power: 100 W/kg
- Charge/discharge efficiency: <65%
- Energy/consumer-price: 1.5 – 6.6 Wh/US$
- Self-discharge rate: 20% – 30%/month
- Time durability: 30 – 50 years
- Cycle durability: Repeated deep discharge does not reduce life significantly.
- Nominal cell voltage: 1.2 V
- Charge temperature interval: min. −40 °C – max.46 °C

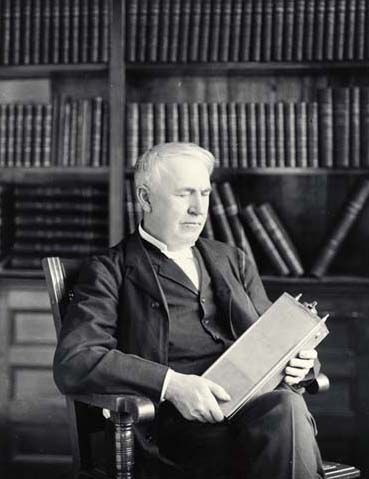
Thomas Edison in 1910 with a nickel-iron cell from his own production line

The nickel–iron battery (NiFe battery) is a rechargeable battery having nickel(III) oxide-hydroxide positive plates and iron negative plates, with an electrolyte of potassium hydroxide. The active materials are held in nickel-plated steel tubes or perforated pockets. It is a very robust battery which is tolerant of abuse, (overcharge, overdischarge, and short-circuiting) and can have very long life even if so treated. It is often used in backup situations where it can be continuously charged and can last for more than 20 years. Due to its low specific energy, poor charge retention, and high cost of manufacture, other types of rechargeable batteries have displaced the nickel–iron battery in most applications.

== Uses ==
Many railway vehicles use NiFe batteries. Some examples are London underground electric locomotives and New York City Subway car – R62A.

The technology has regained popularity for off-the-grid applications where daily charging makes it an appropriate technology.

== Battolyser ==
When nickel-iron and lead batteries are fully charged they start to produce hydrogen, which was seen as a disadvantage. Now, nickel–iron batteries are being investigated for use as combined batteries and electrolysis for hydrogen production for fuel cell cars and storage. These "battolysers" could be charged and discharged like conventional batteries, and would produce hydrogen when fully charged. 'Battolyser' is a registered trademark of the Dutch spin off of the University of Delft Battolyser Systems. In 2023 Battolyser has installed the first industrial-scale Battolyser system at the RWE Magnum power gasplant in Delfzijl.

== Durability ==
The ability of these batteries to survive frequent cycling is due to the low solubility of the reactants in the electrolyte. The formation of metallic iron during charge is slow because of the low solubility of the ferrous hydroxide. While the slow formation of iron crystals preserves the electrodes, it also limits the high rate performance: these cells charge slowly, and are only able to discharge slowly. Nickel–iron cells should not be charged from a constant voltage supply since they can be damaged by thermal runaway; the cell internal voltage drops as gassing begins, raising temperature, which increases current drawn and so further increases gassing and temperature.

== Electrochemistry ==
The half-cell reaction at the positive plate from black nickel(III) oxide-hydroxide NiO(OH) to green nickel(II) hydroxide Ni(OH)_{2} :

$$\ce{2 NiO(OH) + 2 H2O + 2 e- <=> 2 Ni(OH)2 + 2 OH-}$$

and at the negative plate:

$$\ce{Fe + 2 OH- <=>  Fe(OH)2 + 2 e-}$$

(Discharging is read left to right, charging is from right to left.)

The open-circuit voltage is 1.4 volts, dropping to 1.2 volts during discharge. The electrolyte mixture of potassium hydroxide and lithium hydroxide is not consumed in charging or discharging, so unlike a lead-acid battery the electrolyte specific gravity does not indicate state of charge. The voltage required to charge the NiFe battery is equal to or greater than 1.6 volts per cell. The inclusion of lithium hydroxide improves the performance of the cell. The equalization charge voltage is 1.65 volts.

== History ==
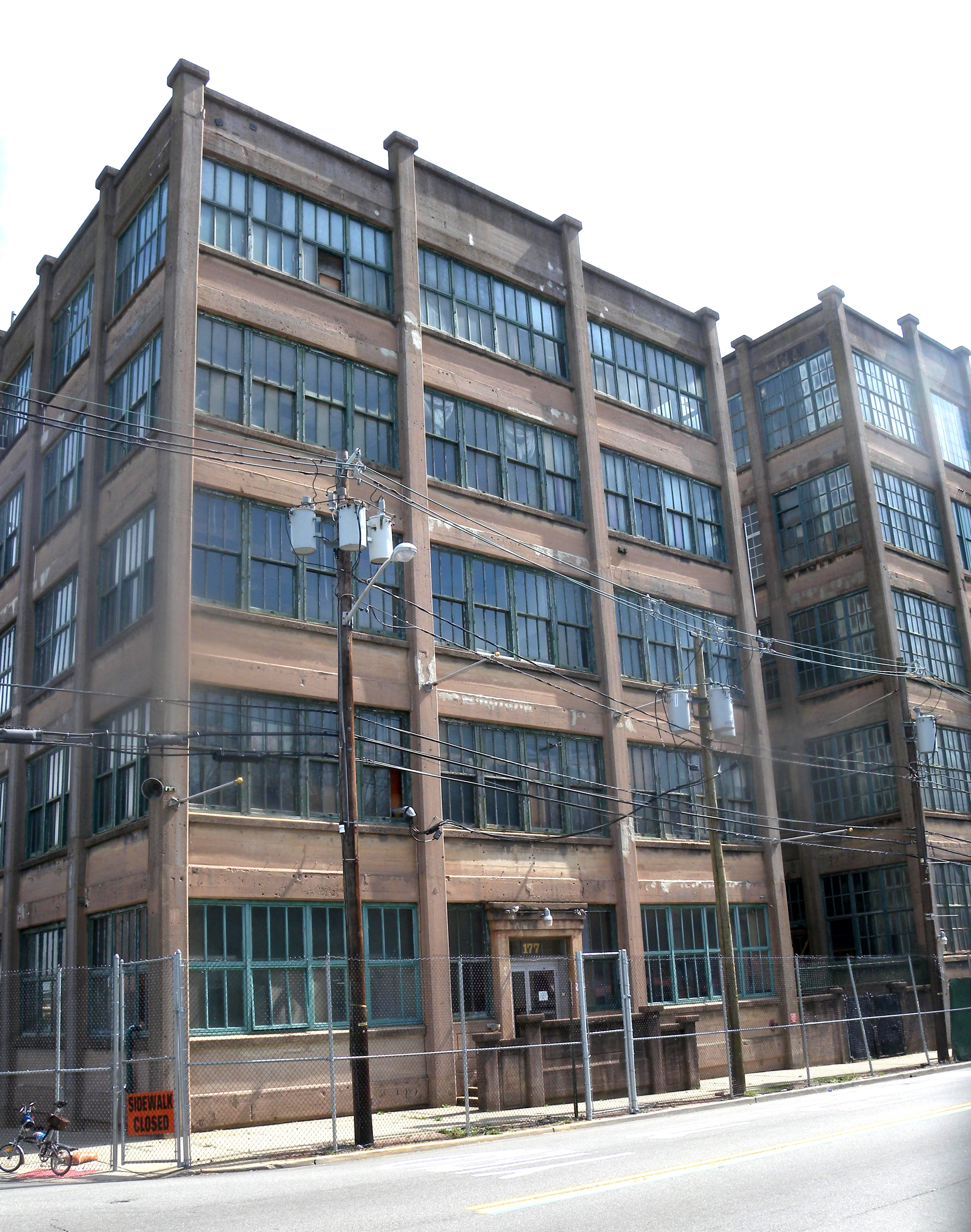
Edison Storage Battery Company

Swedish inventor Waldemar Jungner invented the nickel–cadmium battery in 1899. Jungner experimented with substituting iron for the cadmium in varying proportions, including 100% iron. Jungner discovered that the main advantage over the nickel–cadmium chemistry was cost, but due to the lower efficiency of the charging reaction and more pronounced formation of hydrogen (gassing), the nickel–iron technology was found wanting and abandoned. Jungner had several patents for the iron version of his battery (Swedish pat. Nos 8.558/1897, 10.177/1899, 11.132/1899, 11.487/1899 and German Patent No.110.210 /1899). Moreover, he had one patent for NiCd battery: Swed.pat No. 15.567/1899.

In 1901 Thomas Edison patented and commercialized NiFe in the United States and offered it as the energy source for electric vehicles, such as the Detroit Electric and Baker Electric. Edison claimed the nickel–iron design to be, "far superior to batteries using lead plates and acid" (lead–acid battery). Edison had several patents: U.S. patent 678,722/1901, U.S. patent 692,507/1902, and German patent No 157.290/1901.

Edison was disappointed that his battery was not adopted for starting internal combustion engines, and that electric vehicles went out of production only a few years after his battery was introduced. He developed the battery to be the battery of choice for electric vehicles, which were the preferred transportation mode in the early 1900s (followed by gasoline and steam). Edison's batteries had a significantly higher energy density than the lead–acid batteries in use at the time, and could be charged in half the time; however, they performed poorly at low temperatures, and were more expensive.

Jungner's work was largely unknown in the US until the 1940s, when nickel–cadmium batteries went into production there. A 50 volt nickel–iron battery was the main D.C. power supply in the World War II German V-2 rocket, together with two 16 volt batteries which powered the four gyroscopes (turbine powered generators supplied A.C. for its magnetic amplifier driven servomechanisms). A smaller version was used in the V-1 flying bomb. (viz. 1946 Operation Backfire blueprints.)

Edison's batteries were profitably made from about 1903 to 1972 by the Edison Storage Battery Company in West Orange, New Jersey. In 1972 the battery company was sold to the Exide Battery Corporation, which discontinued the product in 1975. The battery was widely used for railroad signaling, forklift, and standby power applications.

Nickel–iron cells were made with capacities from 5 to 1250 Ah. Many of the original manufacturers no longer make nickel iron cells, but production by new companies has started in several countries.

== Plate design of the original Edison battery ==
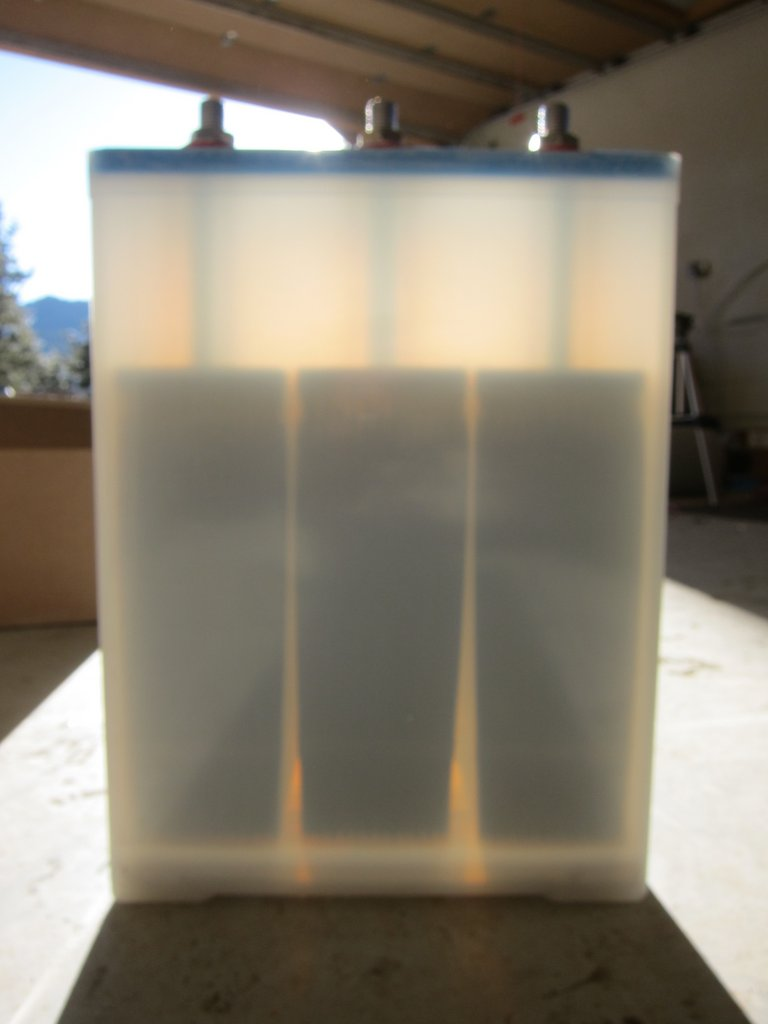
A modern nickel iron battery with three cells

The active material of the battery plates is contained in a number of filled tubes or pockets, securely mounted in a supporting and conducting frame or grid. The support is in good electrical contact with the tubes. The grid is a light skeleton frame, stamped from thin sheet steel, with reinforcing width at the top. The grids, as well as all other internal metal surfaces, are nickel-plated to prevent corrosion. The elements must remain covered with electrolyte; if they dry out, the negative plates oxidize and require a very long charge.

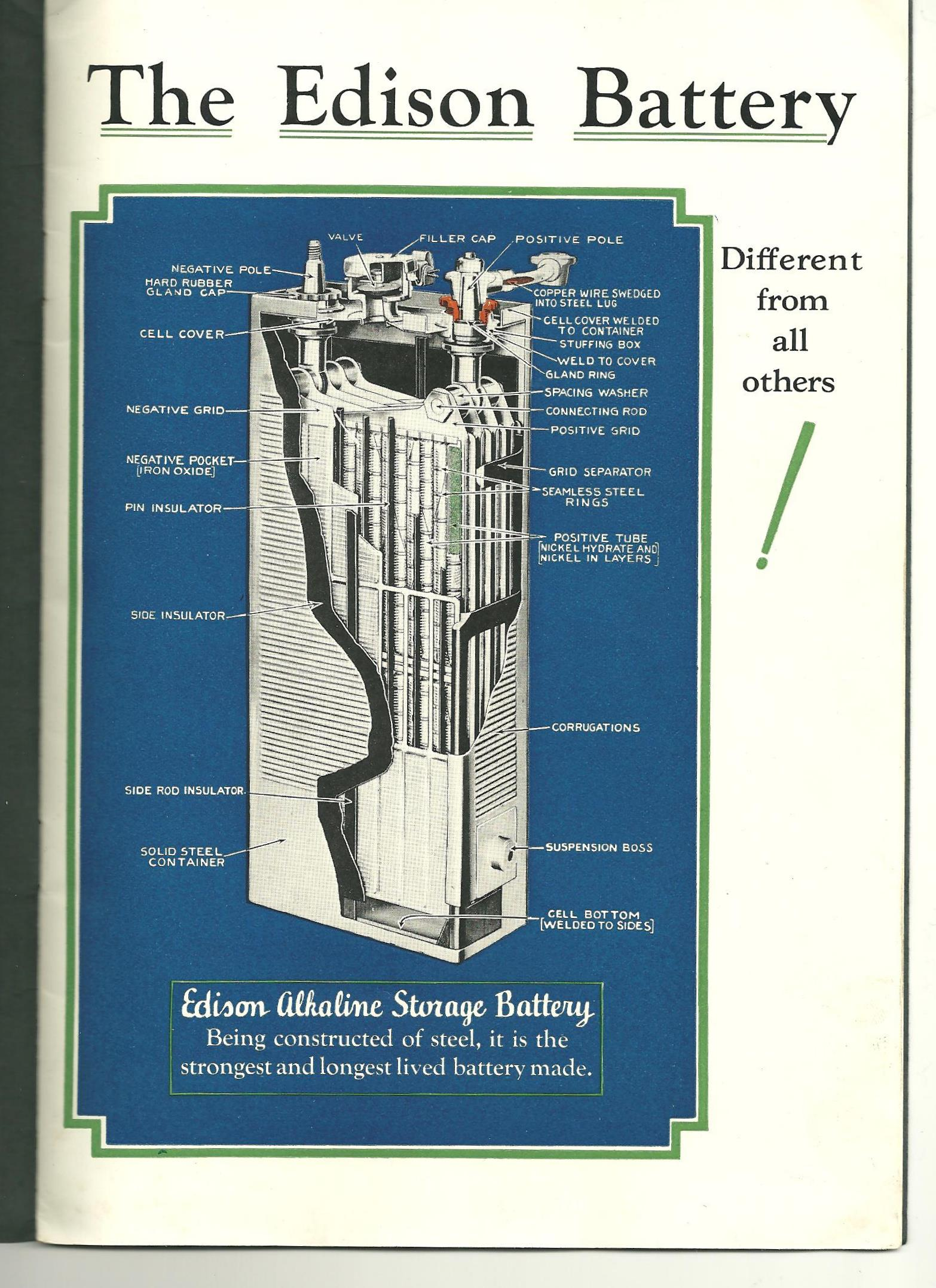
The elements of a nickel iron (NiFe) cell

The active material of the positive plates is a form of nickel hydrate. The tube retainers are made of thin steel ribbon, finely perforated and nickel-plated, about 4 in. long and 1/4 in. and 1/8in. in diameter. The ribbon is spirally wound, with lapped seams, and the tubes reinforced at about 1/2 in. intervals with small steel rings. Into these tubes nickel hydrate and pure flake nickel are loaded in thin, alternating layers (about 350 layers of each to a tube) and are tightly packed or rammed. The purpose of the flake nickel is to make good contact between the nickel hydrate and the tubes, and thereby provide conductivity. The tubes, when filled and closed, are then mounted vertically into the grids.

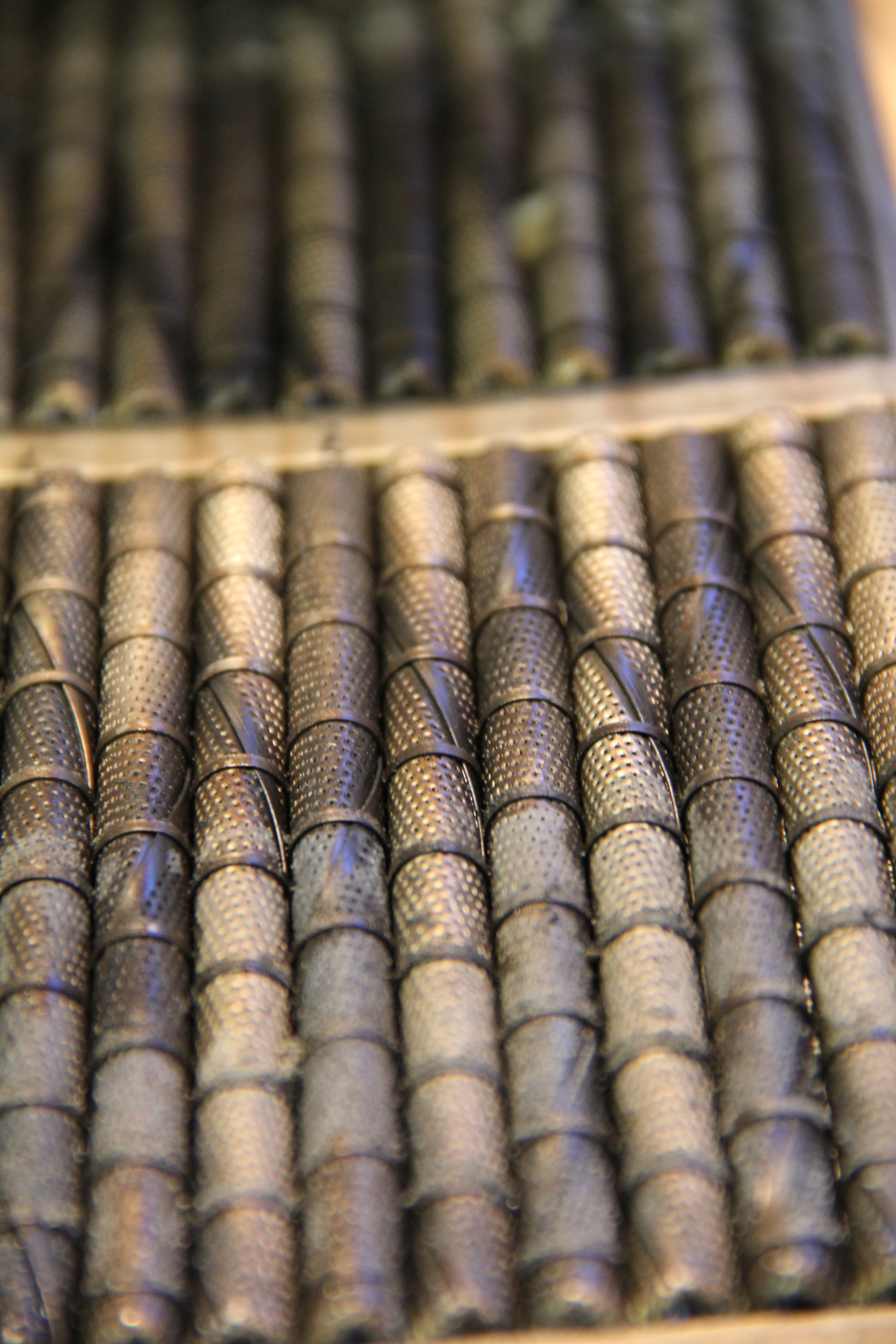
The positive plate is filled with nickel hydrate.

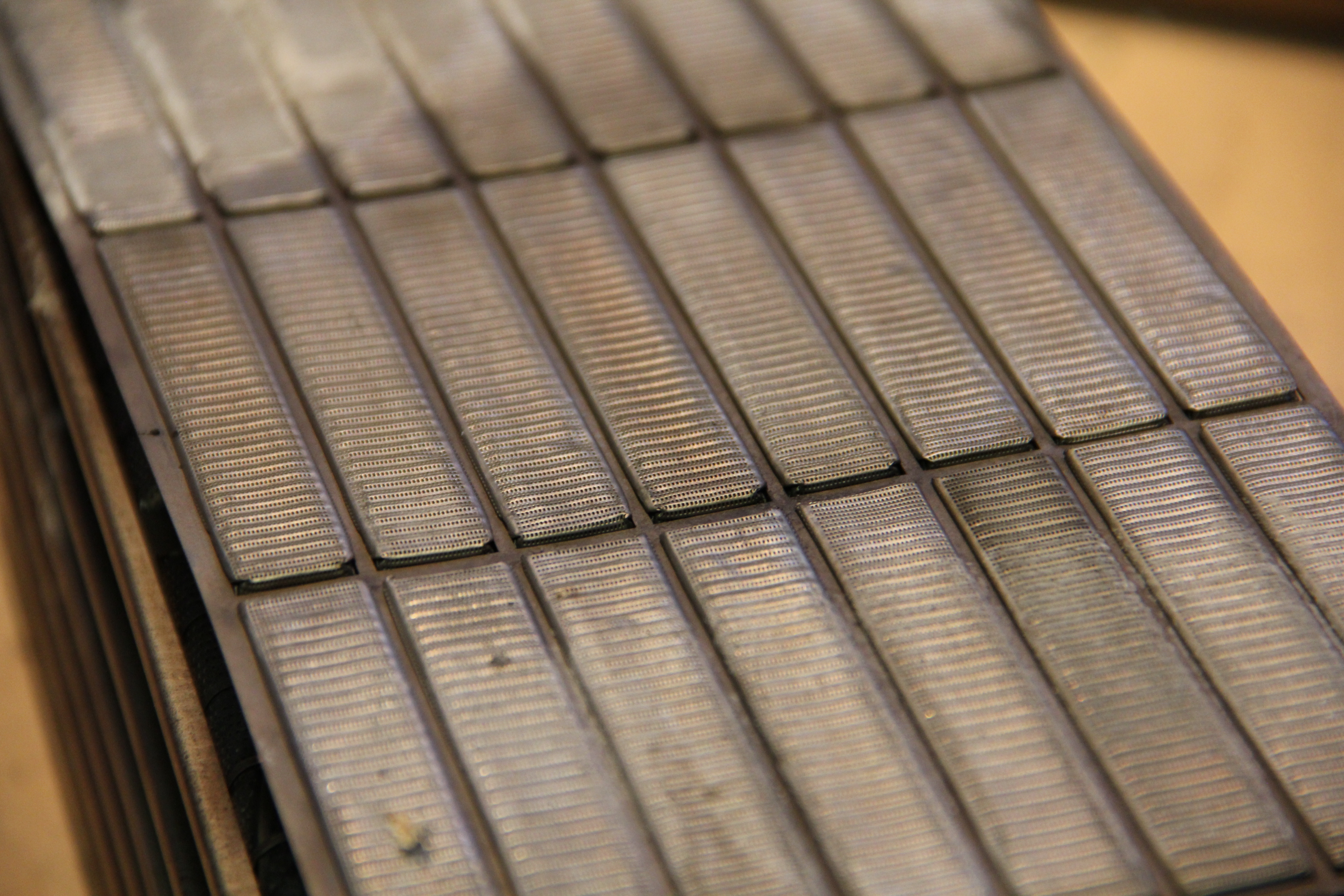
The active material of the negative plates iron oxide

The active material of the negative plates is iron oxide. The retainer pockets are made of thin, finely perforated nickel-plated steel, of rectangular shape, 1/2 in. wide, 3 in long and 1/8 in. maximum thickness. The iron oxide, in finely powdered form is tightly rammed into these pockets, after which they are mounted into the grids. After mounting they are pressed, forcing them into close contact with the grids. This corrugates the sides of the pockets to provide a spring contact of the pocket with the active material.

== Charge ==
Charge/discharge involves the transfer of oxygen from one electrode to the other (from one group of plates to the other). Hence this type of cell is sometimes called an oxygenlift cell. In a charged cell the active material of the positive plates is superoxidized, and that of the negative plates is in a spongy or reduced state.

If the normal capacity of the cell is insufficient, short increased rate charges can be given provided that the temperature of the electrolyte does not exceed 115˚ F / 46˚ C. These short charges are very efficient and cause no injury. Rates up to three times normal charge rate (defined as C, the current equal to the nominal capacity of the battery divided by 1 hour) can be employed for periods of 30 minutes.

Fully charging a NiFe cell consists of seven hours at the normal cell rate. In service the amount of charge given is governed by the extent of the previous discharge. For example, a battery discharged one-half, allows a 3.5 hour normal rate charge. Overcharging wastes current and causes rapid evaporation of the water in the electrolyte.

For tapering rates of charge, an average of 1.67 volts should be maintained across the cell terminals throughout the charge. The current value at the start of the charge varies according to the electrical resistance. Absent resistance, the starting rate will be about twice normal and the finishing rate about 40% of normal.

== Discharge ==
Under discharge the positive plates are reduced ("deoxidized"); the oxygen, with its natural affinity for iron, goes to the negative plates, oxidizing them. It is permissible to discharge continuously at any rate up to 25% above normal, and for short periods at up to six times normal. When the discharge rate exceeds this value, abnormal voltage drops will occur.

== Electrolyte ==
The electrolyte does not enter into chemical combination to perform the functions of the cell, acting as a conveyor. Its specific gravity is unaffected during charge and discharge other than through evaporation and changes in temperature. Considerable variation in specific gravity is permissible, having influence only on battery efficiency.

== Environmental impact ==
Nickel–iron batteries do not have the lead or cadmium of the lead–acid and nickel–cadmium batteries, which require treatment as hazardous materials.

== See also ==
- List of battery types
- List of battery sizes
- Comparison of battery types
- Nickel–zinc battery
