= Nickel selenide =

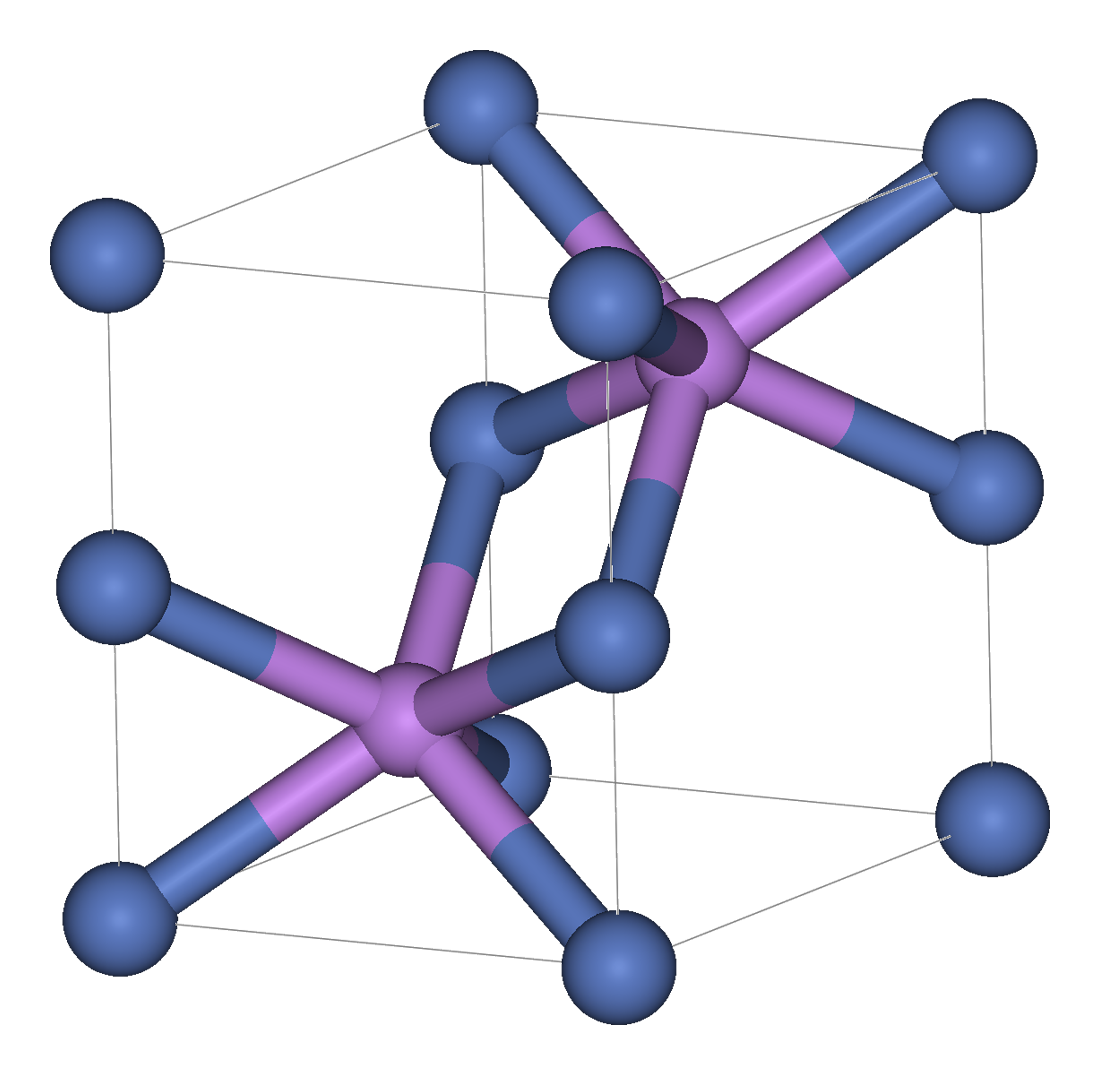
- Stoichiometric NiSe: Ni Se

Names
- IUPAC name Nickel(II) selenide
- Other names Nickel selenide

Identifiers
CAS Number	1314-05-2
3D model (JSmol)	Interactive image
ChemSpider	56182
ECHA InfoCard	100.013.834
EC Number	215-216-2
PubChem CID	62394
UNII	KB76MY8R90
CompTox Dashboard (EPA)	DTXSID00157023
- InChI: InChI=1S/Ni.Se Key: QHASIAZYSXZCGO-UHFFFAOYSA-N
- SMILES: [Ni].[Se]

Properties
Chemical formula	NiSe
Molar mass	137.65 g/mol
Appearance	black powder
Density	7.2 g/cm^{3}
Solubility in water	Insoluble

Hazards
- GHS labelling
Pictograms	(GHS07: Exclamation mark) (GHS08: Health hazard) (GHS09: Environmental hazard)
Signal word	Danger
Hazard statements	H317, H350, H372, H410
Precautionary statements	P203, P260, P264, P270, P272, P273, P280, P302+P352, P318, P319, P321, P333+P317, P362+P364, P391, P405, P501
- Except where otherwise noted, data are given for materials in their standard state (at 25 °C [77 °F], 100 kPa). Infobox references

Nickel selenide is the inorganic compound with the formula NiSe. As for many metal chalcogenides, the phase diagram for nickel(II) selenide is complicated. Two other selenides of nickel are known, NiSe_{2} with a pyrite structure, and Ni_{2}Se_{3}. Additionally, NiSe is usually nonstoichiometric and is often described with the formula Ni_{1−x}Se, with 0 < x < 0.15. This material is a semi-conducting solid, and can be obtained as in the form of a black fine powder, or silver if obtained in the form of larger crystals. Nickel(II) selenide is insoluble in all solvents, but can be degraded by strongly oxidizing acids.

== Synthesis and structure ==
Typically, NiSe is prepared by high temperature reaction of the elements. Such reactions typically afford mixed phase products. Milder methods have also been described using more specialised techniques such as reactions of the elements in liquid ammonia in a pressure vessel.

Like many related materials, nickel(II) selenide adopts the nickel arsenide motif. In this structure, nickel is octahedral and the selenides are in trigonal prismatic sites.
