= Nickel oxide hydroxide =

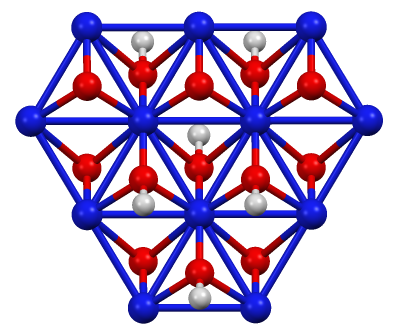

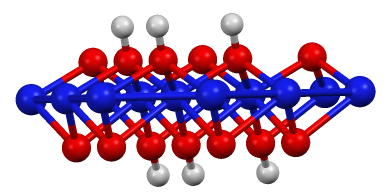

Names
- Other names Nickel Oxyhydroxide

Identifiers
CAS Number	12026-04-9
3D model (JSmol)	Interactive image
ChemSpider	17616611
EC Number	805-483-9
PubChem CID	16684208
- InChI: InChI=1S/Ni.H2O.O/h;1H2;/q+1;;/p-1 Key: VUFYPLUHTVSSGR-UHFFFAOYSA-M
- SMILES: O[Ni]=O

Properties
Chemical formula	Ni(O)(OH)
Molar mass	91.699 g/mol
Appearance	black solid
Melting point	230 °C (446 °F; 503 K)

Hazards
- GHS labelling
Pictograms	(GHS07: Exclamation mark) (GHS08: Health hazard) (GHS09: Environmental hazard)
Signal word	Danger
Hazard statements	H302, H317, H332, H351, H410
Precautionary statements	P203, P261, P264, P270, P271, P272, P273, P280, P301+P317, P302+P352, P304+P340, P317, P318, P321, P330, P333+P317, P362+P364, P391, P405, P501
- Except where otherwise noted, data are given for materials in their standard state (at 25 °C [77 °F], 100 kPa). Infobox references

Nickel oxide hydroxide is the inorganic compound with the chemical formula NiO(OH). It is a black solid that is insoluble in all solvents but attacked by base and acid. It is a component of the nickel–metal hydride battery, the nickel–iron battery, and the nickel–cadmium battery.

== Related materials ==
Nickel(III) oxides are often poorly characterized and are assumed to be nonstoichiometric compounds. Nickel(III) oxide (Ni_{2}O_{3}) has not been verified crystallographically. For applications in organic chemistry, nickel oxides or peroxides are generated in situ and lack crystallographic characterization. For example, "nickel peroxide" (CAS# 12035-36-8) is also closely related to or even identical with NiO(OH).

== Synthesis and structure ==
Its layered structure resembles that of the brucite polymorph of nickel(II) hydroxide, but with half as many hydrogens. The oxidation state of nickel is +3. It can be prepared by the reaction of nickel(II) hydroxide with aqueous potassium hydroxide and bromine as the oxidant:

2 Ni(OH)_{2} + 2 KOH + Br_{2} → 2 KBr + 2 H_{2}O + 2 NiOOH

== Use in organic chemistry ==
Nickel(III) oxides catalyze the oxidation of benzyl alcohol to benzoic acid using bleach:

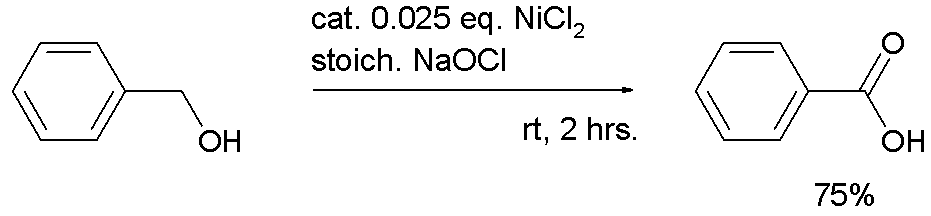

Similarly it catalyzes the double oxidation of 3-butenoic acid to fumaric acid:

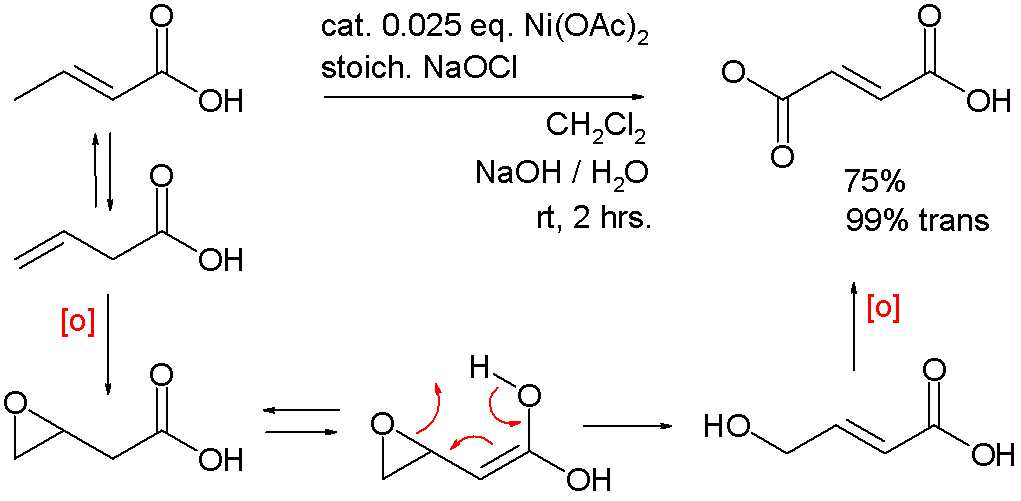
