= Oxonickelates =

Ion

Nickel forms a series of mixed oxide compounds which are commonly called nickelates. A nickelate is an anion containing nickel or a salt containing a nickelate anion, or a double compound containing nickel bound to oxygen and other elements. Nickel can be in different or even mixed oxidation states, ranging from +1, +2, +3 to +4. The anions can contain a single nickel ion, or multiple to form a cluster ion. The solid mixed oxide compounds are often ceramics, but can also be metallic. They have a variety of electrical and magnetic properties. Rare-earth elements form a range of perovskite nickelates, in which the properties vary systematically as the rare-earth element changes. Fine tuning of properties is achievable with mixtures of elements, applying stress or pressure, or varying the physical form.

Inorganic chemists call many compounds that contain nickel centred anions "nickelates". These include the chloronickelates, fluoronickelates, tetrabromonickelates, tetraiodonickelates, cyanonickelates, nitronickelates and other nickel-organic acid complexes such as oxalatonickelates.

== Alkali nickelates ==
The lithium nickelates are of interest to researchers as cathodes in lithium cells, as these substance can hold a variable amount of lithium, with the nickel varying in oxidation state.

== Rare-earth nickelates ==
Rare-earth nickelates were first made by Demazeau et al. in 1971, by heating a mixture of oxides under high pressure oxygen, or potassium perchlorate. For two decades after that these nickelates received very little attention. Many rare-earth nickelates have the Ruddlesden–Popper phase structure.

Rare-earth nickelates with nickel in a +1 oxidation state have an electronic configuration to same as for cuprates and so are of interest to high-temperature superconductor researchers. Other rare-earth nickelates can function as fuel cell catalysts. The ability to switch between an insulating and a conducting state in some of these materials is of interest in the development of new transistors, that have higher on to off current ratios.

== List of oxides ==
formula	name	other names	structure	Remarks	references
LiNiO_{2}	lithium nickelate		rhombohedral a = 2.88 Å, c = 14.2 Å, density = 4.78 / 4.81		
Li_{2}NiO_{3}			monoclinic C2/m a = 4.898 Å, b = 8.449 Å, c = 4.9692 Å, β = 109.02°, V = 194.60 Å^{3}	Nickel in +4 state	
NaNiO_{2}	sodium nickelate		monoclinic a = 5.33 Å, b = 2.86 Å, c = 5.59 Å, β = 110°30′, Z = 2, density = 4.74; over 220 °C: rhombohedral a = 2.96 Å, b = 15.77 Å	Carbon dissolved in the molten salt can precipitate diamond.	
KNiO_{2}	potassium nickelate				
SrTiNiO_{3}	strontium titanate nickelate	STN			
YNiO_{3}	yttrium nickelate		monoclinic P2_{1}/n; orthorhombic a = 5.516 Å, b = 7.419 Å, c = 5.178 Å, V = 211.9 Å^{3}, Z = 4, density = 6.13	insulator changes to metal under pressure	
Y_{2}BaNiO_{5}	chain nickelate		Orthorhombic Immm, a = 3.7589, b = 5.7604, c = 11.3311		
2H-AgNiO_{2}			hexagonal P6_{3}/mmc, a = 2.93653 Å, b = 2.93653 Å, c = 12.2369 Å, V = 91.384 Å^{3}, Z = 2, density = 7.216 g/cm^{3}	Ni in +3 state	
3R-AgNiO_{2}			trigonal R3̅2/m, a = 2.9390 Å, c = 18.3700 Å	Ni in +3 state	
Ag_{2}NiO_{2}	silveroxonickelate		trigonal R3̅2/m, a = 2.926 Å, c = 24.0888 Å	lustrous black solid, stable in air; Ni^{3+} and subvalent Ag_{2}^{+}	
Ag_{3}Ni_{2}O_{4}			hexagonal P6_{3}/mmc, a = 2.9331 Å, b = 2.9331 Å, c = 28.31 Å, V = 210.9 Å^{3}, Z = 2, density = 7.951 g/cm^{3}	electric conductor	
BaNiO_{2}			orthorhombic a = 5.73 Å, b = 9.2 Å, c = 4.73 Å, V = 249 Å^{3}, Z = 4	black	
BaNiO_{3}			hexagonal a = 5.580 Å, c = 4.832 Å, V = 130.4 Å^{3}, Z = 2	black powder dec 730 °C N-type semiconductor; decompose in acid	
Ba_{2}Ni_{2}O_{5}			hexagonal a = 5.72, c = 4.30, density = 6.4	black needles melt 1200 °C	
LaNiO_{2}	lanthanum nickelite		a = 3.959, c = 3.375	Ni in +1 state	
LaNiO_{3}	lanthanum nickelate		a = 5.4827 Å, b = 5.4827 Å, c = 3.2726 Å, γ = 120°, V = 345.5, Z = 6, density = 7.08	metallic, no insulating transition polar metal	
La_{2}NiO_{4}		LN	tetragonal a = 3.86 Å, b = 3.86 Å, c = 12.67 Å, V = 188.8 Å^{3}, Z = 2, density = 7.05		
La_{3}Ni_{2}O_{6}			tetragonal a = 3.968 Å, c = 19.32 Å		
La_{3}Ni_{2}O_{7}			a = 5.3961 Å, b = 5.4498 Å, c = 20.522 Å, V = 603.5, Z = 4, density = 7.1	superconductor under pressure T_{c}=80K	
La_{4}Ni_{3}O_{8}				antiferromagnetic below 105 K, mixed valence I and II	
La_{4}Ni_{3}O_{10}					
La_{2−x}Sr_{x}NiO_{4}		LSN	a varies from 3.86 to 3.81 as x changes from 0 to 0.5, then ≈ 3.81; c ≈ 12.7 for x ≤ 0.8, the it falls to 12.4 at x = 1.2	polarization-specific metal	
CeNiO_{3}	cerium nickelate			decomposes 1984 °C	
PrNiO_{2}					
PrNiO_{3}			perovskite	metallic insulator transition=130K	
Pr_{4}Ni_{3}O_{8}					
Pr_{2}BaNiO_{5}	chain nickelate		Orthorhombic		
La_{2}PrNi_{2}O_{7}			orthorhombic		
La_{2}PrNi_{2}O_{7}			tetragonal	Superconductor under pressure Tc = 82.5 K	
NdNiO_{3}	neodymium nickelate		perovskite orthorhombic Pbnm, a = 5.38712 Å, b = 5.38267 Å, c = 7.60940 Å	metallic insulator transition=200K	
NdNiO_{2}			orthorhombic a = 5.402 Å, b = 7.608 Å, c = 5.377 Å, V = 221.0 Å^{3}, density = 7.54		
Nd_{4}Ni_{3}O_{8}			orthorhombic a = 3.9171 Å, b = 3.9171 Å, c = 25.307 Å, V = 388.3 Å^{3}, Z = 2, density = 7.54		
Nd_{2}NiO_{4}			Cmca a = 5.383 Å, b = 12.342 Å, c = 5.445 Å, V = 361.7 Å^{3}, density = 7.55		
Nd_{2}BaNiO_{5}	chain nickelate		Orthorhombic Immm, a = 2.8268 Å, b = 5.9272 Å, c = 11.651 Å		
SmNiO_{3}	samarium nickelate	SNO	perovskite Pnma, a = 5.431 Å, b = 7.568 Å, c = 5.336 Å, V = 219.3 Å, Z = 4, density = 7.79	metallic insulator transition=400K	
Sm_{1.5}Sr_{0.5}NiO_{4}		SSNO	orthorhombic Bmab	giant dielectric constant 100,000	
EuNiO_{3}	europium nickelate		perovskite orthorhombic a = 5.466 Å, b = 7.542 Å, c = 5.293 Å, V = 218.2 Å^{3}, Z = 4, density = 7.87	metallic insulator transition=460K	
GdNiO_{3}	gadolinium nickelate		perovskite orthorhombic a = 0.5492 Å, b = 0.7506 Å, c = 0.5258 Å, V = 216.8 Å^{3}, Z = 4, density = 8.09	metallic insulator transition=510.9K	
Gd_{2}NiO_{4}	digadolinium nickelate		Orthorhombic a = 3.851 Å, b = 3.851 Å, c = 6.8817 Å, V = 187.5 Å^{3}, Z = 2, density = 7.75		
BaGd_{2}NiO_{5}	barium digadolinium nickelate	chain nickellate	?orthorhombic	low thermal conductance	
Tb_{2}BaNiO_{5}	chain nickelate		Orthorhombic		
DyNiO_{3}	dysprosium nickelate		perovskite orthorhombic a = 0.55 Å, b = 0.7445 Å, c = 0.5212 Å V=213.4 Z=4 density=8.38	metallic insulator transition=564.1K	
Dy_{2}BaNiO_{5}	chain nickelate		Orthorhombic		
HoNiO_{3}	holmium nickelate		perovskite orthorhombic a = 3.96 Å, b = 3.96 Å, c = 5.04 Å, V = 212 Å^{3} Z = 4, density=8.51	metallic insulator transition=560K	
Ho_{2}BaNiO_{5}	chain nickelate		Orthorhombic Immm, a = 3.764 Å, b = 5.761 Å, c=11.336 Å		
ErNiO_{3}	erbium nickelate		perovskite orthorhombic a = 5.514 Å, b =7.381 Å, c = 5.16 V=201 Z=4 density=8.67	metallic insulator transition=580K	
Er_{2}BaNiO_{5}	chain nickelate		Orthorhombic Immm a = 3.7541 Å, b = 5.7442 Å c=11.3019 Å V=243.71 Å^{3} Z=2		
TmNiO_{3}	thulium nickelate		orthorhombic a = 5.495 Å, b = 7.375 Å, c = 5.149 Å V = 208.7 Z = 4 density = 8.77		
Tm_{2}BaNiO_{5}	thulium barium nickelate		Orthorhombic low temperature Pnma a = 12.2003 Å b = 5.65845 Å c = 6.9745 Å Z = 4; high T: Immm a = 3.75128 b = 5.7214 c = 11.2456	Pnma form is brown Immm form is dark green	
YbNiO_{3}	ytterbium nickelate		Orthorhombic a = 5.496 Å, b = 7.353 Å, c = 5.131 Å Z=4 V=207.4 Å^{3} density=8.96		
Yb_{2}BaNiO_{5}	ytterbium barium nickelate		Orthorhombic Pnma a = 5.6423 Å, b = 6.9545 Å, c = 12.1583 Å V=477.1 Z=4 density=8.66	Pnma form is brown	
LuNiO_{3}	lutetium nickelate		perovskite a = 5.499 Å, b = 7.356 Å, c = 5.117 Å, V = 207 Å^{3}, Z = 4, density = 9.04	metallic insulator transition=600K	
Lu_{2}BaNiO_{5}			Orthorhombic Pnma		
TlNiO_{3}	thallium nickelate(III)		perovskite a = 5.2549 Å, b = 5.3677 Å, c = 7.5620 Å, V = 213.3 Å^{3}		
PbNiO_{3}					
BiNiO_{3}	bismuth nickelate(III)		perovskite triclinic a = 5.3852, b = 5.6498, c = 7.7078 Å, α = 91.9529°, β = 89.8097°, γ = 91.5411, V = 234.29 Å^{3}	Ni in +2 state, Bi in +3 and +5; stable 5–420K, antiferromagnetic	

== See also ==
- Nickel manganese oxides for what are considered nickel manganates
