= Nickel(III) oxide =

Nickel (III) oxide
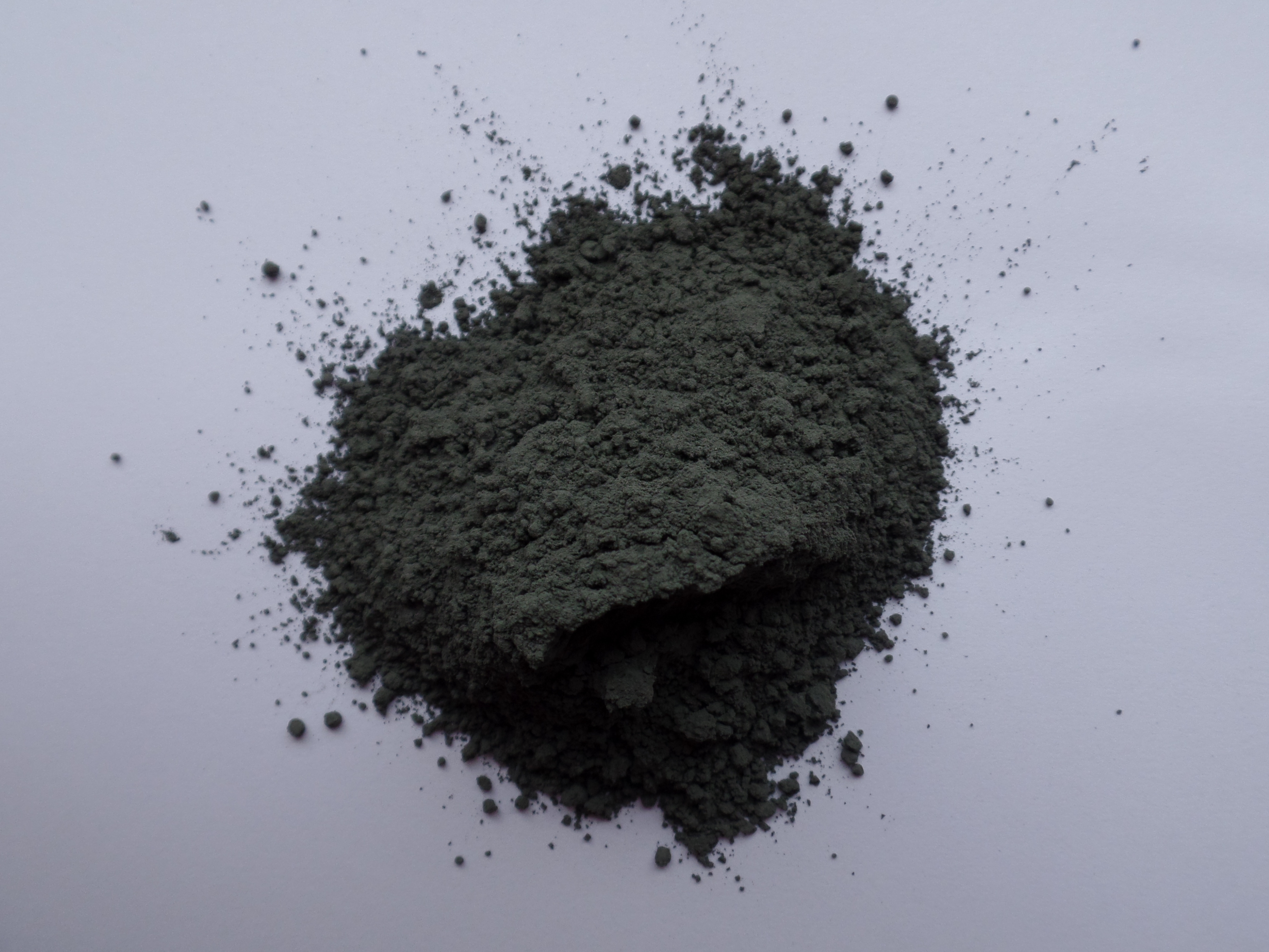
- Nickel (III) oxide powder

Names
- IUPAC name Nickel (III) oxide
- Other names Nickel sesquioxide, nickel trioxide

Identifiers
CAS Number	1314-06-3
3D model (JSmol)	Interactive image
ChemSpider	8488737
ECHA InfoCard	100.013.835
EC Number	215-217-8
PubChem CID	10313272
RTECS number	QR8420000
UNII	07BD7540U5
CompTox Dashboard (EPA)	DTXSID60893854
- InChI: InChI=1S/2Ni.3O/q2*+3;3*-2 Key: GNMQOUGYKPVJRR-UHFFFAOYSA-N
- SMILES: [O-2].[O-2].[O-2].[Ni+3].[Ni+3]

Properties
Chemical formula	Ni_{2}O_{3}
Molar mass	165.39 g/mol
Appearance	black-dark gray solid
Density	4.84 g/cm^{3}
Melting point	600 °C (1,112 °F; 873 K) (decomposes)
Solubility in water	negligible

Hazards
NFPA 704 (fire diamond)	2 0 0
- Except where otherwise noted, data are given for materials in their standard state (at 25 °C [77 °F], 100 kPa). verify (what is ?) Infobox references

Nickel (III) oxide is the inorganic compound with the formula Ni_{2}O_{3}. It is not well characterized, and is sometimes referred to as black nickel oxide. Traces of Ni_{2}O_{3} on nickel surfaces have been mentioned.

Nickel (III) oxide has been studied theoretically since the early 1930s, supporting its unstable nature at standard temperatures. A nanostructured pure phase of the material was synthesized and stabilized for the first time in 2015 from the reaction of nickel(II) nitrate with sodium hypochlorite and characterized using powder X-ray diffraction and electron microscopy.
