= Tetraethylammonium nitrate =

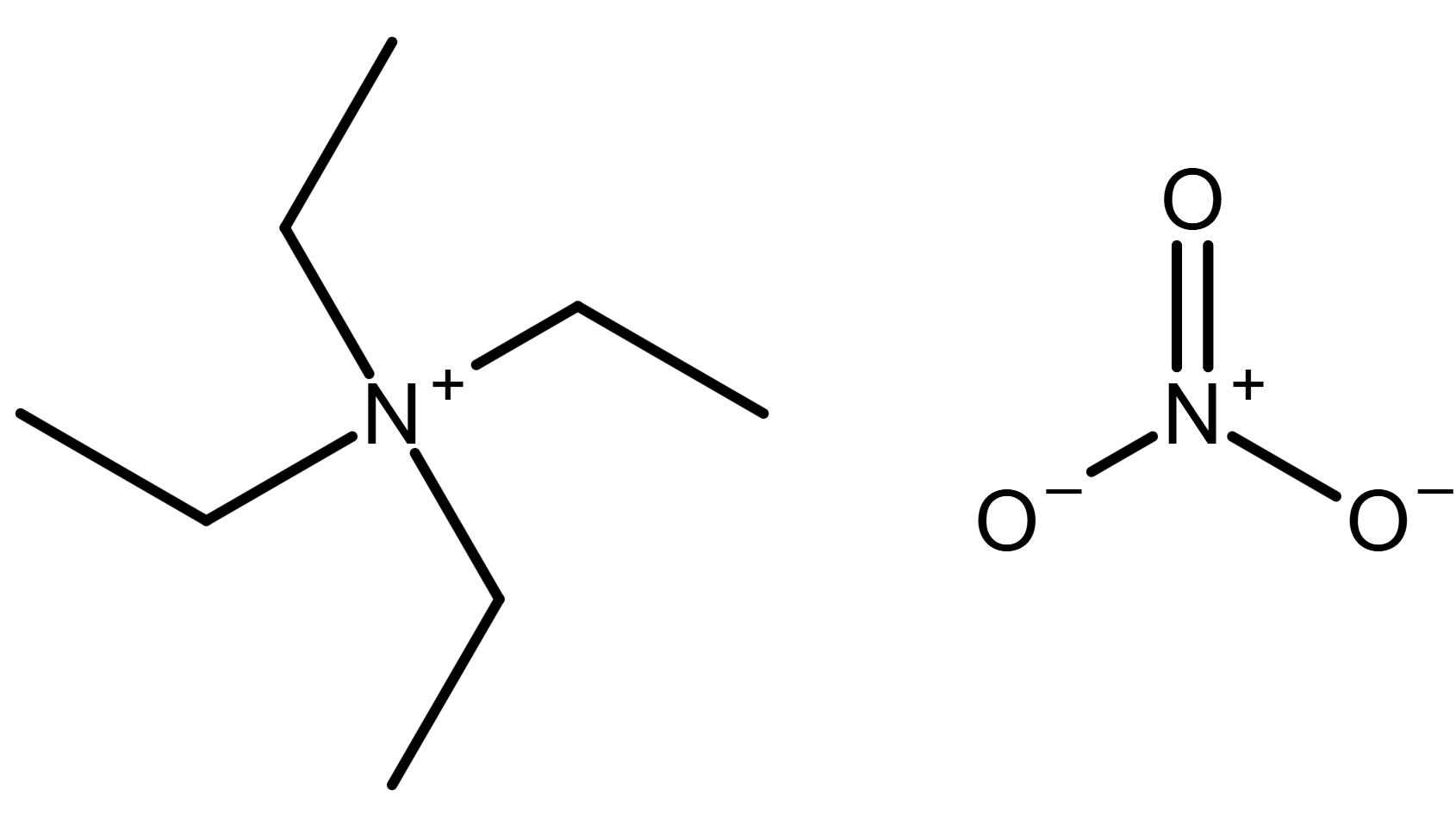

Names
- IUPAC name Tetraethylazanium nitrate
- Other names: Ethanaminium, N,N,N-triethyl-, nitrate (1:1); N,N,N-Triethylethanaminium nitrate; Ammonium, tetraethyl-, nitrate

Identifiers
CAS Number	1941-26-0
3D model (JSmol)	Interactive image
ChemSpider	67316
ECHA InfoCard	100.016.114
EC Number	217-725-5
PubChem CID	74744
UNII	8W6G3DV8T2
CompTox Dashboard (EPA)	DTXSID3062075
- InChI: InChI=1S/C8H20N.NO3/c1-5-9(6-2,7-3)8-4;2-1(3)4/h5-8H2,1-4H3;/q+1;-1 Key: JTJKNAJRGLQKDZ-UHFFFAOYSA-N
- SMILES: [N+](CC)(CC)(CC)CC.[N+](=O)([O-])[O-]

Properties
Chemical formula	[(CH_{3}CH_{2})_{4}N]NO_{3}
Molar mass	192.259 g·mol^{−1}
Appearance	Colorless hygroscopic crystals
Density	1.1622 g/cm^{3}
Melting point	280 °C (536 °F; 553 K) (decomposition)
Solubility in water	Soluble

Hazards
- GHS labelling
Pictograms	(GHS03: Oxidizing) (GHS07: Exclamation mark)
Signal word	Danger
Hazard statements	H272, H315, H319, H335
Precautionary statements	P210, P220, P261, P264, P264+P265, P271, P280, P302+P352, P304+P340, P305+P351+P338, P319, P321, P332+P317, P337+P317, P362+P364, P370+P378, P403+P233, P405, P501

Related compounds
Other anions	Tetraethylammonium fluoride; Tetraethylammonium chloride; Tetraethylammonium bromide; Tetraethylammonium iodide; Tetraethylammonium trichloride; Tetraethylammonium cyanide; Tetraethylammonium perchlorate; Tetraethylammonium tetrachloroferrate; Tetraethylammonium tetrachloronickelate
Other cations	Tetramethylammonium nitrate
- Except where otherwise noted, data are given for materials in their standard state (at 25 °C [77 °F], 100 kPa). Infobox references

Tetraethylammonium nitrate is a chemical compound with the chemical formula [(CH_{3}CH_{2})_{4}N]NO_{3}. It is a colorless crystalline solid. It is a quaternary ammonium salt. It consists of tetraethylammonium cations [(CH_{3}CH_{2})_{4}N]^{+} and nitrate anions NO^{−}_{3}.

== Synthesis ==
Tetraethylammonium nitrate can be synthesized by reaction between tetraethylammonium hydroxide and nitric acid (see synthesis of tetraethylammonium salts).

[(CH_{3}CH_{2})_{4}N]OH + HNO_{3} → [(CH_{3}CH_{2})_{4}N]NO_{3} + H_{2}O

== Uses ==
Using tetraethylammonium nitrate as an electrolyte additive in ethylene carbonate solvent, the Li/Cu rechargeable batteries can stably run over 1000 hours. This battery has a high energy density.
