= List of compounds with carbon number 8 =

This is a partial list of molecules that contain 8 carbon atoms.

Chemical formula	Synonyms	CAS number
C_{8}ClF_{15}O	perfluorooctanoyl chloride	335-64-8
C_{8}Cl_{4}N_{2}	tetrachloroisophthalonitrile	1897-45-6
C_{8}Co_{2}O_{8}	dicobalt octacarbonyl	10210-68-1
C_{8}F_{4}N_{2}	tetrafluorophthalonitrile	1835-65-0
C_{8}F_{14}O_{3}	heptafluorobutyric anhydride	336-59-4
C_{8}F_{16}	perfluoroethylcyclohexane	335-21-7
C_{8}F_{17}I	perfluorooctyl iodide	507-63-1
C_{8}F_{18}	perfluorooctane	307-34-6
C_{8}H(NO_{2})_{7}	heptanitrocubane	99393-62-1
C_{8}H_{2}Cl_{4}O_{2}	fthalide	27355-22-2
C_{8}H_{2}F_{4}O_{4}	tetrafluorophthalic acid	652-03-9
C_{8}H_{3}Cl_{5}O_{2}	pentachlorophenyl acetate	1441-02-7
C_{8}H_{4}FeO_{4}	cyclobutadienecarboxaldehydeiron tricarbonyl	33056-62-1
C_{8}H_{4}N_{2}	phthalonitrile	91-15-6
C_{8}H_{4}N_{2}S_{2}	bitoscanate	4044-65-9
C_{8}H_{4}O_{3}	phthalic anhydride	85-44-9
C_{8}H_{5}Ag	silver phenylacetylenide	33440-88-9
C_{8}H_{5}BrMoO_{3}	cyclopentadienylmolybdenumtricarbonyl bromide	12079-79-7
C_{8}H_{5}Cl_{3}O_{3}	tricamba	2307-49-5
C_{8}H_{5}Cl_{5}	pentachloroethylbenzene	606-07-5
C_{8}H_{5}CrO_{3}	cyclopentadienylchromium tricarbonyl	12079-91-3
C_{8}H_{5}Cu	copper phenylacetylenide	13146-23-1
C_{8}H_{5}F_{5}O	pentafluoroethoxybenzene	1644-22-0
C_{8}H_{5}MnO_{2}S	cyclopentadienylmanganesedicarbonylthiocarbonyl	31741-76-1
C_{8}H_{5}NOS	benzoyl isothiocyanate	532-55-8
C_{8}H_{5}NO_{2}	isatin	91-56-5
C_{8}H_{5}NO_{2}	phthalimide	85-41-6
C_{8}H_{5}NO_{3}	isatoic anhydride	118-48-9
C_{8}H_{5}N_{3}	pyridinium dicyanomethylide	27032-01-5
C_{8}H_{6}	cubene radical	77478-10-5
C_{8}H_{6}	cyclooctatrienyne radical	4514-69-6
C_{8}H_{6}	phenylacetylene	536-74-3
C_{8}H_{6}Cl_{2}O_{3}	dicamba	1918-00-9
C_{8}H_{6}Cl_{3}NO_{3}	triclopyr methyl ester	60825-26-5
C_{8}H_{6}Cl_{4}O_{2}	tetrachloroveratrole	944-61-6
C_{8}H_{6}N_{2}	cinnoline	253-66-7
C_{8}H_{6}N_{2}	phthalazine	253-52-1
C_{8}H_{6}N_{2}	quinazo	
C_{8}H_{6}N_{2}	quinoxaline	91-19-0
C_{8}H_{6}N_{2}O	phenylfurazan	10349-06-1
C_{8}H_{6}N_{2}O_{2}	quindoxin	2423-66-7
C_{8}H_{6}N_{4}O_{8}	alloxantin	76-24-4
C_{8}H_{6}O	benzocyclobutenone	3469-06-5
C_{8}H_{6}O	benzofuran	271-89-6
C_{8}H_{6}O	ethynyloxybenzene	4279-76-9
C_{8}H_{6}O	phenyl ketene	3496-32-0
C_{8}H_{6}O_{2}	isophthalaldehyde	626-19-7
C_{8}H_{6}O_{2}	phenylglyoxal	1074-12-0
C_{8}H_{6}O_{3}	benzoylformic acid	611-73-4
C_{8}H_{6}O_{3}	piperonal	120-57-0
C_{8}H_{7}Br	bromocubane	59346-69-9
C_{8}H_{7}Br	4-Bromophenylacetic acid	1878-68-8
C_{8}H_{7}ClO	benzeneacetyl chloride	103-80-0
C_{8}H_{7}ClO_{2}	benzyl chloroformate	501-53-1
C_{8}H_{7}F_{2}NO	difluoroacetanilide	404-17-1
C_{8}H_{7}F_{7}O_{3}	ethyl heptafluorobutanoylacetate	336-62-9
C_{8}H_{7}I	iodocubane	74725-77-2
C_{8}H_{7}IO_{2}	methyl 4-iodobenzoate	619-44-3
C_{8}H_{7}N	benzeneacetonitrile	140-29-4
C_{8}H_{7}N	indole	120-72-9
C_{8}H_{7}N	indolizine	274-40-8
C_{8}H_{7}NO	benzyl isocyanate	3173-56-6
C_{8}H_{7}NO_{3}	oxanilic acid	500-72-1
C_{8}H_{7}NO_{3}	phthaldehydic acid oxime	6383-59-1
C_{8}H_{7}NS	thiocyanic acid benzyl ester	3012-37-1
C_{8}H_{7}N_{3}O_{5}	furazolidone	67-45-8
C_{8}H_{8}	cubane	277-10-1
C_{8}H_{8}	heptafulvene	539-79-7
C_{8}H_{8}	styrene	100-42-5
C_{8}H_{8}	cyclooctatetraene	629-20-9
C_{8}H_{8}BrCl_{2}O_{3}PS	bromophos	2104-96-3
C_{8}H_{8}Cl_{2}IO_{3}PS	iodofenphos	18181-70-9
C_{8}H_{8}Cl_{3}O_{3}PS	O,O-Dimethyl O-(2,4,5-trichlorophenyl) phosphorothioate	299-84-3
C_{8}H_{8}Cl_{3}N_{3}O_{4}S_{2}	trichlormethiazide	133-67-5
C_{8}H_{8}F_{5}NSi	aminodimethylpentafluorophenylsilane	55804-98-3
C_{8}H_{8}HgO_{2}	phenyl mercurie acetate	62-38-4
C_{8}H_{8}N_{2}O_{2}	isonitrosoacetanilide	1769-41-1
C_{8}H_{8}N_{2}O_{2}	isophthalamide	1740-57-4
C_{8}H_{8}N_{2}O_{2}	terephthalamide	3010-82-0
C_{8}H_{8}N_{4}	hydralazine	86-54-4
C_{8}H_{8}N_{6}O_{6}	ammonium purpurate	3051-09-0
C_{8}H_{8}O	acetophenone	98-86-2
C_{8}H_{8}O	benzeneacetaldehyde	122-78-1
C_{8}H_{8}O	phthalan	496-14-0
C_{8}H_{8}O	vinylphenyl ether	766-94-9
C_{8}H_{8}O_{2}	benzeneacetic acid	103-82-2
C_{8}H_{8}O_{3}	hydroxytoluic acid	83-40-9
C_{8}H_{8}O_{3}	resorcinol monoacetate	102-29-4
C_{8}H_{8}O_{3}	vanillin	121-33-5
C_{8}H_{8}O_{3}	o-vanillin	148-53-8
C_{8}H_{8}O_{4}	vanillic acid	121-34-6
C_{8}H_{8}O_{4}	dehydroacetic acid	520-45-6
C_{8}H_{8}S_{2}	benzodithiene	6247-55-8
C_{8}H_{8}S_{4}	dimethyltetrathiafulvalene	62024-60-6
C_{8}H_{9}ClNO_{5}PS	chlorothion	500-28-7
C_{8}H_{9}ClO	benzyl chloromethyl ether	3587-60-8
C_{8}H_{9}ClO	chloroxylenol	88-04-0
C_{8}H_{9}Cl_{3}Si	phenethyltrichlorosilane	940-41-0
C_{8}H_{9}NO	benzeneacetamide	103-81-1
C_{8}H_{9}NO_{2}	acetaminophen	103-90-2
C_{8}H_{9}NO_{2}	metacetamol	621-42-1
C_{8}H_{9}NO_{2}	piperonylamine	2620-50-0
C_{8}H_{9}O_{3}PS	salithion	3811-49-2
C_{8}H_{10}	cyclooctatriene	29759-77-1
C_{8}H_{10}	dimethylbenzene	1330-20-7
C_{8}H_{10}	ethylbenzene	100-41-4
C_{8}H_{10}ClNO_{2}	placidyl carbamate	74283-25-3
C_{8}H_{10}N_{2}O_{4}S	asulam	3337-71-1
C_{8}H_{10}N_{2}S	ethionamide	536-33-4
C_{8}H_{10}N_{4}O_{2}	caffeine	58-08-2
C_{8}H_{10}N_{4}O_{2}	terephthalic dihydrazide	136-64-1
C_{8}H_{10}O	benzeneethanol	60-12-8
C_{8}H_{10}O	dimethylphenol	1300-71-6
C_{8}H_{10}OS	ethylphenylsulfoxide	4170-80-3
C_{8}H_{10}O_{2}	dicyclopropylethanedione	15940-88-2
C_{8}H_{10}O_{2}	nortricyclyl formate	21892-95-5
C_{8}H_{10}O_{2}	tyrosol	501-94-0
C_{8}H_{10}O_{3}	methacrylic anhydride	760-93-0
C_{8}H_{10}O_{3}S	ethyl benzenesulfonate	515-46-8
C_{8}H_{10}O_{4}	diallyl oxalate	615-99-6
C_{8}H_{10}O_{4}	diethylacetylene dicarboxylate	762-21-0
C_{8}H_{10}O_{4}	ethylene diacrylate	2274-11-5
C_{8}H_{10}Pd	cyclopentadienyl allyl palladium	1271-03-0
C_{8}H_{10}S	benzyl methyl sulfide	766-92-7
C_{8}H_{10}S	phenylethylthiol	4410-99-5
C_{8}H_{10}S_{2}	benzyl methyl disulfide	699-10-5
C_{8}H_{10}Se	ethylselenobenzene	17774-38-8
C_{8}H_{11}F_{3}O_{2}	cyclohexyl trifluoroacetate	1549-45-7
C_{8}H_{11}N	benzeneethanamine	64-04-0
C_{8}H_{11}N	collidine	29611-84-5
C_{8}H_{11}NO	metyridine	114-91-0
C_{8}H_{11}NO	phenylethanolamine	7568-93-6
C_{8}H_{11}NO_{2}	dopamine	51-61-6
C_{8}H_{11}NO_{8}	iminodisuccinic acid	131669-35-7
C_{8}H_{11}O_{2}P	dimethyl phenylphosphonite	2946-61-4
C_{8}H_{11}P	dimethylphenylphosphine	672-66-2
C_{8}H_{12}	bicyclobutylidine	6708-14-1
C_{8}H_{12}	cyclohexylacetylene	931-48-6
C_{8}H_{12}	cyclooctyne	1781-78-8
C_{8}H_{12}ClO	allidochlor	93-71-0
C_{8}H_{12}Cr_{2}O_{8}	tetraacetato dichromium	15020-15-2
C_{8}H_{12}NO_{5}PS_{2}	cythioate	115-93-5
C_{8}H_{12}N_{2}	betahistine	5638-76-6
C_{8}H_{12}N_{2}	isobutyl pyrazine	29460-92-2
C_{8}H_{12}N_{2}	mebenazine	65-64-5
C_{8}H_{12}N_{2}	octanedinitrile	629-40-3
C_{8}H_{12}N_{2}	phenelzine	51-71-8
C_{8}H_{12}N_{2}	tetramethyl butanedinitrile	3333-52-6
C_{8}H_{12}N_{2}O_{2}	pyridoxamine	85-87-0
C_{8}H_{12}N_{2}O_{2}S	phenethylsulfamide	710-15-6
C_{8}H_{12}N_{2}O_{3}	barbital	57-44-3
C_{8}H_{12}N_{2}O_{10}	diethyltartrate dinitrate	13454-52-9
C_{8}H_{12}N_{6}	terephthalic bisamidrazone	19173-40-1
C_{8}H_{12}O	cyclobutyl ethynyl methyl carbinol	515-81-1
C_{8}H_{12}O	vinyl cyclohexene monoxide	106-86-5
C_{8}H_{12}OS	furfuryl isopropyl sulfide	1883-78-9
C_{8}H_{12}O_{2}	allyl tiglate	7493-71-2
C_{8}H_{12}O_{2}	dimedone	126-81-8
C_{8}H_{12}O_{2}	octynoic acid	5663-96-7
C_{8}H_{12}O_{4}	ethyl diacetylacetate	603-69-0
C_{8}H_{12}O_{8}W_{2}	ditungsten tetraacetate	48169-70-6
C_{8}H_{13}ClO	cyclopentylpropionyl chloride	104-97-2
C_{8}H_{13}Cl_{3}O_{2}	hexyl trichloroacetate	37587-86-3
C_{8}H_{13}N	cycloheptyl cyanide	32730-85-1
C_{8}H_{13}NO_{2}	bemegride	64-65-3
C_{8}H_{13}NO_{2}	heliotridine	520-63-8
C_{8}H_{13}NO_{2}	retronecine	480-85-3
C_{8}H_{13}NO_{3}	diethadione	702-54-5
C_{8}H_{13}NO_{5}	diethyl formamidomalonate	6326-44-9
C_{8}H_{13}NS	cyclohexanemethyl isothiocyanate	52395-66-1
C_{8}H_{13}N_{2}O_{3}PS	thionazin	297-97-2
C_{8}H_{14}	cyclooctene	931-88-4
C_{8}H_{14}	methyl ethyl cyclopentene	19780-56-4
C_{8}H_{14}	methylenecycloheptane	2505-03-5
C_{8}H_{14}ClN_{5}	atrazine	1912-24-9
C_{8}H_{14}Cl_{2}O_{2}	hexyl dichloroacetate	37079-04-2
C_{8}H_{14}Cl_{3}O_{5}P	butonate	126-22-7
C_{8}H_{14}N_{2}	cyclohexylaminoacetonitrile	1074-58-4
C_{8}H_{14}N_{2}	hexamethyleneiminoacetonitrile	54714-50-0
C_{8}H_{14}N_{4}OS	metribuzin	21087-64-9
C_{8}H_{14}N_{4}O_{5}	glycylglycylglycylglycine	637-84-3
C_{8}H_{14}O	cyclooctanone	502-49-8
C_{8}H_{14}O	dimethallyl ether	628-56-8
C_{8}H_{14}O	vinylcyclohexyl ether	2182-55-0
C_{8}H_{14}O_{2}	butyl methacrylate	97-88-1
C_{8}H_{14}O_{2}	cycloheptanecarboxylic acid	1460-16-8
C_{8}H_{14}O_{2}	cyclohexaneacetic acid	5292-21-7
C_{8}H_{14}O_{2}	cyclopentanepropanoic acid	140-77-2
C_{8}H_{14}O_{2}	ethylene glycol diallyl ether	7529-27-3
C_{8}H_{14}O_{2}	isopropyl tiglate	1733-25-1
C_{8}H_{14}O_{2}	propyl angelate	53082-57-8
C_{8}H_{14}O_{2}	propyl tiglate	61692-83-9
C_{8}H_{14}O_{2}S_{2}	lipoic acid	62-46-4
C_{8}H_{14}O_{3}	carbonic acid cyclohexylmethyl ester	25066-36-8
C_{8}H_{14}O_{3}	ethyl 3-oxohexanoate	3249-68-1
C_{8}H_{14}O_{4}	diethyl succinate	123-25-1
C_{8}H_{14}O_{4}	diisopropyl oxalate	615-81-6
C_{8}H_{14}O_{4}	ethylene glycol diglycidyl ether	2224-15-9
C_{8}H_{14}O_{4}	suberic acid	505-48-6
C_{8}H_{14}O_{4}	sym. dimethyladipic acid	26979-55-5
C_{8}H_{14}O_{4}	tetramethylbutanedioic acid	630-51-3
C_{8}H_{14}O_{5}	diethyl malate	626-11-9
C_{8}H_{14}O_{6}	diethyl tartrate	87-91-2
C_{8}H_{14}O_{6}	triethylene glycol diformate	5451-65-0
C_{8}H_{15}Br	cyclooctyl bromide	1556-09-8
C_{8}H_{15}BrO_{2}	hexyl bromoacetate	13048-32-3
C_{8}H_{15}ClO	octanoyl chloride	111-64-8
C_{8}H_{15}ClO_{2}	hexyl chloroacetate	5927-57-1
C_{8}H_{15}CoNO_{3}P	triethylphosphine cobalt dicarbonyl nitrosyl	21485-16-5
C_{8}H_{15}N	octahydroindolizine	13618-93-4
C_{8}H_{15}N	octanenitrile	124-12-9
C_{8}H_{15}N	tropane	529-17-9
C_{8}H_{15}NO	hygrine	496-49-1
C_{8}H_{15}NO	tropine	120-29-6
C_{8}H_{15}NO_{2}	cyclopentanecarboxylic acid	1664-35-3
C_{8}H_{15}NO_{2}	dimethylaminoethyl methacrylate	2867-47-2
C_{8}H_{15}NO_{2}	ethyl pipecolinate	15862-72-3
C_{8}H_{15}NO_{2}	oxanamide	126-93-2
C_{8}H_{15}NO_{2}	platynecine	520-62-7
C_{8}H_{15}O_{2}Tl	thallium octanoate	18993-50-5
C_{8}H_{16}	cyclooctane	292-64-8
C_{8}H_{16}FO_{2}P	cyclohexyl ethylphosphonofluoridate	7284-84-6
C_{8}H_{16}NO_{3}P	diisopropyl cyanomethylphosphonate	21658-95-7
C_{8}H_{16}NO_{5}P	dicrotophos	141-66-2
C_{8}H_{16}N_{2}O_{2}S_{2}	morpholine disulfide	103-34-4
C_{8}H_{16}O	cycloheptanemethanol	4448-75-3
C_{8}H_{16}O	cyclohexaneethanol	4442-79-9
C_{8}H_{16}O	cyclooctyl alcohol	696-71-9
C_{8}H_{16}O	diisobutylene oxide	63919-00-6
C_{8}H_{16}O	methylheptenol	1335-09-7
C_{8}H_{16}O	octanal	124-13-0
C_{8}H_{16}O_{2}	amyl propionate	624-54-4
C_{8}H_{16}O_{2}	butyl butyrate	109-21-7
C_{8}H_{16}O_{2}	ethyl isocaproate	25415-67-2
C_{8}H_{16}O_{2}	hexyl ethanoate	142-92-7
C_{8}H_{16}O_{2}	isoamyl propionate	105-68-0
C_{8}H_{16}O_{2}	isohexyl acetate	628-95-5
C_{8}H_{16}O_{2}	isopropyl pivalate	5129-36-2
C_{8}H_{16}O_{2}	octanoic acid	124-07-2
C_{8}H_{16}O_{2}	propyl isovalerate	557-00-6
C_{8}H_{16}O_{2}	valproic acid	99-66-1
C_{8}H_{17}ClO_{4}	tetraethylene glycol monochlorohydrine	5197-66-0
C_{8}H_{17}Cl_{3}Si	octyltrichlorosilane	5283-66-9
C_{8}H_{17}N	cycloheptanemethylamine	4448-77-5
C_{8}H_{17}N	cyclooctanamine	5452-37-9
C_{8}H_{17}NO	octanaloxime	929-55-5
C_{8}H_{17}NO	octanamide	629-01-6
C_{8}H_{17}NO	valnoctamide	4171-13-5
C_{8}H_{17}NO_{3}Si	ethylsilatrane	2097-16-7
C_{8}H_{17}NO_{4}Si	ethoxysilatrane	3463-21-6
C_{8}H_{18}	octane	111-65-9
C_{8}H_{18}AsO_{2}	dibutylarsinic acid	2850-61-5
C_{8}H_{18}Cl_{2}Si	dibutyldichlorosilane	3449-28-3
C_{8}H_{18}FO_{2}P	heptyl methylphosphonofluoridate	162085-82-7
C_{8}H_{18}FO_{2}P	hexyl ethylphosphonofluoridate	135445-19-1
C_{8}H_{18}FO_{2}P	pinacolyl ethylphosphonofluoridate	97931-20-9
C_{8}H_{18}N_{2}	diisobutyl diazene	3896-19-3
C_{8}H_{18}N_{2}	isobutyraldehyde isobutylhydrazone	21041-71-4
C_{8}H_{18}O	isobutyl ether	628-55-7
C_{8}H_{18}O	isooctanol	26952-21-6
C_{8}H_{18}O	isopropyl pentyl ether	5756-37-6
C_{8}H_{18}O	pentyl propyl ether	18641-82-2
C_{8}H_{18}O_{2}	hexanal dimethyl acetal	1599-47-9
C_{8}H_{18}O_{2}S	diisobutyl sulfone	10495-45-1
C_{8}H_{18}O_{2}Si	allyldiethoxymethylsilane	18388-45-9
C_{8}H_{18}O_{2}Sn	triethyl tin acetate	1907-13-7
C_{8}H_{18}O_{3}	ethoxyacetaldehyde diethylacetal	4819-77-6
C_{8}H_{18}S	diisobutyl sulfide	592-65-4
C_{8}H_{19}Al	diisobutylaluminum hydride	1191-15-7
C_{8}H_{19}ClSi	dimethylthexylsilyl chloride	67373-56-2
C_{8}H_{19}N	ethylmethylisoamylamine	500003-01-0
C_{8}H_{19}N	isoamylpropylamine	78579-58-5
C_{8}H_{19}N	octodrine	543-82-8
C_{8}H_{19}N	tertiary octyl amine	60996-53-4
C_{8}H_{19}NO	heptaminol	372-66-7
C_{8}H_{19}O_{2}PS_{2}	ethoprophos	13194-48-4
C_{8}H_{19}O_{2}PS_{3}	disulfoton	298-04-4
C_{8}H_{19}O_{3}P	dibutyl hydrogen phosphite	1809-19-4
C_{8}H_{19}O_{3}P	diisobutylphosphite	1189-24-8
C_{8}H_{19}O_{3}P	methyl pinacolyl methylphosphonate	7040-59-7
C_{8}H_{19}O_{3}PS_{3}	oxydisulfoton	2497-07-6
C_{8}H_{19}O_{4}PS_{3}	disulfoton sulfone	2497-06-5
C_{8}H_{20}BrN	tetraethylammonium bromide	71-91-0
C_{8}H_{20}Br_{4}FeN	tetraethylammonium tetrabromoferrate	21279-19-6
C_{8}H_{20}Cl_{4}FeN	tetraethylammonium tetrachloroferrate	14240-75-6
C_{8}H_{20}IN	tetraethylammonium iodide	68-05-3
C_{8}H_{20}N_{2}	tetraethylhydrazine	4267-00-9
C_{8}H_{20}N_{2}OS	tetraethyl sulfurous diamide	33641-61-1
C_{8}H_{20}N_{2}O_{2}S	tetraethyl sulfamide	2832-49-7
C_{8}H_{20}O_{2}Si	diethoxydiethylsilane	5021-93-2
C_{8}H_{20}O_{3}Si	ethyltriethoxysilane	78-07-9
C_{8}H_{20}O_{5}P_{2}S_{2}	sulfotep	3689-24-5
C_{8}H_{20}P_{2}	tetraethyldiphosphine	3040-63-9
C_{8}H_{20}Pb	tetraethyllead	78-00-2
C_{8}H_{20}Sb_{2}	tetraethyldistibine	4669-92-5
C_{8}H_{20}TeZn	diethylzinc diethyltellurim complex	132851-15-1
C_{8}H_{23}N_{5}	tetraethylenepentamine	112-57-2
C_{8}H_{24}O_{2}Si_{3}	octamethyltrisiloxane	107-51-7
C_{8}N_{6}	hexacyanoethane	4383-67-9
C_{8}(NO_{2})_{8}	octanitrocubane	99393-63-2

== See also ==
- Carbon number
- List of compounds with carbon number 7
- List of compounds with carbon number 9
