= Tetraethylammonium cyanide =

Identifiers
CAS Number	13435-20-6
3D model (JSmol)	Interactive image
ChemSpider	2283045
ECHA InfoCard	100.033.228
EC Number	236-566-2
PubChem CID	3014735
CompTox Dashboard (EPA)	DTXSID70158668
- InChI: InChI=1S/C8H20N.CN/c1-5-9(6-2,7-3)8-4;1-2/h5-8H2,1-4H3;/q+1;-1 Key: PCZOZSATUTWXIC-UHFFFAOYSA-N
- SMILES: CC[N+](CC)(CC)CC.[C-]#N

Properties
Chemical formula	[(CH_{3}CH_{2})_{4}N]CN
Molar mass	156.273 g·mol^{−1}
Appearance	white solid
Melting point	254 °C (489 °F; 527 K)

Hazards
- GHS labelling
Pictograms	(GHS06: Toxic) (GHS09: Environmental hazard)
Signal word	Danger
Hazard statements	H300, H310, H330, H410
Precautionary statements	P260, P262, P264, P270, P271, P273, P280, P284, P301+P310, P302+P350, P304+P340, P310, P320, P321, P330, P361, P363, P391, P403+P233, P405, P501

Related compounds
Other anions	Tetraethylammonium chloride; Tetraethylammonium bromide; Tetraethylammonium iodide
Other cations	Tetramethylammonium cyanide; Ammonium cyanide; Guanidinium cyanide
- Except where otherwise noted, data are given for materials in their standard state (at 25 °C [77 °F], 100 kPa). Infobox references

Tetraethylammonium cyanide is the organic compound with the formula [(CH_{3}CH_{2})_{4}N]CN. It is a "quat salt" of hydrogen cyanide. It consists of tetraethylammonium cations [(CH_{3}CH_{2})_{4}N]^{+} and cyanide anions CN^{−}. This salt is a colorless, deliquescent solid that is soluble in polar organic media. It is used in the synthesis of cyanometallates.

Tetraethylammonium cyanide is prepared by ion exchange from tetraethylammonium bromide. The corresponding tetraphenylarsonium salt is prepared similarly.

== Safety ==
The salt is highly toxic as it contains cyanide ions.

== See also ==
- Tetramethylammonium chloride
