= Tetrachloronickelate =

Class of chemical compounds

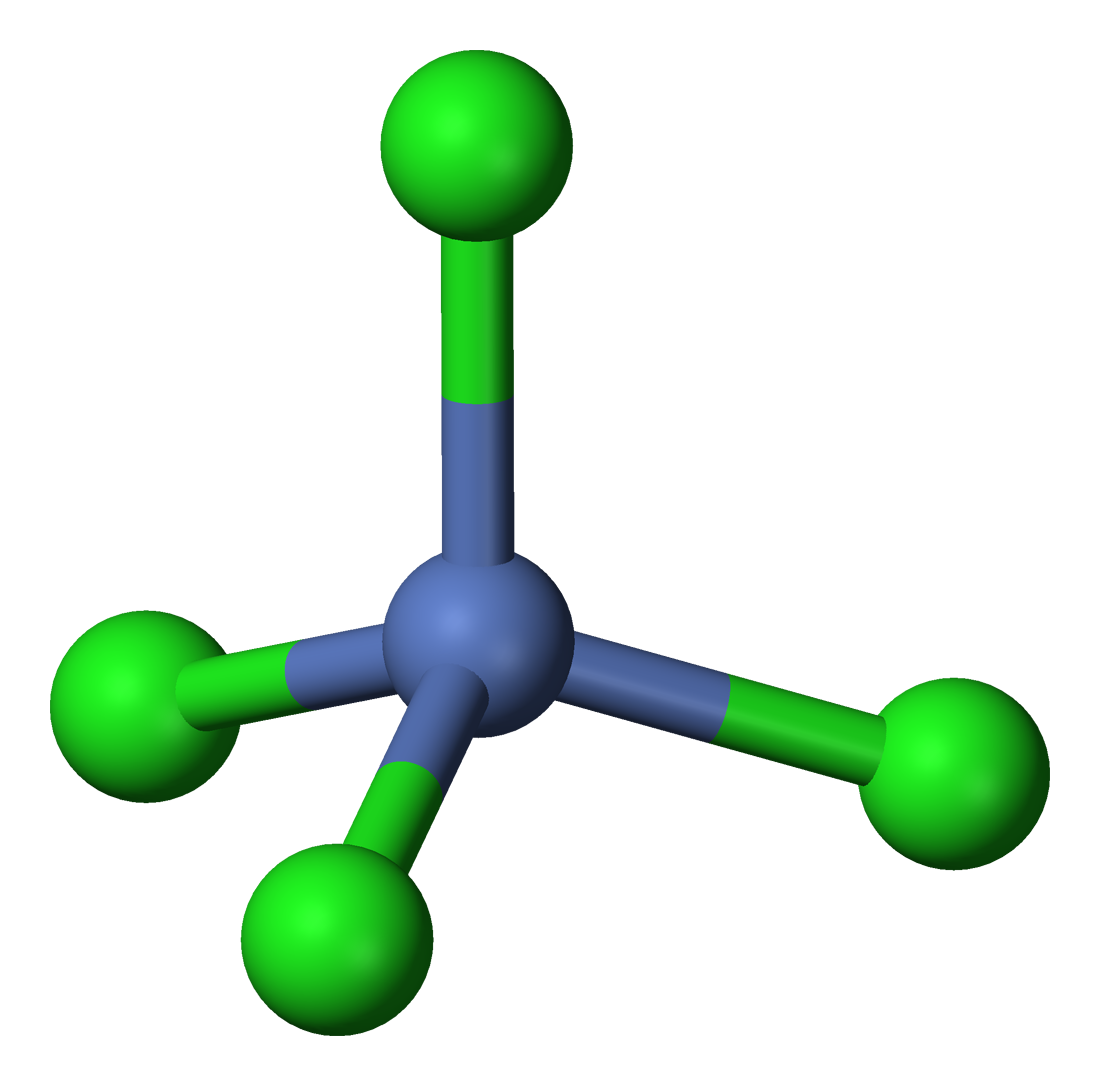
A tetrahedral tetrachloronickelate complex ion

Tetrachloronickelate is the metal complex with the formula [NiCl_{4}]^{2−}. Salts of the complex are available with a variety of cations, but a common one is tetraethylammonium.

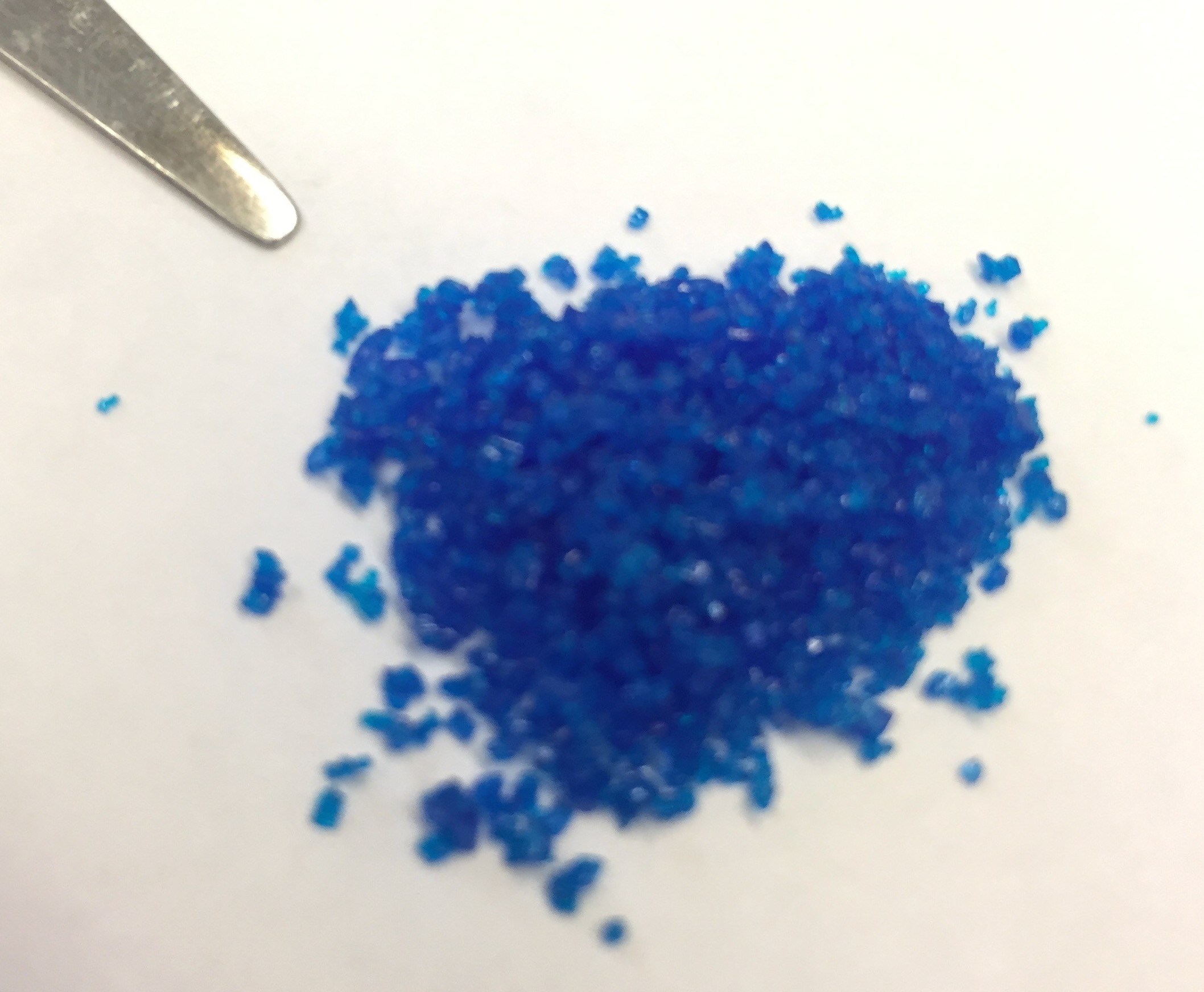
Sample of (Et_{4}N)_{2}NiCl_{4}

When concentrated lithium chloride and nickel chloride solution in water is mixed, only a pentaaquachloro complex is formed: [Ni(H_{2}O)_{5}Cl]^{+}. However in other organic solvents, or molten salts the tetrachloronickelate ion can form. Nickel can be separated from such a solution in water or methanol, by partitioning it into a cyclohexane solution of amines.

Organic ammonium salts of the type (R_{3}NH)_{2}[NiCl_{4}] are often thermochromic (R = Me, Et, Pr). Near room temperature, these salts are yellow, but these solids become blue when heated to near 70 °C. The bright blue color is characteristic of tetrahedral [NiCl_{4}]^{2−}, the high intensity being a consequence of the Laporte selection rule. The yellow color results from a polymer consisting of octahedral Ni centers. The corresponding tetrabromonickelates are also thermochromic with a lower transition temperatures.

== History ==
The blue colour due to the tetrachloronickelate ion was first observed in 1944 when Remy and Meyer melted caesium chloride and caesium nickel trichloride together.

== Compounds ==
formula	name	structure	Remarks	references
Cs_{2}NiCl_{4}	caesium tetrachloronickelate		blue, stable only over 70°	
[(CH_{3})_{4}N]_{2}NiCl_{4}	Tetramethylammonium tetrachloronickelate		dark blue	
[(C_{2}H_{5})_{4}N]_{2}NiCl_{4}	Tetraethylammonium tetrachloronickelate			
[H_{2}NN(CH_{3})_{3}]_{2}NiCl_{4}	1,1,1-trimethylhydrazinium tetrachloronickelate		blue, only stable over 145 °C, under this is yellow	
[(C_{6}H_{5})_{4}As]_{2}NiCl_{4}	bis-tetraphenylarsonium tetrachloronickelate		blue, melts at 199.5°C	
[(C_{6}H_{5})_{3}CH_{3}As]_{2}NiCl_{4}	bis-triphenylmethylarsonium tetrachloronickelate		blue	
[C_{2}mim]_{2}NiCl_{4}	1-ethyl-3-methylimidazolium tetrachloronickelate(II)	tetragonal I4_{1}/a a=14.112 c=19.436 V=3871.1 Z=8 density=1.47 MW=422.84	melts at 92°	
[C_{4}mim]_{2}NiCl_{4}	1-butyl-3-methylimidazolium tetrachloronickelate(II)	dark blue, melts at 56°C		
[C_{5}mim]_{2}NiCl_{4}	1-pentyl-3-methylimidazolium tetrachloronickelate(II)	dark blue liquid		
[C_{6}mim]_{2}NiCl_{4}	1-hexyl-3-methylimidazolium tetrachloronickelate(II)	dark blue liquid		
[C_{7}mim]_{2}NiCl_{4}	1-heptyl-3-methylimidazolium tetrachloronickelate(II)	dark blue liquid		
[C_{8}mim]_{2}NiCl_{4}	1-octyl-3-methylimidazolium tetrachloronickelate(II)	dark blue liquid		
[NH_{3}CH_{2}CH_{2}NH_{3}]NiCl_{4}	ethylenediammonium tetrachloronickelate(II)	perovskite layered, space group P2_{1}/c a=8.441, b=6.995, c=6.943, β=92.925 Z=2	brown, isostructural with Mn, Cu, Pd, and Cd compounds	

== Related substances ==
- tetrabromonickelates
