= C8H15NO2 =

The molecular formula C_{8}H_{15}NO_{2} (molar mass: 157.21 g/mol, exact mass: 157.1103 u) may refer to:

- Oxanamide (Quiactin)
- Tranexamic acid (TXA)
