= TEA chloride =

TEA chloride may refer to:

- Tetraethylammonium chloride
- Triethylammonium chloride, the hydrochloride salt of triethylamine
