= Tin(II) chloride =

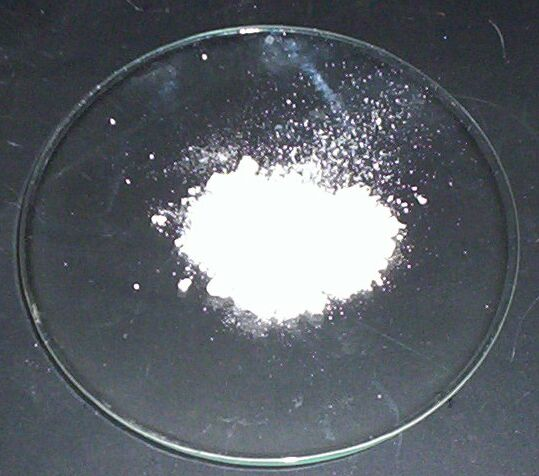
- Tin(II) chloride

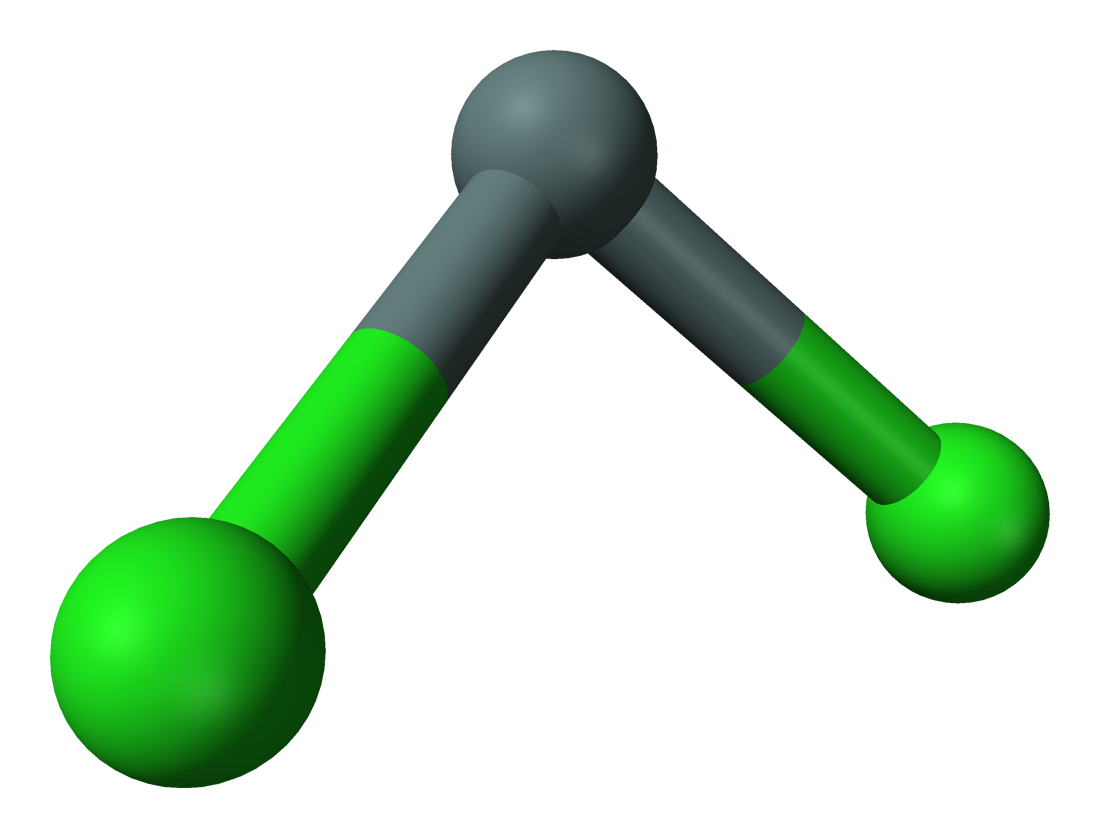
Ball-and-stick model (gas phase).
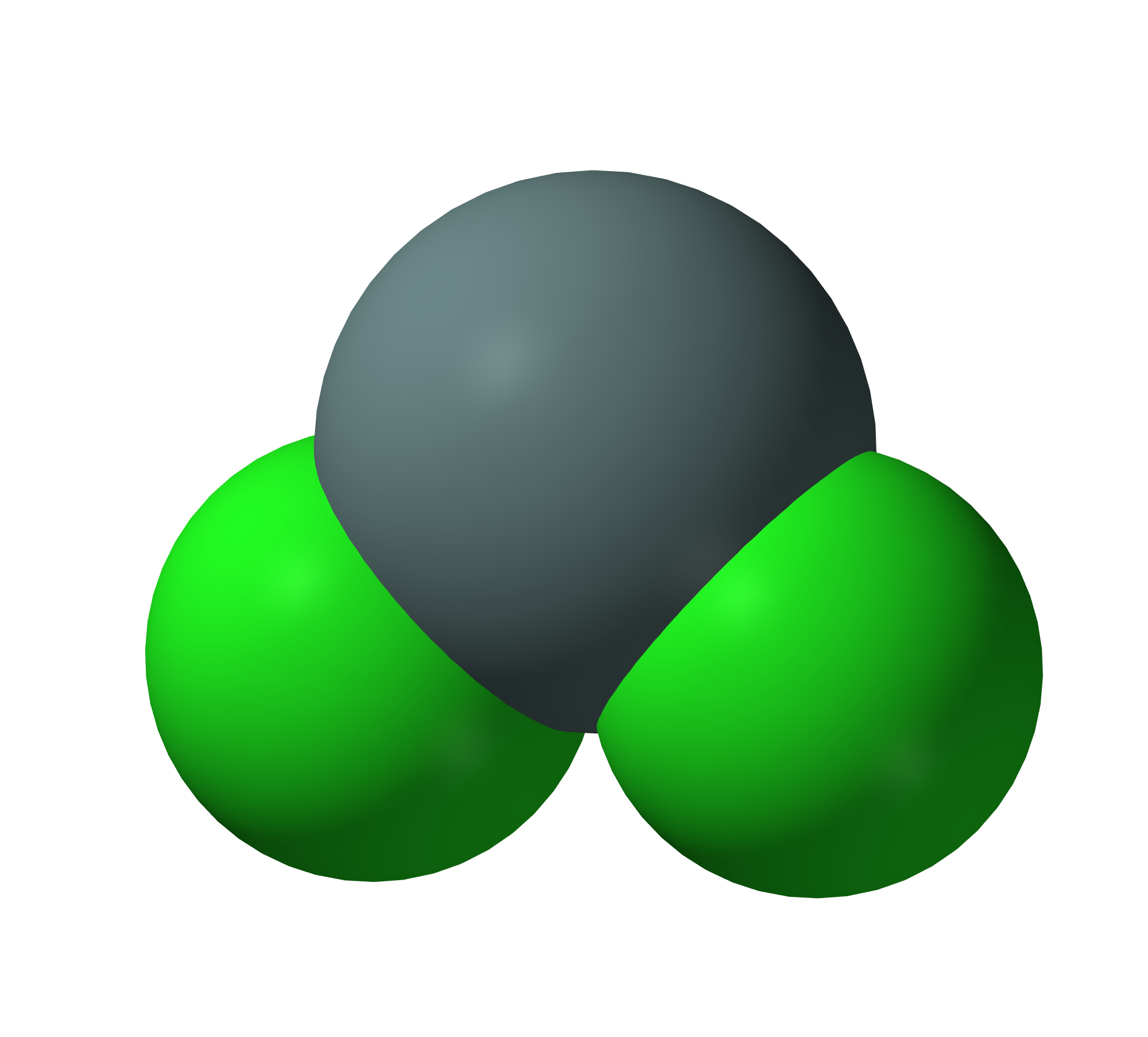
Space-filling model (gas phase).

Names
- IUPAC names Tin(II) chloride Tin dichloride
- Other names: Stannous chloride; Tin salt; Tin protochloride

Identifiers
| CAS Number | 7772-99-8; 10025-69-1 (dihydrate) |
| 3D model (JSmol) | Interactive image |
| ChEBI | CHEBI:78067 |
| ChemSpider | 22887 |
| DrugBank | DB11056 |
| ECHA InfoCard | 100.028.971 |
| EC Number | 231-868-0 |
| E number | E512 (acidity regulators, ...) |
| PubChem CID | 24479 |
| RTECS number | XP8700000 (anhydrous) XP8850000 (dihydrate) |
| UNII | R30H55TN67; 1BQV3749L5 (dihydrate) |
| UN number | 3260 |
| CompTox Dashboard (EPA) | DTXSID8021351 |
- InChI: InChI=1S/2ClH.Sn/h2*1H;/q;;+2/p-2 Key: AXZWODMDQAVCJE-UHFFFAOYSA-L; InChI=1/2ClH.Sn/h2*1H;/q;;+2/p-2 Key: AXZWODMDQAVCJE-NUQVWONBAJ
- SMILES: Cl[Sn]Cl

Properties
| Chemical formula | SnCl_{2} |
| Molar mass | 189.60 g/mol (anhydrous); 225.63 g/mol (dihydrate) |
| Appearance | White crystalline solid |
| Odor | odorless |
| Density | 3.95 g/cm^{3} (anhydrous); 2.71 g/cm^{3} (dihydrate) |
| Melting point | 247 °C (477 °F; 520 K) (anhydrous); 37.7 °C (dihydrate) |
| Boiling point | 623 °C (1,153 °F; 896 K) (decomposes) |
| Solubility in water | 83.9 g/100 ml (0 °C); Hydrolyses in hot water |
| Solubility | soluble in ethanol, acetone, ether, Tetrahydrofuran insoluble in xylene |
| Magnetic susceptibility (χ) | −69.0·10^{−6} cm^{3}/mol |

Structure
| Crystal structure | Layer structure (chains of SnCl_{3} groups) |
| Coordination geometry | Trigonal pyramidal (anhydrous); Dihydrate also three-coordinate |
| Molecular shape | Bent (gas phase) |

Thermochemistry
| Std enthalpy of formation (Δ_{f}H^{⦵}_{298}) | −325 kJ/mol |

Hazards
- Occupational safety and health (OHS/OSH)
| Main hazards | Irritant, dangerous for aquatic organisms |
- GHS labelling
| Pictograms | (GHS05: Corrosive) (GHS07: Exclamation mark) (GHS08: Health hazard) |
| Signal word | Danger |
| Hazard statements | H290, H302+H332, H314, H317, H335, H373, H412 |
| Precautionary statements | P260, P273, P280, P303+P361+P353, P304+P340+P312, P305+P351+P338+P310 |
| NFPA 704 (fire diamond) | 3 0 0 |
- Lethal dose or concentration (LD, LC)
| LD_{50} (median dose) | 700 mg/kg (rat, oral); 10,000 mg/kg (rabbit, oral); 250 mg/kg (mouse, oral) |
| Safety data sheet (SDS) | ICSC 0955 (anhydrous); ICSC 0738 (dihydrate) |

Related compounds
| Other anions | Tin(II) fluoride Tin(II) bromide Tin(II) iodide |
| Other cations | Germanium dichloride Tin(IV) chloride Lead(II) chloride |
- Except where otherwise noted, data are given for materials in their standard state (at 25 °C [77 °F], 100 kPa). verify (what is ?) Infobox references

Tin(II) chloride, also known as stannous chloride, is a white crystalline solid with the formula SnCl_{2}. It forms a stable dihydrate, but aqueous solutions tend to undergo hydrolysis, particularly if hot. SnCl_{2} is widely used as a reducing agent (in acid solution), and in electrolytic baths for tin-plating. Tin(II) chloride should not be confused with the other chloride of tin; tin(IV) chloride or stannic chloride (SnCl_{4}).

== Chemical structure ==
SnCl_{2} has a lone pair of electrons, such that the molecule in the gas phase is bent. In the solid state, crystalline SnCl_{2} forms chains linked via chloride bridges as shown. The dihydrate has three coordinates as well, with one water on the tin and another water on the first. The main part of the molecule stacks into double layers in the crystal lattice, with the "second" water sandwiched between the layers.

Structures of tin(II) chloride and related compounds

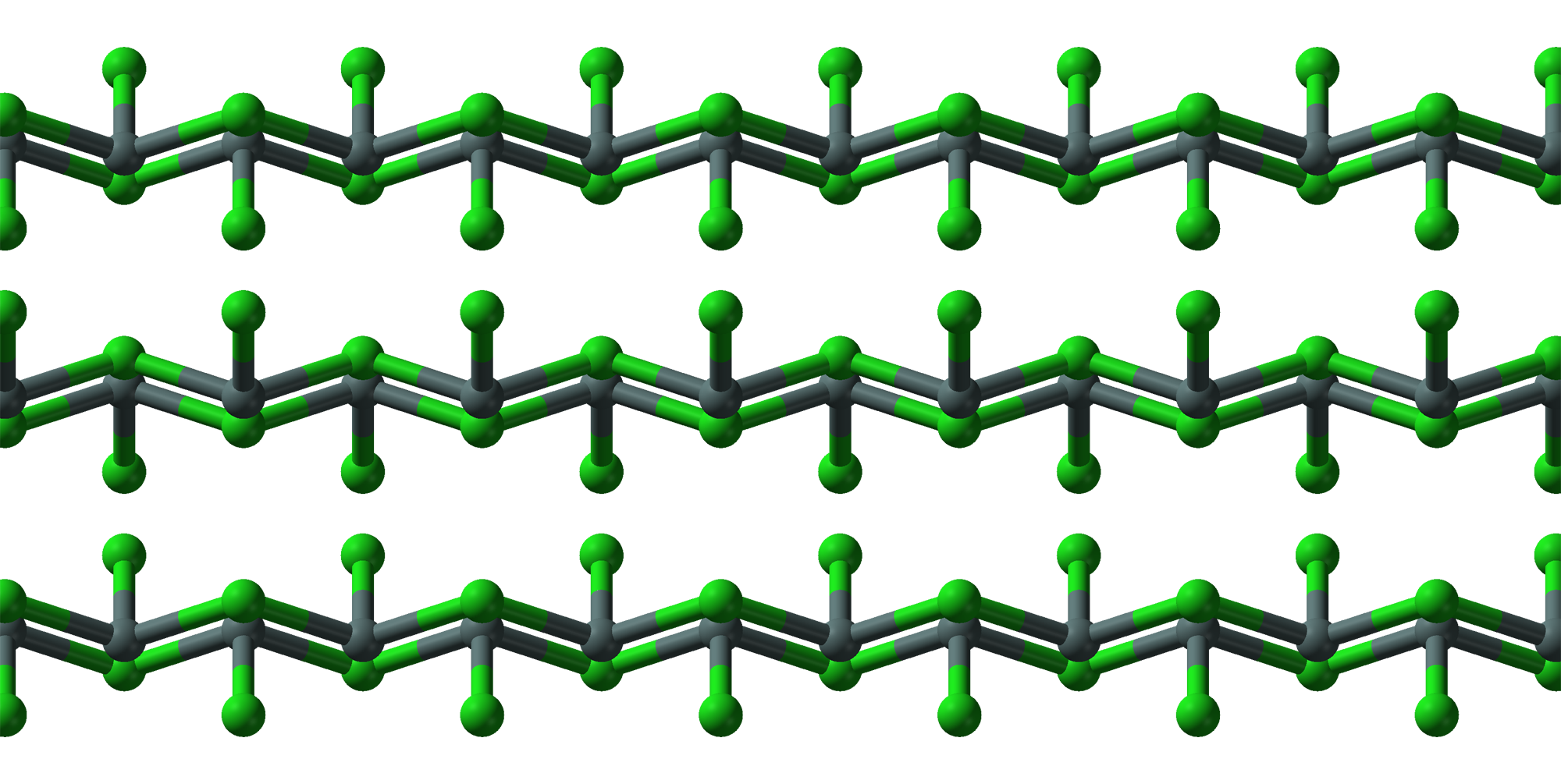
Ball-and-stick models of the crystal structure of SnCl_{2}

== Chemical properties ==
Tin(II) chloride dissolves in less than its own mass of water. Dilute solutions are subject to hydrolysis, yielding an insoluble basic salt:

SnCl_{2} + H_{2}O ⇌ Sn(OH)Cl + HCl

Hydrolysis is prevented in the presence of hydrochloric acid, typically of the same or greater molarity as the stannous chloride. Solutions of SnCl_{2} are also unstable towards oxidation by the air:

6 SnCl_{2} + O_{2} + 2 H_{2}O → 2 SnCl_{4} + 4 Sn(OH)Cl

Oxidation can be prevented by storing the solution over lumps of tin metal.

Tin(II) chloride acts as a reducing agent for silver and gold salts to the metal, and iron(III) salts to iron(II), for example:

SnCl_{2} (aq) + 2 FeCl_{3} (aq) → SnCl_{4} (aq) + 2 FeCl_{2} (aq)

It also reduces copper(II) to copper(I).

Solutions of tin(II) chloride can also serve simply as a source of Sn^{2+} ions, which can form other tin(II) compounds via precipitation reactions. For example, reaction with sodium sulfide produces the brown/black tin(II) sulfide:

SnCl_{2} (aq) + Na_{2}S (aq) → SnS (s) + 2 NaCl (aq)

If alkali is added to a solution of SnCl_{2}, a white precipitate of hydrated tin(II) oxide forms initially; this then dissolves in excess base to form a stannite salt such as sodium stannite:

SnCl_{2}(aq) + 2 NaOH (aq) → SnO·H_{2}O (s) + 2 NaCl (aq)
SnO·H_{2}O (s) + NaOH (aq) → NaSn(OH)_{3} (aq)

Anhydrous SnCl_{2} can be used to make a variety of tin(II) compounds in non-aqueous solvents. For example, the lithium salt of 4-methyl-2,6-di-tert-butylphenol reacts with SnCl_{2} in THF to give the yellow linear two-coordinate compound Sn(OAr)_{2} (Ar = aryl).

Tin(II) chloride also behaves as a weak Lewis acid, forming complexes with ligands such as chloride ion, for example:

SnCl_{2} + CsCl^{−} → SnCl^{−}_{3}

Like SnCl_{2}(H_{2}O), trichlorostannate (SnCl^{−}_{3}) ion is pyramidal. Such complexes have a full octet. The lone pair of electrons in such complexes is available for bonding. Therefore, SnCl^{−}_{3} itself can serve as a Lewis base or ligand:

SnCl_{2} + Fe(η^{5}-C_{5}H_{5})(CO)_{2}HgCl → Fe(η^{5}-C_{5}H_{5})(CO)_{2}SnCl_{3} + Hg

SnCl_{2} can be used to make a variety of related compounds containing metal-tin bonds. For example, the reaction with dicobalt octacarbonyl:

SnCl_{2} + Co_{2}(CO)_{8} → (CO)_{4}Co-(SnCl_{2})-Co(CO)_{4}

== Preparation ==
Anhydrous SnCl_{2} is prepared by the action of dry hydrogen chloride gas on tin metal. The dihydrate is made by a similar reaction, using hydrochloric acid:

Sn (s) + 2 HCl (aq) → SnCl_{2} (aq) + H_{2} (g)

The water then carefully evaporated from the acidic solution to produce crystals of SnCl_{2}·2H_{2}O. This dihydrate can be dehydrated to anhydration using acetic anhydride.

== Uses ==
A solution of tin(II) chloride containing a little hydrochloric acid is used for the tin-plating of steel, in order to make tin cans. An electric potential is applied, and tin metal is formed at the cathode via electrolysis.

Tin(II) chloride is used as a mordant in textile dyeing because it gives brighter colours with some dyes e.g. cochineal. This mordant has also been used alone to increase the weight of silk.

In recent years, an increasing number of tooth paste brands have been adding Tin(II) chloride as protection against enamel erosion to their formula, e. g. Oral-B or Elmex.

It is used as a catalyst in the production of the plastic polylactic acid (PLA).

It also finds a use as a catalyst between acetone and hydrogen peroxide to form the tetrameric form of acetone peroxide.

Tin(II) chloride also finds wide use as a reducing agent. This is seen in its use for silvering mirrors, where silver metal is deposited on the glass:

Sn^{2+} (aq) + 2 Ag^{+} → Sn^{4+} (aq) + 2 Ag (s)

A related reduction was traditionally used as an analytical test for Hg^{2+} (aq). For example, if SnCl_{2} is added dropwise into a solution of mercury(II) chloride, a white precipitate of mercury(I) chloride is first formed; as more SnCl_{2} is added this turns black as metallic mercury is formed.

Stannous chloride is also used by many precious metals refining hobbyists and professionals to test for the presence of gold salts. When SnCl_{2} comes into contact with gold compounds, particularly chloroaurate salts, it forms a bright purple colloid known as purple of Cassius. A similar reaction occurs with platinum and palladium salts, becoming green and brown respectively.

When mercury is analyzed using atomic absorption spectroscopy, a cold vapor method must be used, and tin (II) chloride is typically used as the reductant.

=== Organic chemistry ===
In organic chemistry, SnCl_{2} is used in the Stephen reduction, whereby a nitrile is reduced (via an imidoyl chloride salt) to an imine which is easily hydrolysed to an aldehyde.

The reaction usually works best with aromatic nitriles Aryl-CN. A related reaction (called the Sonn-Müller method) starts with an amide, which is treated with PCl_{5} to form the imidoyl chloride salt.

The Stephen reduction

The Stephen reduction is less used today, because it has been mostly superseded by diisobutylaluminium hydride reduction.

Additionally, SnCl_{2} is used to selectively reduce aromatic nitro groups to anilines.

Aromatic nitro group reduction using SnCl_{2}

SnCl_{2} also reduces quinones to hydroquinones.

Stannous chloride is also added as a food additive with E number E512 to some canned and bottled foods, where it serves as a color-retention agent and antioxidant.

SnCl_{2} is used in radionuclide angiography to reduce the radioactive agent technetium-99m-pertechnetate to assist in binding to blood cells.

Molten SnCl_{2} can be oxidised to form highly crystalline SnO_{2} nanostructures.

A Stannous reduction is used in nuclear medicine bone scans to remove the negative charge from free pertechnetate when it is bound to MDP for radiopharmaceutical studies. Incomplete reduction due to insufficient tin or accidental insufflation of air leads to the formation of free pertechnetate, a finding which can be seen on bone scans due to its inappropriate uptake in the stomach.

Stannous Chloride is used for coating SnO_{2} Tin Oxide doped conductive iridescent coatings for low e glass.

== Notes ==
- N. N. Greenwood, A. Earnshaw, Chemistry of the Elements, 2nd ed., Butterworth-Heinemann, Oxford, UK, 1997.
- Handbook of Chemistry and Physics, 71st edition, CRC Press, Ann Arbor, Michigan, 1990.
- The Merck Index, 7th edition, Merck & Co, Rahway, New Jersey, USA, 1960.
- A. F. Wells, 'Structural Inorganic Chemistry, 5th ed., Oxford University Press, Oxford, UK, 1984.
- J. March, Advanced Organic Chemistry, 4th ed., p. 723, Wiley, New York, 1992.
