= Trichlorogermanate =

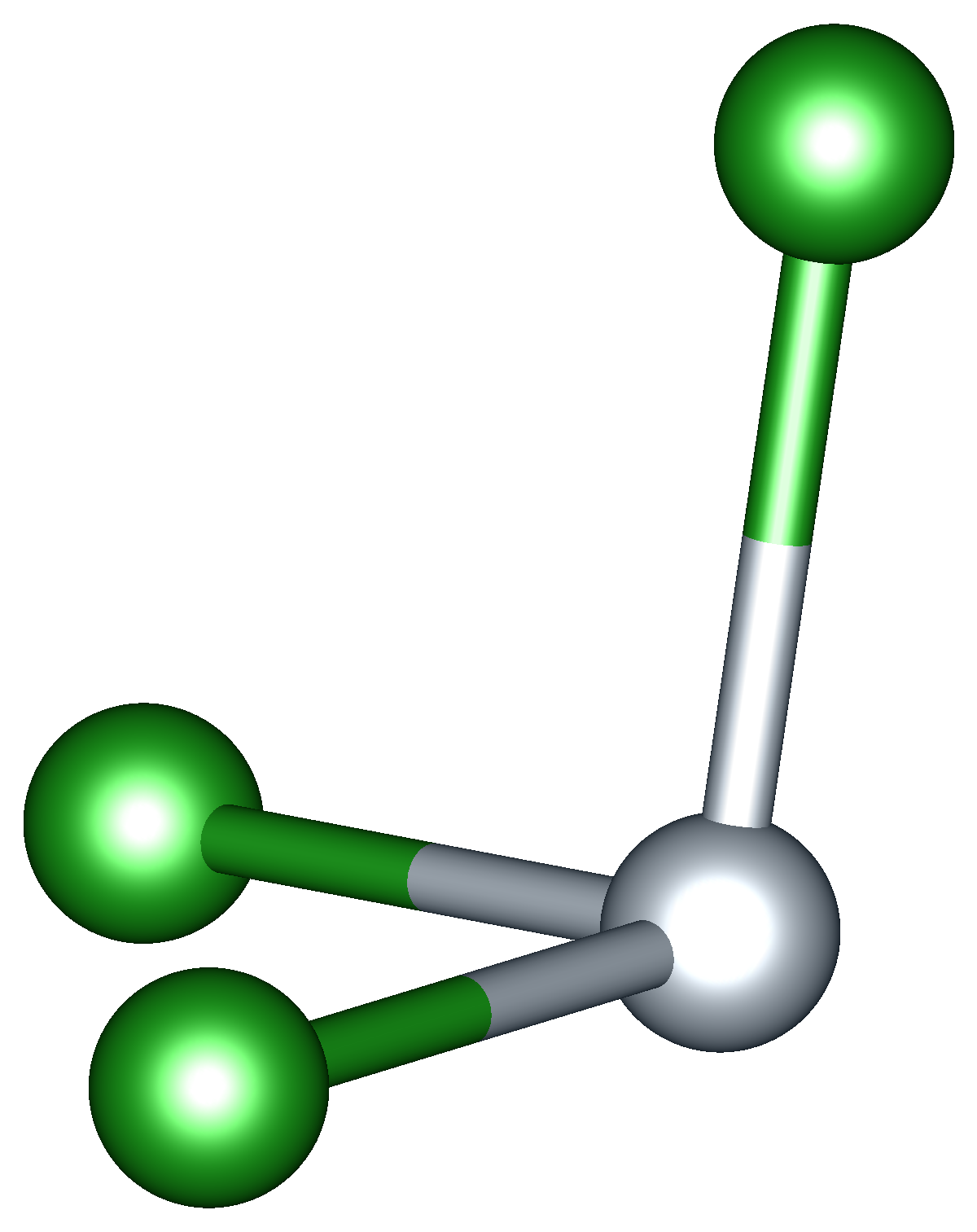

Identifiers
3D model (JSmol)	Interactive image
- InChI: InChI=1S/Cl3Ge/c1-4(2)3/q-1 Key: JSJSFKAKOSUZMG-UHFFFAOYSA-N
- SMILES: [Cl-][Ge+2]([Cl-])[Cl-]

Properties
Chemical formula	GeCl_{3}^{−}
- Except where otherwise noted, data are given for materials in their standard state (at 25 °C [77 °F], 100 kPa). Infobox references

Trichlorogermanate is the inorganic anion with the formula GeCl^{−}_{3}. It is the chloride adduct of germanium dichloride:

GeCl_{2} + Cl^{−} → GeCl^{−}_{3}

The anion can be isolated as a quaternary ammonium salt. The anion is similar to trichlorostannate (SnCl^{−}_{3}).

The anion is pyramidal according to X-ray crystallography with Cl-Ge-Cl angle of about 95° and Ge-Cl distance of 232 pm.
