= Tetrabromonickelate =

The tetrabromonickelate anion contains a doubly-charged nickel atom (Ni^{2+}) surrounded by four bromide ions in a tetrahedral arrangement. The formula is [NiBr_{4}]^{2−}.

The anion combines with cations to form a series of salts called tetrabromonickelates. Strongly-coordinating solvents will displace one or more of the bromido ligands from the complex. Solvents that can dissolve tetrabromonickelate include acetone, acetonitrile, methyl ethyl ketone, and nitromethane.

In the visible absorption spectrum there is a strong absorption band termed ν_{3} near 710 nm which is caused by an electronic transition from ^{3}T_{1}(F) → ^{3}T_{1}(P). Another strong absorption in the near infrared called ν_{2} near 770 nm is due to the ^{3}T_{1}(F) → ^{3}A_{2}(F) transition.

== Salts ==
Dilithium tetrabromonickelate forms a dark blue solution in tetrahydrofuran.

A mixture of lithium bromide and nickel bromide in water or methanol can transfer [NiBr_{4}]^{2−} ions into a cyclohexane-amine mixture. The solution formed is green.

Tetraethylammonium tetrabromonickelate is blue.

tetra-n-butylammonium tetrabromonickelate is purple blue in color, melting around 83°C. It is formed from nickel bromide and tetra-n-butylammonium bromide in ethyl alcohol.

Tetraphenylphosphonium tetrabromonickelate(II) can be made from nickel bromide, triphenylphosphine, and bromobenzene by heating them together in a sealed tube at 250 °C. This substance is dark blue. If it is heated over 260° the color changes to green, and it melts at 273 °C.

A dark blue oil, bis-(o-tolyltriethylphosphonium) tetrabromonickelate (o-CH_{3}C_{6}H_{6}PEt_{3})_{2}NiBr_{4} can be made from the reaction of o-tolyl bis-triethylphosphine, nickel bromide and o-tolyl bromide. (o-CH_{3}OC_{6}H_{6}PEt_{3})_{2}NiBr_{4} and (C_{6}H_{5}PEt_{3})_{2}NiBr_{4} are made in a similar way.

bis-(benzo[e]-1,3-dithiepan-2-diethylimmonium) tetrabromonickelate, abbreviated as (xdtc)_{2}NiBr_{4}, has dark blue crystals that melt at 166 °C. It is made from α,α'-dibromo-o-xylene and bis-(N,N-diethyldithiocarbamato)nickel(II) dissolved in 1,2-dichloroethane.

bis-(tetra-n-butylphosphonium) tetrabromonickelate can form as a glass when nickel bromide is dissolved in molten tetra-n-butylphosphonium iodide.

Blue 1,1,1-trimethylhydrazinium tetrabromonickelate [H_{2}NN(CH_{3})_{3}]_{2}NiBr_{4} is a salt stable between 70° and 260 °C. It can be formed by heating an octahedral neutral nickel complex where the trimethylhydrazinium and bromide are all ligands on a nickel atom. The salt decomposes at room temperature to polymeric trimethylhydrazinium nickel tribromide. The salt decomposes when dissolved in polar solvents, due to solvolysis.

== Related ==
One bromine atom can be substituted by other ligands, such as triphenylphosphine, to make a dark green triphenylphosphinetribromonickelate ion. Analogous tetrahedral nickelates include tetrafluoronickelates, tetrachloronickelates, tetraiodonickelates, and tetracyanonickelates.
