= Germanium dichloride =

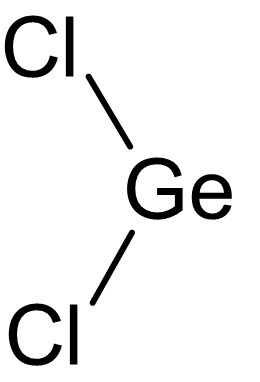

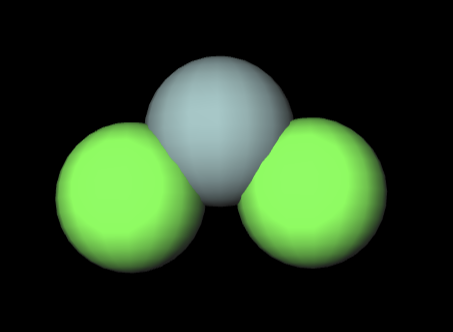

Names
- Preferred IUPAC name Germanium dichloride
- Systematic IUPAC name Dichlorogermanylidene
- Other names Dichlorogermylene Germanium(II) chloride Germanous chloride

Identifiers
CAS Number	10060-11-4
3D model (JSmol)	Interactive image
ChemSpider	4885679
ECHA InfoCard	100.030.162
EC Number	233-192-1
PubChem CID	6327122
UNII	SI7JKX4F22
CompTox Dashboard (EPA)	DTXSID40143425
- InChI: InChI=1S/Cl2Ge/c1-3-2 Key: QHGIKMVOLGCZIP-UHFFFAOYSA-N
- SMILES: Cl[Ge]Cl

Properties
Chemical formula	GeCl_{2}
Molar mass	143.546 g/mol
Appearance	white-pale yellow solid
- Except where otherwise noted, data are given for materials in their standard state (at 25 °C [77 °F], 100 kPa). Infobox references

Germanium dichloride is a chemical compound of germanium and chlorine with the formula GeCl_{2}. It is a yellow solid. Germanium dichloride is an example of a compound featuring germanium in the +2 oxidation state.

== Preparation ==
Solid germanium dichloride can be produced by comproportionation by passing germanium tetrachloride, GeCl_{4}, over germanium metal at 300 °C and reduced pressure (0.1 mmHg).

GeCl_{4} + Ge → 2 GeCl_{2}

Germanium dichloride is also formed from the decomposition of trichlorogermane, GeHCl_{3}, at 70 °C. Trichlorogermane is generated when germanium reacts with hydrogen chloride. This reaction involves dehydrohalogenation.

GeHCl_{3} → GeCl_{2} + HCl

Another route to germanium dichloride is the reduction of germanium tetrachloride with hydrogen at 800 °C.

GeCl_{4} + H_{2} → GeCl_{2} + 2HCl

== Reactions ==
GeCl_{2} is hydrolysed to give yellow germanium(II) hydroxide, which on warming gives brown germanium monoxide:

GeCl_{2} + 2 H_{2}O ⇌ Ge(OH)_{2}(s) + 2 HCl
Ge(OH)_{2} → GeO + H_{2}O

Alkalizing a solution containing germanium(II) ions:

Ge^{2+} + 2 OH^{−} → Ge(OH)_{2}

Germanium oxides and hydroxides are amphoteric. Solutions of GeCl_{2} in HCl are strongly reducing. With chloride ion, ionic compounds containing the pyramidal GeCl^{−}_{3} ion have been characterised, for example With rubidium and caesium chloride compounds, e.g. RbGeCl_{3} are produced; these have distorted perovskite structures.

Germanium dichloride reacts with tetraethylammonium chloride to give the trichlorogermanate:

GeCl_{2} + Et_{4}NCl → Et_{4}NGeCl_{3}

== Dichlorogermylene ==
Molecular GeCl_{2} is often called dichlorogermylene, highlighting its resemblance to a carbene. The structure of gas-phase molecular GeCl_{2} shows that it is a bent molecule, as predicted by VSEPR theory. The dioxane complex, GeCl_{2}·dioxane, has been used as a source of molecular GeCl_{2} for reaction syntheses, as has the in situ reaction of GeCl_{4} and Ge metal. GeCl_{2} is quite reactive and inserts into many types of chemical bonds. Usually, germanium dichloride is generated from germanium dichloride dioxane.
