= Germanium dichloride dioxane =

Identifiers
CAS Number	28595-67-7
3D model (JSmol)	Interactive image
ChemSpider	9032596
EC Number	608-226-7
PubChem CID	10857305
CompTox Dashboard (EPA)	DTXSID70446118
- InChI: InChI=1S/C4H8O2.Cl2Ge/c1-2-6-4-3-5-1;1-3-2/h1-4H2; Key: NYMJLNHIEKAQSD-UHFFFAOYSA-N
- SMILES: C1COCCO1.Cl[Ge]Cl

Properties
Chemical formula	C_{4}H_{8}Cl_{2}GeO_{2}
Molar mass	231.64 g·mol^{−1}
Appearance	white solid
Density	1.942 g/cm^{3}

Hazards
- GHS labelling
Pictograms	(GHS05: Corrosive) (GHS07: Exclamation mark) (GHS08: Health hazard)
Signal word	Warning
Hazard statements	H314, H332, H351
Precautionary statements	P203, P260, P264, P271, P280, P301+P330+P331, P302+P361+P354, P304+P340, P305+P354+P338, P316, P317, P318, P321, P363, P405, P501
- Except where otherwise noted, data are given for materials in their standard state (at 25 °C [77 °F], 100 kPa). Infobox references

Germanium dichloride dioxane is a chemical compound with the formula GeCl_{2}(C_{4}H_{8}O_{2}), where C_{4}H_{8}O_{2} is 1,4-dioxane. It is a white solid. The compound is notable as a source of Ge(II), which contrasts with the pervasiveness of Ge(IV) compounds. This dioxane complex represents a well-behaved form of germanium dichloride.

== Synthesis and structure ==
It is prepared by reduction of a dioxane solution of germanium tetrachloride with tributyltin hydride:

GeCl_{4} + 2 Bu_{3}SnH + C_{4}H_{8}O_{2} → GeCl_{2}(O_{2}C_{4}H_{8}) + 2 Bu_{3}SnCl + H_{2}

Hydrosilanes have also been used as reductants.

The complex has a polymeric structure. Germanium adopts an SF_{4}-like shape with cis Cl ligands (Cl-Ge-Cl angle = 94.4°) and axial positions occupied by oxygen provided by a bridging dioxane. The Ge-O and Ge-Cl distances are 2.40 and 2.277 A, respectively.

== Reactions ==
The complex is used in the preparation of organogermanium compounds. In organic synthesis, the complex is used as a Lewis acid with reducing properties.
