= Tetraethylammonium tetrachloronickelate =

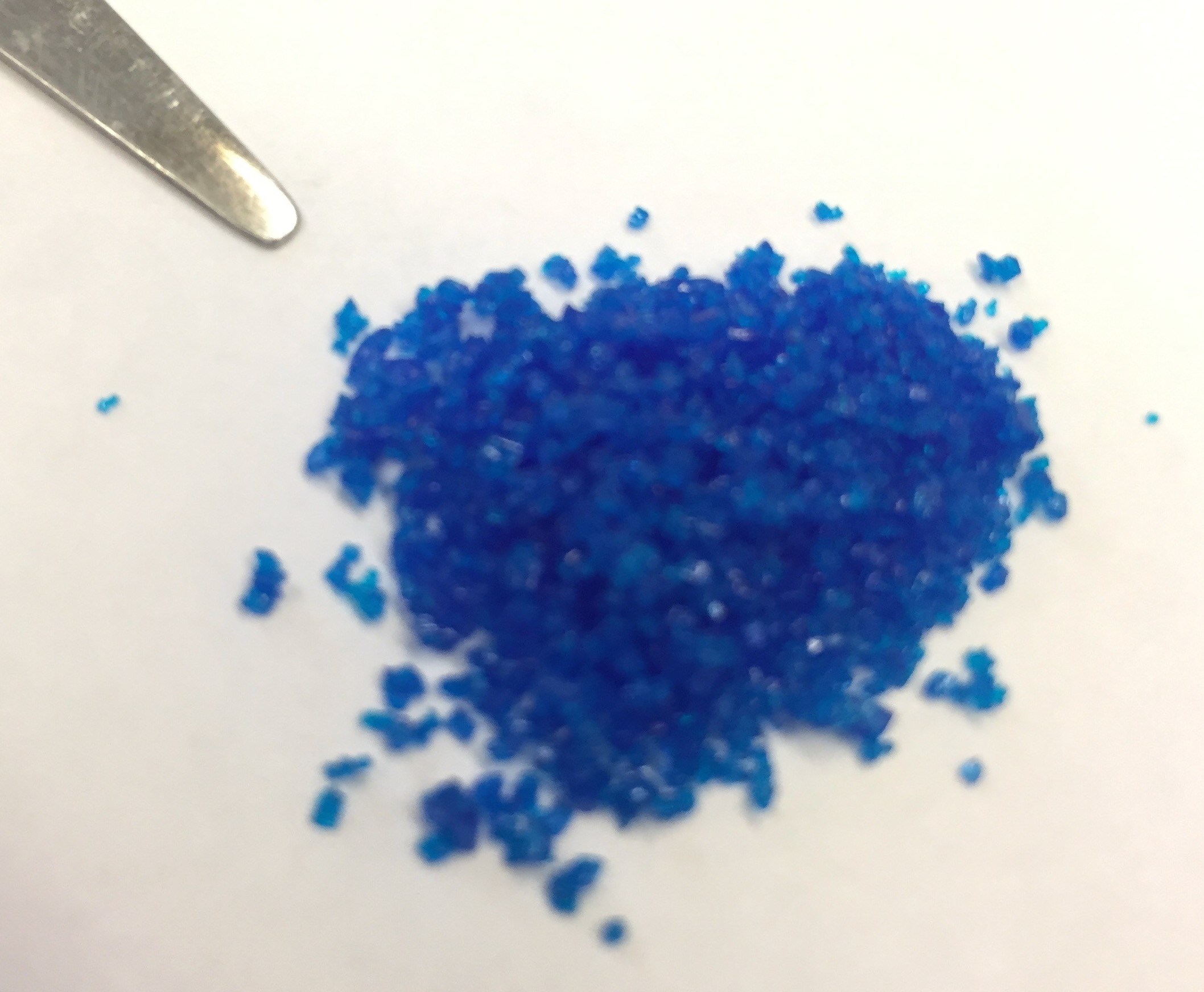
- (Et_{4}N)_{2}NiCl_{4} crystals

Identifiers
CAS Number	5964-71-6
3D model (JSmol)	Interactive image
ChemSpider	32815221
ECHA InfoCard	100.152.710
EC Number	624-087-5
PubChem CID	13437962
CompTox Dashboard (EPA)	DTXSID00540835
- InChI: InChI=1S/2C8H20N.4ClH.Ni/c2*1-5-9(6-2,7-3)8-4;;;;;/h2*5-8H2,1-4H3;4*1H;/q2*+1;;;;;+2/p-4 Key: LBROWQNNUGFYKG-UHFFFAOYSA-J
- SMILES: CC[N+](CC)(CC)CC.CC[N+](CC)(CC)CC.Cl[Ni]([Cl-])([Cl-])Cl

Properties
Chemical formula	C_{16}H_{40}Cl_{4}N_{2}Ni
Molar mass	461.00 g·mol^{−1}
Appearance	blue solid
Density	1.358 g/cm^{3}

Hazards
- GHS labelling
Pictograms	(GHS05: Corrosive) (GHS07: Exclamation mark) (GHS09: Environmental hazard)
Signal word	Danger
Hazard statements	H314, H317, H350
Precautionary statements	P201, P202, P260, P264, P272, P280, P281, P301+P330+P331, P302+P352, P303+P361+P353, P304+P340, P305+P351+P338, P308+P313, P310, P321, P333+P313, P363, P405, P501
- Except where otherwise noted, data are given for materials in their standard state (at 25 °C [77 °F], 100 kPa). Infobox references

Tetraethylammonium tetrachloronickelate is the chemical compound with the formula (N(C_{2}H_{5})_{4})_{2}NiCl_{4}. It is the tetraethylammonium salt of the blue-colored tetrahedral anion [NiCl_{4}]^{2-}. Several tetrachloronickelate salts are known. They are paramagnetic.
