= Tetraethylammonium trichloride =

Names
- Other names Mioskowski reagent

Identifiers
CAS Number	13557-92-1
3D model (JSmol)	Interactive image
PubChem CID	134992260
- InChI: InChI=1S/C8H20N.Cl3/c1-5-9(6-2,7-3)8-4;1-3-2/h5-8H2,1-4H3;/q+1;-1 Key: IDJACJWSDMBREZ-UHFFFAOYSA-N
- SMILES: CC[N+](CC)(CC)CC.Cl[Cl-]Cl

Properties
Chemical formula	C_{8}H_{20}Cl_{3}N
Molar mass	236.61 g·mol^{−1}
Appearance	yellow solid
Solubility	Dichloromethane, ethanol, acetonitrile, pyridine
log P	3.95

Related compounds
Related compounds	Triethylmethylammonium trichloride
- Except where otherwise noted, data are given for materials in their standard state (at 25 °C [77 °F], 100 kPa). Infobox references

Tetraethylammonium trichloride (also known as Mioskowski reagent) is a chemical compound with the formula [(CH_{3}CH_{2})_{4}N][Cl_{3}] consisting of a tetraethylammonium cations [(CH_{3}CH_{2})_{4}N]^{+} and trichloride anions [Cl_{3}]^{−}. The trichloride is also known as trichlorine monoanion representing one of the simplest polychlorine anions. Tetraethylammonium trichloride is used as reagent for chlorinations and oxidation reactions.

== Properties ==
At room temperature, tetraethylammonium trichloride is a yellow solid which is soluble in polar organic solvents (e.g., methylene chloride or acetonitrile). As it is a strong oxidant and chlorinating agent it reacts with most organic solvents. The trichloride can be considered as an symmetric anion as found in tetrapropylammonium trichloride [(CH_{3}CH_{2}CH_{2})_{4}N][Cl_{3}], which is formed by a 3c-4e bond.

== Preparation ==
Commonly, tetraethylammonium trichloride is prepared by the reaction of tetraethylammonium chloride and elemental chlorine in methylene chloride at room temperature. After evaporation of the solvent, tetraethylammonium trichloride is obtained as a yellow solid.

[(CH_{3}CH_{2})_{4}N]Cl + Cl_{2} → [(CH_{3}CH_{2})_{4}N][Cl_{3}]

Recently, an alternative preparation of tetraethylammonium trichloride has been described using tetraethylammonium chloride and potassium peroxymonosulfate as oxidant.

== Applications ==
Tetraethyl ammonium trichloride reactions

In general, tetraethylammonium trichloride has a similar reactivity compared to elemental chlorine and other trichlorides, e.g., triethylmethylammonium trichloride. As tetraethylammonium trichloride is a solid and can be dissolved in methylene chloride or acetonitrile, it is used as an easier to handle alternative to elemental chlorine, in particular for the synthesis of intermediates in natural product synthesis. Tetraethylammonium trichloride reacts with alkenes to the corresponding vicinal 1,2-dichlorinated alkanes and similarly with alkynes to the corresponding trans-dichlorinated alkenes. Electron rich arenes are chlorinated in para-position. While aldehydes are dichlorinated in alpha-position, ketones react to the monochlorinated alpha-chloroketones. In presence of 1,4-diazabicyclo[2.2.2]octane tetraethylammonium trichloride is a useful oxidant for the oxidation of primary alcohols to the corresponding aldehydes and of secondary alcohols to the corresponding ketones. For compounds bearing both a primary and a secondary alcohol, selective oxidation of the secondary alcohol is observed. Acetals undergo C-H chlorination of the tertiary C-H bond providing the corresponding chlorinated acetals.
