= Triethylmethylammonium trichloride =

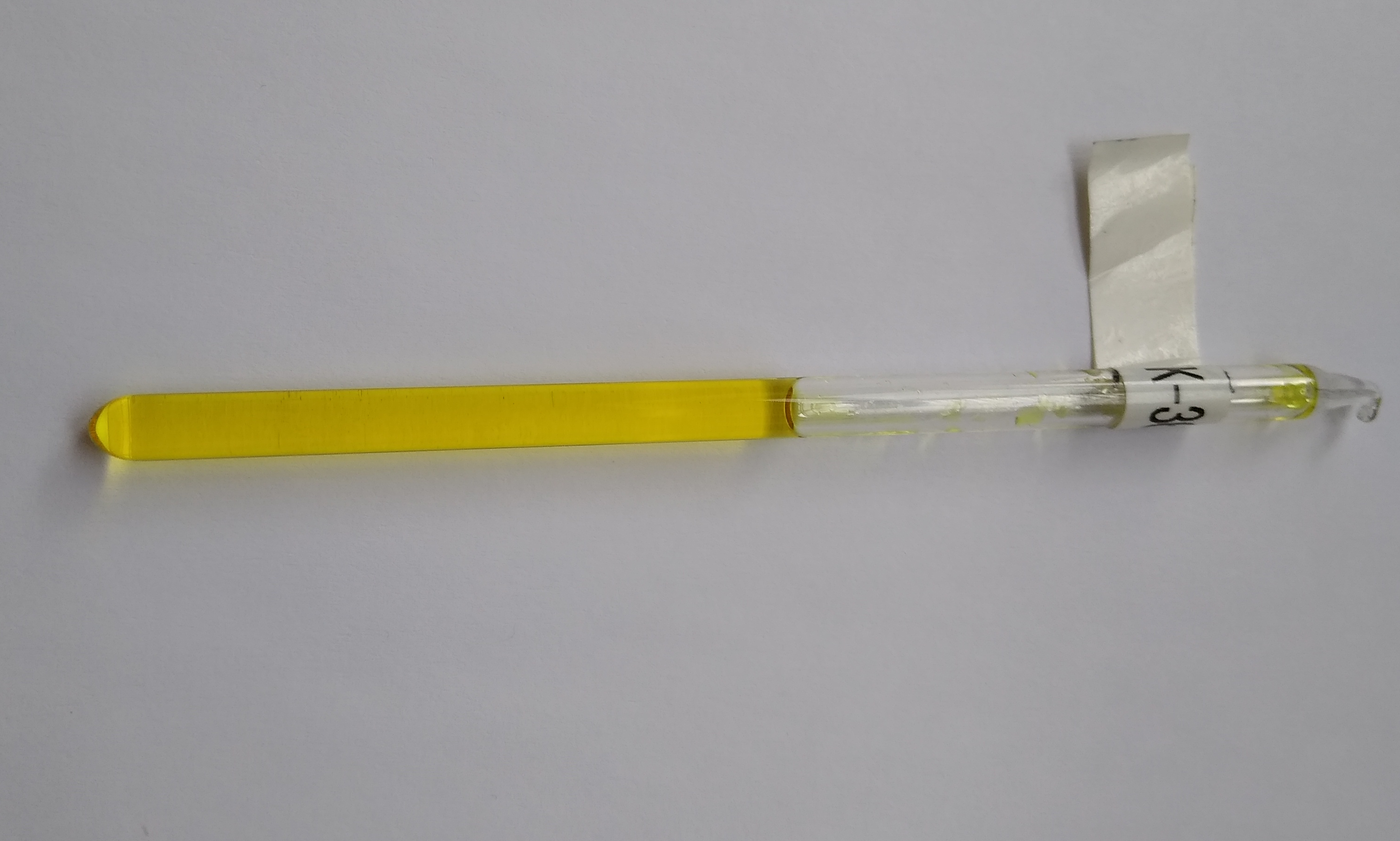

Identifiers
| CAS Number | 2460902-02-5 |
| 3D model (JSmol) | Interactive image |
| ChemSpider | 109120029 |
| PubChem CID | 162420758 |
- InChI: InChI=1S/C7H18N.Cl3/c1-5-8(4,6-2)7-3;1-3-2/h5-7H2,1-4H3;/q+1;-1 Key: BZFQYOSNSCXXBQ-UHFFFAOYSA-N
- SMILES: CC[N+](CC)(CC)C.Cl[Cl-]Cl

Properties
| Chemical formula | C_{7}H_{18}Cl_{3}N |
| Molar mass | 222.58 g·mol^{−1} |
| Appearance | yellow liquid |
| Melting point | −10 °C (14 °F; 263 K) |

Related compounds
| Related compounds | Tetraethylammonium trichloride |
- Except where otherwise noted, data are given for materials in their standard state (at 25 °C [77 °F], 100 kPa). Infobox references

Triethylmethylammonium trichloride [NEt3Me][Cl3] is an ionic liquid consisting of an asymmetric triethylmethylammonium cation and a trichloride anion. The trichloride is also known as trichlorine monoanion representing one of the simplest polychlorine anions.

== Preparation ==
Triethylmethylammonium trichloride is prepared by the reaction of triethylmethylammonium chloride and elemental chlorine gas.

[NEt_{3}Me]Cl + Cl_{2} → [NEt_{3}Me][Cl_{3}]

== Structure and chemical bonding ==
According to the halogen bonding concept, the trichloride anion can be described as a donor-acceptor complex consisting of a chloride anion (the halogen donor) and a dichlorine molecule (the halogen acceptor). By donation of electron density of the chloride anion into the σ-hole of the dichlorine molecule lying along the Cl-Cl bonding axis. In this way, the trichloride anion ([Cl-Cl-Cl]^{−}) is formed which theoretically adopts a linear geometry with Cl-Cl bonds of equal length. However, the real structure of the trichloride anion is typically slightly different due to interaction of the trichloride anion with cations or anisotropic effects in the solid state.

A more precise definition of triethylmethylammonium trichloride is given by the sum formula [NEt_{3}Me][Cl(Cl_{2})_{n}] where n is the number of equivalents of dichlorine that are bonded. By addition of elemental chlorine to [NEt_{3}Me]Cl (n = 0), the value of n increases continuously forming the trichloride [NEt_{3}Me][Cl_{3}] (n = 1), the pentachloride [NEt_{3}Me][Cl_{5}] (n = 2) and, at higher chlorine loadings, higher polychlorides. For values of n < 0.8, [NEt_{3}Me][Cl(Cl_{2})_{n}] is a yellow solid, while for n > 0.8 [NEt_{3}Me][Cl(Cl_{2})_{n}] exists as an ionic liquid at room temperature.

== Applications ==
Triethylmethylammonium trichloride [NEt3Me][Cl3] shows a similar reactivity like tetraethylammonium trichloride or elemental chlorine but is easier to handle than chlorine gas as it is a liquid at room temperature. For instance, alkenes are chlorinated with triethylmethylammonium trichloride providing the corresponding vicinal 1,2-dichloroalkanes. Recently, the reaction of triethylmethylammonium trichloride with carbon monoxide to form phosgene was described. In this reaction, carbon monoxide is oxidized at room temperature. Alternatively, the reaction can be performed utilizing catalytical amounts of [NEt_{3}Me]Cl in the presence of elemental chlorine forming presumably the catalytically active species [NEt_{3}Me][Cl_{3}] which reacts with carbon monoxide yielding phosgene and forming [NEt_{3}Me]Cl.

[NEt_{3}Me][Cl_{3}] + CO → COCl_{2} + [NEt_{3}Me]Cl
