= 4-Bromophenylacetic acid =

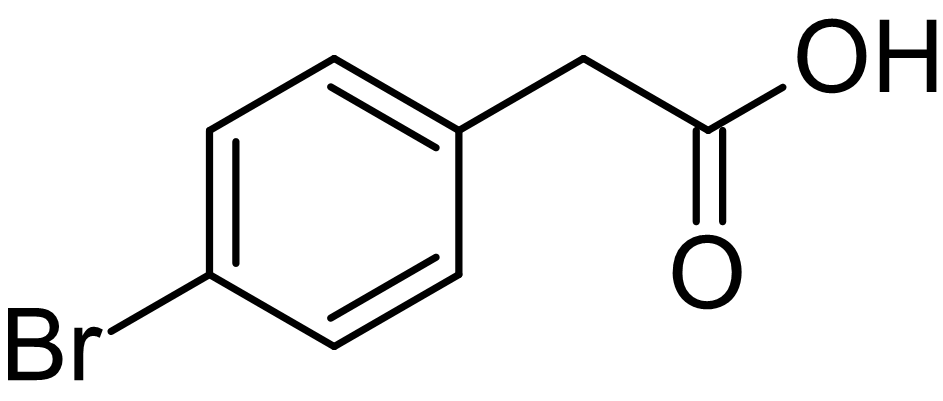
- Structural formula

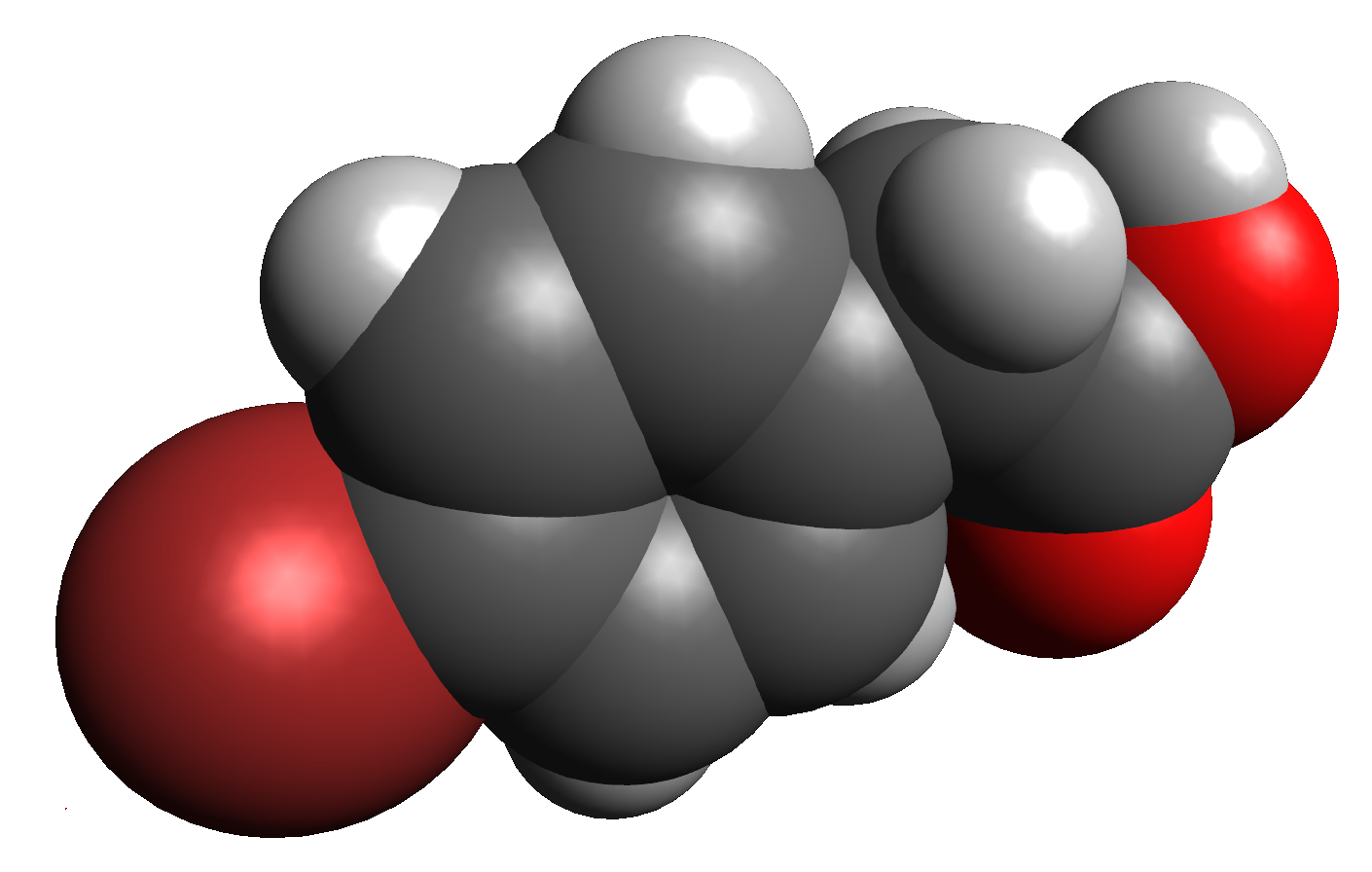
- Van der Waals space-filling model of 4-bromophenylacetic acid

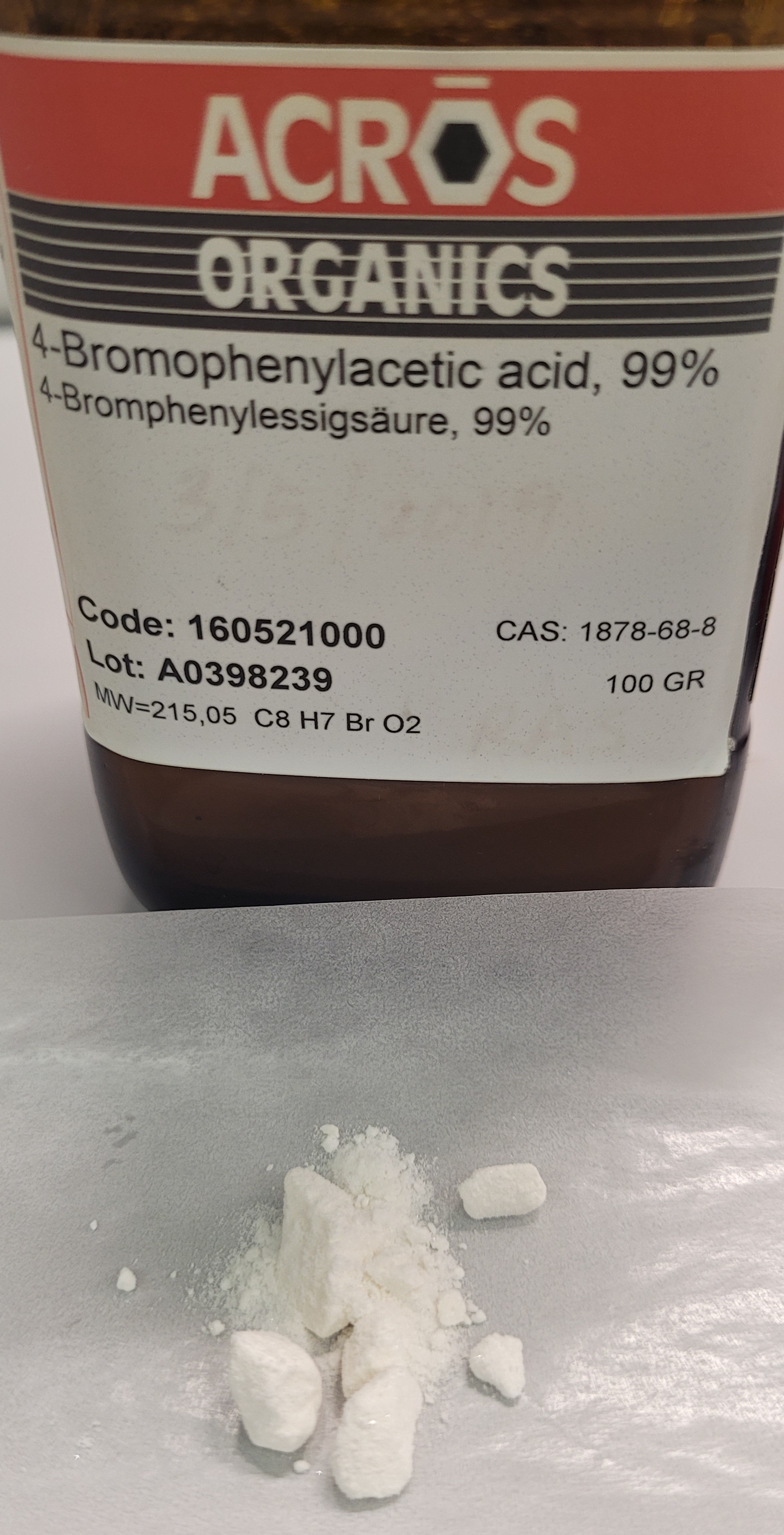
- 4-bromophenylacetic acid sample

Names
- Preferred IUPAC name (4-Bromophenyl)acetic acid
- Other names p-Bromophenylacetic acid 2-(4-bromobenzene)acetic acid

Identifiers
CAS Number	1878-68-8
3D model (JSmol)	Interactive image
ChEBI	CHEBI:1790
ChemSpider	67229
ECHA InfoCard	100.015.931
EC Number	217-523-7
KEGG	C03076
PubChem CID	74654
UNII	WA6UT8W6AJ
CompTox Dashboard (EPA)	DTXSID2062032
- InChI: InChI=1S/C8H7BrO2/c9-7-3-1-6(2-4-7)5-8(10)11/h1-4H,5H2,(H,10,11) Key: QOWSWEBLNVACCL-UHFFFAOYSA-N; InChI=1S/C8H7BrO2/c9-7-3-1-6(2-4-7)5-8(10)11/h1-4H,5H2,(H,10,11) Key: QOWSWEBLNVACCL-UHFFFAOYSA-N
- SMILES: C1=CC(=CC=C1CC(=O)O)Br

Properties
Chemical formula	C_{8}H_{7}BrO_{2}
Molar mass	215.046 g·mol^{−1}
Appearance	White solid
Odor	Honey-like
Melting point	118 °C (244 °F; 391 K)
Conjugate base	4-Bromophenylacetate

Hazards
- GHS labelling
Pictograms	(GHS07: Exclamation mark)
Signal word	Danger
Hazard statements	H318, H319
Precautionary statements	P264, P280, P305+P351+P338, P310, P337+P313
Safety data sheet (SDS)	External MSDS
- Except where otherwise noted, data are given for materials in their standard state (at 25 °C [77 °F], 100 kPa). Infobox references

4-Bromophenylacetic acid, also known as p-bromophenylacetic acid, is an organic compound. It is a derivative of phenylacetic acid containing a bromine atom in the para position.

== Preparation ==
4-Bromophenylacetic acid may be prepared by the addition of a bromine atom to phenylacetic acid through electrophilic aromatic substitution. It was first prepared in the laboratory by treatment of phenylacetic acid with bromine and mercuric oxide; a mixture of the 2- and 4- isomers is made, and the 4- isomer is isolated by fractional crystallization.

It can also be made by condensing 4-bromobenzyl bromide with sodium cyanide in ethanol, and then hydrolyzing the nitrile with sodium hydroxide.

== Reactions ==
Methyl 4-bromophenylacetate is made from 4-bromophenylacetic acid by Fischer esterification, refluxing it with methanol acidified with sulfuric acid. An ethyl ester can be made in an analogous way using ethanol instead of methanol.

A hydrazone derivative, 2-(4-bromophenyl)acetohydrazide, is made by refluxing the methyl ester with hydrazine. Further hydrazone derivatives of 4-bromophenylacetic acid are made by condensing the simple hydrazone with aldehydes, forming a double bond with the second nitrogen. At least 19 of these hydrazones are known.

4-Bromophenylacetic acid is a chemical that can be purchased.

Plant protoplasts conjugate aspartic acid with 4-bromophenylacetic acid to form 4-bromophenylacetyl-L-aspartic acid.

4-Bromophenylacetic acid reacts with sodium tetraphenylborate to form felbinac which can be further converted to xenbucin.

== Properties ==
The ionic conductance has been measured.
