= Iodocubane =

Names
- IUPAC name 1-iodocubane

Identifiers
CAS Number	74725-77-2
3D model (JSmol)	Interactive image
ChemSpider	127635
ECHA InfoCard	100.459.902
EC Number	129-577-8
PubChem CID	144672
CompTox Dashboard (EPA)	DTXSID30225709
- InChI: InChI=1S/C8H7I/c9-8-5-2-1-3(5)7(8)4(1)6(2)8/h1-7H Key: DEYQFBOPZRDWKH-UHFFFAOYSA-N
- SMILES: C12C3C4C1C5C2C3C45I

Properties
Chemical formula	C_{8}H_{7}I
Molar mass	230.048 g·mol^{−1}

Hazards
- GHS labelling
Pictograms	(GHS07: Exclamation mark)
Signal word	Warning
Hazard statements	H315, H319, H335
Precautionary statements	P261, P264, P264+P265, P271, P280, P302+P352, P304+P340, P305+P351+P338, P319, P321, P332+P317, P337+P317, P362+P364, P403+P233, P405, P501
- Except where otherwise noted, data are given for materials in their standard state (at 25 °C [77 °F], 100 kPa). Infobox references

Iodocubane is a chemical compound in which one hydrogen atom in the cubane molecule is replaced by iodine.

== Synthesis ==
Iodocubane can be prepared from cubane-1,4-dicarboxylic acid via at least two routes.

The first route proceeds via esterification to the monomethyl ester, decarboxylative iodination to methyl 4-iodocubane-1-carboxylate using phenyliodine(III) diacetate, followed by hydrolysis and Barton decarboxylation.

The second route proceeds via decarboxylative iodination to 1,4-diiodocubane, followed by monodeiodination via metal–halogen exchange with ethylmagnesium bromide, transmetallation with n-butyllithium, and acid hydrolysis.

== Use ==
Iodocubane is employed in the synthesis of other monosubstituted cubanes.
