= Allidochlor =

Obsolete herbicide introduced in 1958

Names
- IUPAC name N,N-Diallyl-2-chloroacetamide
- Preferred IUPAC name 2-Chloro-N,N-di(prop-2-en-1-yl)acetamide
- Other names 2-Chloro-N,N-di-2-propenylacetamide

Identifiers
CAS Number	93-71-0
3D model (JSmol)	Interactive image
ChEBI	CHEBI:82170
ChEMBL	ChEMBL2251312
ChemSpider	6890
ECHA InfoCard	100.002.065
EC Number	202-270-7
KEGG	C19043
PubChem CID	7157
UNII	2E0WF154QR
UN number	2996 (RANDOX)
CompTox Dashboard (EPA)	DTXSID2041591
- InChI: InChI=1S/C8H12ClNO/c1-3-5-10(6-4-2)8(11)7-9/h3-4H,1-2,5-7H2 Key: MDBGGTQNNUOQRC-UHFFFAOYSA-N
- SMILES: C=CCN(CC=C)C(=O)CCl

Properties
Chemical formula	C_{8}H_{12}ClNO
Molar mass	173.64 g·mol^{−1}
Appearance	Oily amber coloured liquid
Density	1088 kg/m^{3}
Melting point	25 °C (77 °F; 298 K)
Boiling point	74 °C (165 °F; 347 K)
Solubility in water	197 g/L
Vapor pressure	1250 mPa

Hazards
- GHS labelling
Pictograms	(GHS07: Exclamation mark) (GHS09: Environmental hazard)
Signal word	Warning
Hazard statements	H302, H311, H315, H319, H411
Precautionary statements	P264, P270, P273, P280, P301+P312+P330, P302+P352+P312, P337+P313, P361+P364, P391, P501
Flash point	186 °C (367 °F; 459 K)
- Lethal dose or concentration (LD, LC)
LD_{50} (median dose)	700 mg/kg (rat, oral) 360 mg/kg (rat, dermal)
- Except where otherwise noted, data are given for materials in their standard state (at 25 °C [77 °F], 100 kPa). Infobox references

Allidochlor is a herbicide introduced in 1958. It is an obsolete amide herbicide, used preëmergently and postemergently.

Allidochlor's HRAC Group is Group 15, Group K3, Group K. (Numeric, Global, Australian)

== Application ==
Allidochlor has been used in Canada, where it was applied at high rates (7 kg/Ha) with much spraywater (500 L/Ha). At the time, 1984, allidochlor was registered for use on onions only in Canada, with leek usage not granted for lack of residue data.

== Environmental behaviour ==
Allidochlor is highly volatile and likely to bioconcentrate. Residue in leeks, treated with up to 3 applications of 7 kg/Ha of allidochlor, was under 100 ppb.

== Formulations ==
Formulations of allidochlor have been marketed as Randox, Randox T, Actox Granular, Vega-Rand and Cdaa 20 G, usually supplied as emulsifiable concentrate.
