= Trichlorostannate =

Identifiers
CAS Number	15529-74-5
3D model (JSmol)	Interactive image
- InChI: InChI=1S/3Cl.Sn/q3*-1;+2 Key: ZFLSFAQFLJXSOW-UHFFFAOYSA-N
- SMILES: [Cl-][Sn+2]([Cl-])[Cl-]

Properties
Chemical formula	SnCl_{3}^{−}
- Except where otherwise noted, data are given for materials in their standard state (at 25 °C [77 °F], 100 kPa). Infobox references

Trichlorostannate is the inorganic anion with the formula SnCl^{−}_{3}. It is the chloride adduct of stannous chloride:

SnCl_{2} + Cl^{−} → SnCl^{−}_{3}

The trichlorostannate anion is pyramidal in shape, being similar to trichlorogermanate (GeCl^{−}_{3}) and antimony trichloride.

The anion can be isolated as quaternary ammonium salt and cesium salts. The compound with the formula K_{2}SnCl_{4}·H_{2}O is a hydrated double salt, consisting of SnCl^{−}_{3} and Cl^{−}.

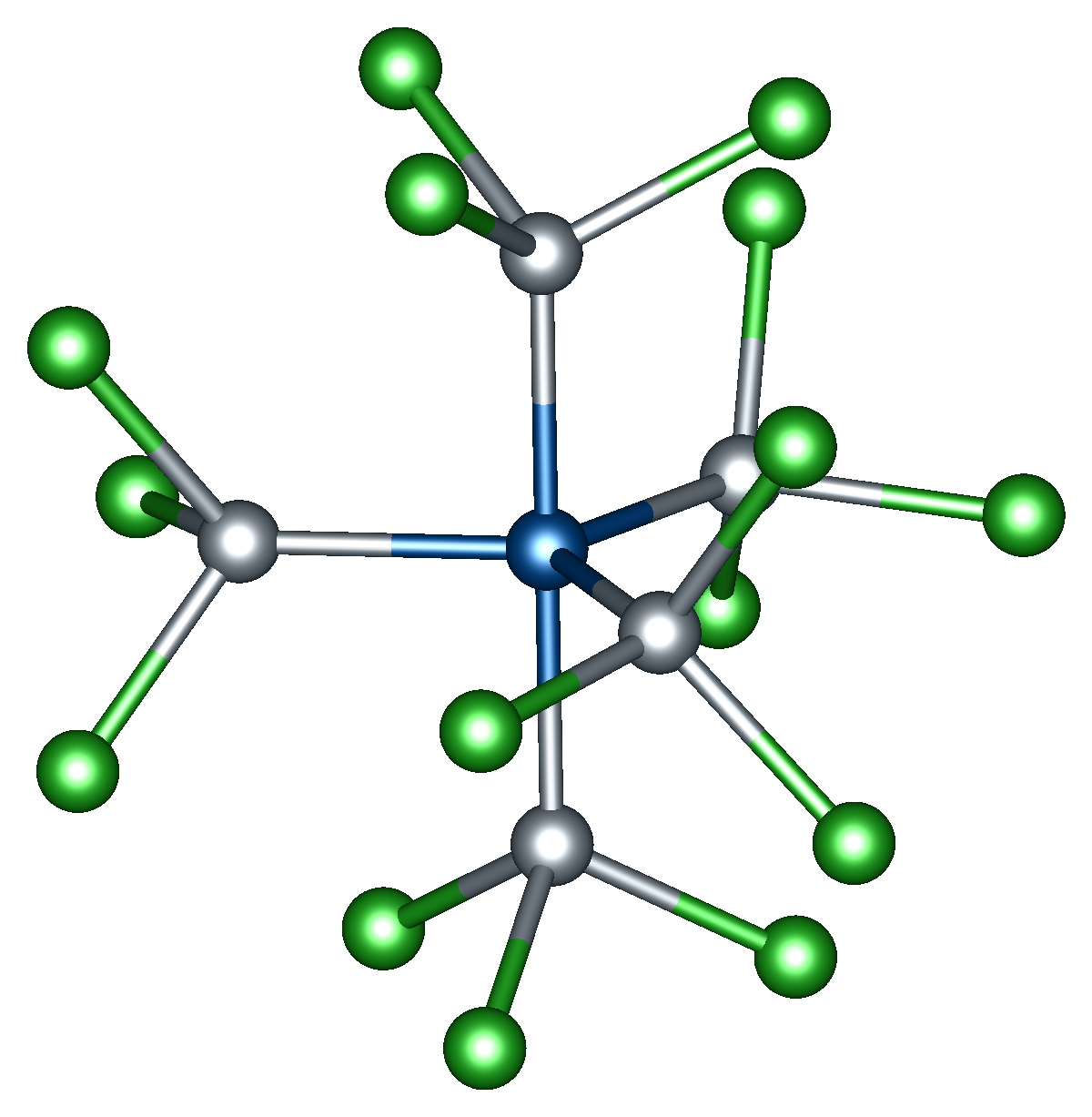
[Pt(SnCl_{3})_{5}]^{3-}. Color code: green = Cl, gray = Sn, blue = Pt.

Trichlorostannate serves as a ligand in coordination chemistry, illustrated by the complex [Pt(SnCl_{3})_{5}]^{3−}.
