= Tetraethylammonium tetrachloroferrate =

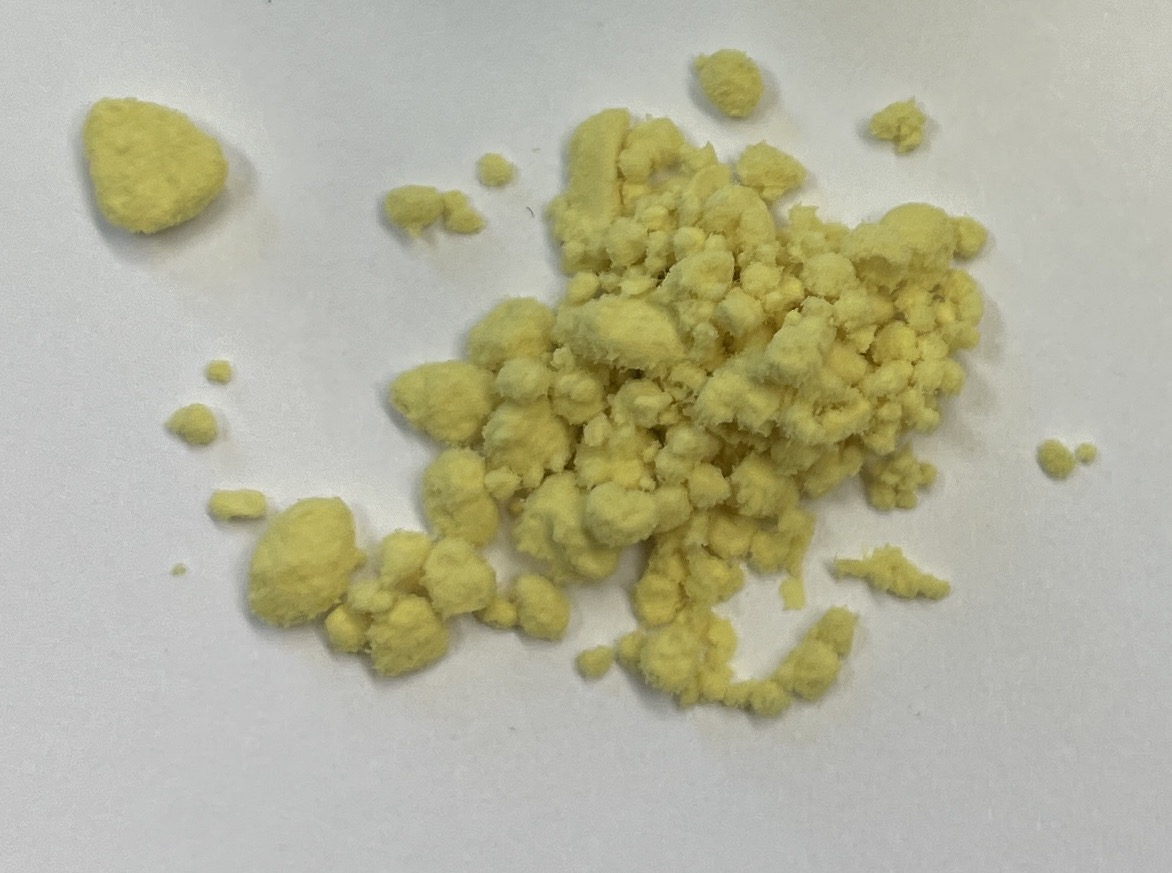

Identifiers
CAS Number	14240-75-6
3D model (JSmol)	Interactive image
ChemSpider	77429304
PubChem CID	15772697
CompTox Dashboard (EPA)	DTXSID70584327
- InChI: InChI=1S/C8H20N.4ClH.Fe/c1-5-9(6-2,7-3)8-4;;;;;/h5-8H2,1-4H3;4*1H;/q+1;;;;;+3/p-4 Key: QOQUNYOKJSALRF-UHFFFAOYSA-J
- SMILES: CC[N+](CC)(CC)CC.[Cl-].Cl[Fe](Cl)Cl

Properties
Chemical formula	C_{8}H_{20}Cl_{4}FeN
Molar mass	327.90 g·mol^{−1}
Appearance	yellow solid
Density	1.358 g/cm^{3}
- Except where otherwise noted, data are given for materials in their standard state (at 25 °C [77 °F], 100 kPa). Infobox references

Tetraethylammonium tetrachloroferrate is the chemical compound with the formula (N(C_{2}H_{5})_{4})FeCl_{4}. It is the tetraethylammonium salt of the tetrachloroferrate anion, [FeCl_{4}]^{−}.
