= Oxanamide =

Chemical compound

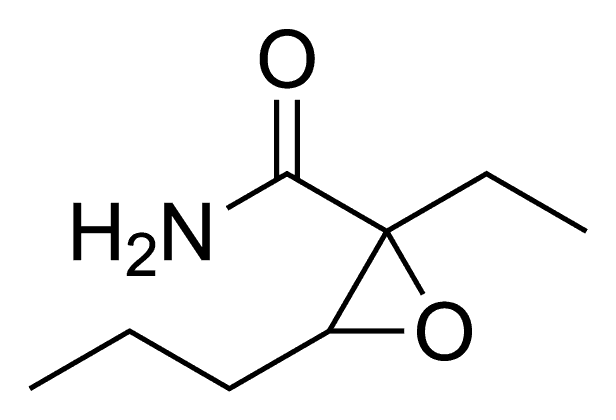

Clinical data
- ATC code: none

Identifiers
- IUPAC name: 2-ethyl-3-propyloxirane-2-carboxamide
- CAS Number: 126-93-2
- PubChem CID: 31365
- ChemSpider: 29098
- UNII: 050271194T
- CompTox Dashboard (EPA): DTXSID50925350

Chemical and physical data
- Formula: C_{8}H_{15}NO_{2}
- Molar mass: 157.213 g·mol^{−1}
- 3D model (JSmol): Interactive image
- SMILES: CCCC1C(O1)(CC)C(=O)N
- InChI: InChI=1S/C8H15NO2/c1-3-5-6-8(4-2,11-6)7(9)10/h6H,3-5H2,1-2H3,(H2,9,10); Key:WBLPIVIXQOFTPQ-UHFFFAOYSA-N

Oxanamide (Quiactin) is an anxiolytic and muscle relaxant which can produce sedative and hypnotic effects in sufficiently high doses. An uncontrolled trial on patients treated in a clinical gynecology practice published in 1959 found that oxanamide was efficacious in the treatment of anxiety resulting from premenstrual syndrome, menopause, and various other causes, with minimal sedation or other side effects.
