= Tetraethylammonium iodide =

Names
- Preferred IUPAC name N,N,N-Triethylethanaminium iodide
- Other names Tetamon iodide; Tetramon J; TEAI

Identifiers
CAS Number	68-05-3
3D model (JSmol)	Interactive image
ChemSpider	5990
ECHA InfoCard	100.000.615
PubChem CID	6225
UNII	5YC77AN7EB
CompTox Dashboard (EPA)	DTXSID80883217
- InChI: InChI=1S/C8H20N.HI/c1-5-9(6-2,7-3)8-4;/h5-8H2,1-4H3;1H/q+1;/p-1 Key: UQFSVBXCNGCBBW-UHFFFAOYSA-M; InChI=1/C8H20N.ClH/c1-5-9(6-2,7-3)8-4;/h5-8H2,1-4H3;1H/q+1;/p-1 Key: UQFSVBXCNGCBBW-UHFFFAOYSA-M
- SMILES: [I-].CC[N+](CC)(CC)CC

Properties
Chemical formula	C_{8}H_{20}IN
Molar mass	257.159 g·mol^{−1}
Appearance	Colorless or yellowish crystalline solid
Density	1.566 g/cm^{3}
Melting point	280 °C (536 °F; 553 K) (decomposes)
Solubility in water	soluble

Hazards
- Lethal dose or concentration (LD, LC)
LD_{50} (median dose)	35 mg/kg (mouse, i.p.); 56 mg/kg (mouse, i.v.)
- Except where otherwise noted, data are given for materials in their standard state (at 25 °C [77 °F], 100 kPa). Infobox references

Tetraethylammonium iodide is a quaternary ammonium compound with the chemical formula C_{8}H_{20}N^{+}I^{−}. It has been used as the source of tetraethylammonium ions in pharmacological and physiological studies, but is also used in organic chemical synthesis.

== Chemistry ==
=== Preparation ===
Tetraethylammonium iodide is commercially available, but can be prepared by the reaction between triethylamine and ethyl iodide.

=== Structure ===
The crystal structure of tetraethylammonium iodide has been determined. The crystal structure is a distorted wurtzite lattice. At the nitrogen atom, the coordination is a flattened tetrahedron. The N−C−C angle is slightly larger than the tetrahedral angle.

=== Synthetic applications ===
Examples include:

- Stereoselective formation of (Z)-diiodoalkenes by treatment of alkynes with ICl in the presence of tetraethylammonium iodide.
- 2-Hydroxyethylation (attachment of −CH_{2}−CH_{2}−OH) by ethylene carbonate of carboxylic acids and certain heterocycles bearing an acidic N-H. For example, benzoic acid is converted to the ester, 2-hydroxyethyl benzoate, by treatment with ethylene carbonate in the presence of tetraethylammonium iodide.
- Phase-transfer catalyst in geminal di-alkylation of fluorene, N,N-dialkylation of aniline and N-alkylation of carbazole using aqueous sodium hydroxide and alkyl halides.

== See also ==
- Tetraethylammonium
- Tetraethylammonium bromide
- Tetraethylammonium chloride
