= Tetraethylammonium chloride =

Names
- Preferred IUPAC name N,N,N-Triethylethanaminium chloride
- Other names Tetraethylammonium chloride N,N,N,N-Tetraethylammonium chloride

Identifiers
CAS Number	56-34-8
3D model (JSmol)	Interactive image
ChEBI	CHEBI:78161
ChemSpider	5733
ECHA InfoCard	100.000.243
PubChem CID	5946
UNII	8B82Z83XNN
CompTox Dashboard (EPA)	DTXSID6041137
- InChI: InChI=1S/C8H20N.ClH/c1-5-9(6-2,7-3)8-4;/h5-8H2,1-4H3;1H/q+1;/p-1 Key: YMBCJWGVCUEGHA-UHFFFAOYSA-M; InChI=1/C8H20N.ClH/c1-5-9(6-2,7-3)8-4;/h5-8H2,1-4H3;1H/q+1;/p-1 Key: YMBCJWGVCUEGHA-REWHXWOFAF
- SMILES: [Cl-].CC[N+](CC)(CC)CC

Properties
Chemical formula	[N(CH_{2}CH_{3})_{4}]Cl
Molar mass	165.71 g·mol^{−1}
Appearance	Colorless deliquescent crystalline solid
Density	1.08 g/cm^{3}
Melting point	360 °C (680 °F; 633 K) tetrahydrate
Solubility in water	highly soluble

Hazards
- Lethal dose or concentration (LD, LC)
LD_{50} (median dose)	65 mg/kg (mouse, i.p.); 900 mg/kg (mouse, p.o.)

Related compounds
Other anions	Tetraethylammonium trichloride; Tetraethylammonium fluoride; Tetraethylammonium bromide; Tetraethylammonium iodide; Tetraethylammonium nitrate
Other cations	Tetramethylammonium chloride; Tetrapropylammonium chloride; Tetrabutylammonium chloride
- Except where otherwise noted, data are given for materials in their standard state (at 25 °C [77 °F], 100 kPa). Infobox references

Tetraethylammonium chloride (TEAC) is a quaternary ammonium compound with the chemical formula [(CH_{3}CH_{2})_{4}N]Cl, sometimes written as [NEt_{4}]Cl, where Et stands for ethyl. In appearance, it is a hygroscopic, colorless, crystalline solid. It consists of tetraethylammonium cations [(CH_{3}CH_{2})_{4}N]^{+} and chloride anions Cl^{−}. It has been used as the source of tetraethylammonium ions in pharmacological and physiological studies, but is also used in organic chemical synthesis.

== Preparation and structure ==
TEAC is produced by alkylation of triethylamine with ethyl chloride.

TEAC exists as either of two stable hydrates, the monohydrate and tetrahydrate. The crystal structure of TEAC·H_{2}O has been determined, as has that of the tetrahydrate, TEAC·4H_{2}O.

Details for the preparation of large, prismatic crystals of TEAC·H_{2}O are given by Harmon and Gabriele, who carried out IR-spectroscopic studies on this and related compounds. These researchers have also pointed out that, although freshly-purified TEAC·H_{2}O is free of triethylamine hydrochloride, small quantities of this compound form on heating of TEAC as the result of a Hofmann elimination:

Cl^{−} + [N(CH_{2}CH_{3})_{4}]^{+} → HCl + H_{2}C=CH_{2} + N(CH_{2}CH_{3})_{3}

== Synthetic applications ==
To a large extent, the synthetic applications of TEAC resemble those of tetraethylammonium bromide (TEAB) and tetraethylammonium iodide (TEAI), although one of the salts may be more efficacious than another in a particular reaction. For example, TEAC produces better yields than TEAB or TEAI as a co-catalyst in a reaction to prepare diarylureas from arylamines, nitroaromatics and carbon monoxide.

In other examples, such as the following, TEAC is not as effective as TEAB or TEAI:

- 2-Hydroxyethylation (attachment of −CH_{2}−CH_{2}−OH) by ethylene carbonate of carboxylic acids and certain heterocycles bearing an acidic N-H.
- Phase-transfer catalyst in geminal di-alkylation of fluorene, N,N-dialkylation of aniline and N-alkylation of carbazole using aqueous sodium hydroxide and alkyl halides.

== Biology ==
In common with tetraethylammonium bromide and tetraethylammonium iodide, TEAC has been used as a source of tetraethylammonium ions for numerous clinical and pharmacological studies, which are covered in more detail under the entry for Tetraethylammonium. Briefly, TEAC has been explored clinically for its ganglionic blocking properties, although it is now essentially obsolete as a drug, and it is still used in physiological research for its ability to block K^{+} channels in various tissues.

== Toxicity ==
The toxicity of TEAC is primarily due to the tetraethylammonium ion, which has been studied extensively. The acute toxicity of TEAC is comparable to that of tetraethylammonium bromide and tetraethylammonium iodide. These data are provided for comparative purposes; additional details may be found in the entry for Tetraethylammonium.

== See also ==
- Tetraethylammonium
- Tetraethylammonium bromide
- Tetraethylammonium iodide
- Tetramethylammonium chloride
