= Tetraethylammonium bromide =

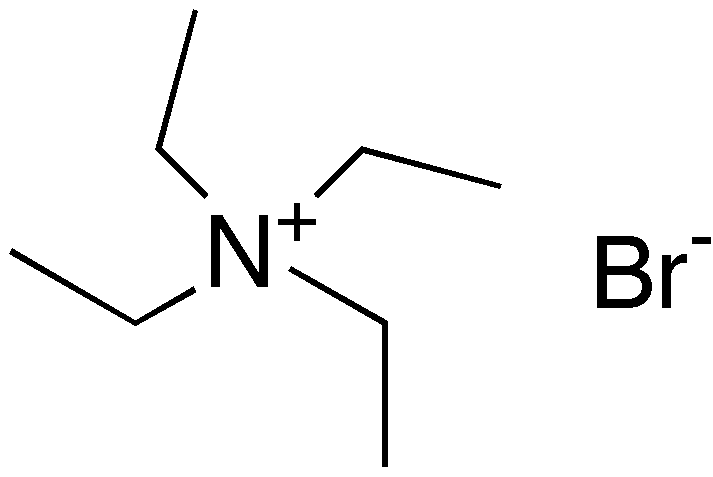

Names
- Preferred IUPAC name N,N,N-Triethylethanaminium bromide
- Other names Tetrylammonium bromide, TEA, TEABr

Identifiers
CAS Number	71-91-0
3D model (JSmol)	Interactive image
ChEMBL	ChEMBL324254
ChemSpider	6048
ECHA InfoCard	100.000.700
EC Number	200-769-4
PubChem CID	6285
RTECS number	BS5950000
UNII	0435621Z3N
CompTox Dashboard (EPA)	DTXSID9044457
- InChI: InChI=1S/C8H20N.BrH/c1-5-9(6-2,7-3)8-4;/h5-8H2,1-4H3;1H/q+1;/p-1 Key: HWCKGOZZJDHMNC-UHFFFAOYSA-M; InChI=1/C8H20N.BrH/c1-5-9(6-2,7-3)8-4;/h5-8H2,1-4H3;1H/q+1;/p-1 Key: HWCKGOZZJDHMNC-REWHXWOFAM
- SMILES: [Br-].CC[N+](CC)(CC)CC

Properties
Chemical formula	C_{8}H_{20}NBr
Molar mass	210.16 g/mol
Appearance	White solid
Density	1.4 g/cm^{3}
Melting point	286 °C (547 °F; 559 K) (decomposes)
Solubility in water	Soluble

Hazards
- GHS labelling
Pictograms	(GHS07: Exclamation mark)
Signal word	Warning
Hazard statements	H302, H315, H319, H335
Precautionary statements	P261, P264, P270, P271, P280, P301+P312, P302+P352, P304+P340, P305+P351+P338, P312, P330, P332+P313, P337+P313, P362, P403+P233, P405, P501
Safety data sheet (SDS)	External MSDS
- Except where otherwise noted, data are given for materials in their standard state (at 25 °C [77 °F], 100 kPa). verify (what is ?) Infobox references

Tetraethylammonium bromide (TEAB) is a quaternary ammonium compound with the chemical formula C_{8}H_{20}N^{+}Br^{−}, often written as "Et_{4}N^{+}Br^{−}" in the chemical literature. It has been used as the source of tetraethylammonium ions in pharmacological and physiological studies, but is also used in organic chemical synthesis.

== Chemistry ==
=== Synthesis ===
TEAB is commercially available, but can be prepared by the reaction between tetraethylammonium hydroxide and hydrobromic acid:

Et_{4}N^{+}HO^{−} + HBr → Et_{4}N^{+}Br^{−} + H_{2}O

Evaporation of the water and recrystallization from acetonitrile yields a crystalline sample of TEAB.

=== Structure ===
The crystal structure of TEAB has been determined and found to exhibit a distorted tetrahedral symmetry with respect to the geometry of the C atoms around the central N.

=== Synthetic applications ===
Examples include:

- TEAB catalyzes the high-yield oxidation of organic sulfides to sulfoxides by o-iodoxybenzoic acid (IBX) in chloroform/water at room temperature, e.g.

(C_{2}H_{5})_{2}S → (C_{2}H_{5})_{2}S=O

- TEAB has been used for the in situ preparation of tetraethylammonium superoxide from potassium superoxide for the conversion of primary alkyl halides to dialkyl peroxides. The overall reaction is:

2R^{1}Br + 2KO_{2} → R^{1}-O-O-R^{1} + 2KBr + O_{2}

== Biology ==
In common with tetraethylammonium chloride and tetraethylammonium iodide, TEAB has been used as a source of tetraethylammonium ions for numerous clinical and pharmacological studies, which are covered in more detail under the entry for tetraethylammonium. Briefly, TEAB has been explored clinically for its ganglionic blocking properties, although it is now essentially obsolete as a drug, and it is still used in physiological research for its ability to block K^{+} channels in various tissues.

== Toxicity ==
The toxicity of TEAB is primarily due to the tetraethylammonium ion, which has been studied extensively. The acute toxicity of TEAB is comparable to that of tetraethylammonium chloride and tetraethylammonium iodide. These data, taken from a study by Randall and co-workers, are provided for comparative purposes; additional details may be found in the entry for Tetraethylammonium.

LD_{50} for mouse: 38 mg/kg, i.v.; 60 mg/kg, i.p.; >2000 mg/kg, p.o.

== See also ==
- Tetraethylammonium
- Tetraethylammonium chloride
- Tetraethylammonium iodide
