= Tetraethylammonium =

Polyatomic ion (N(C2H5)4, charge +1)

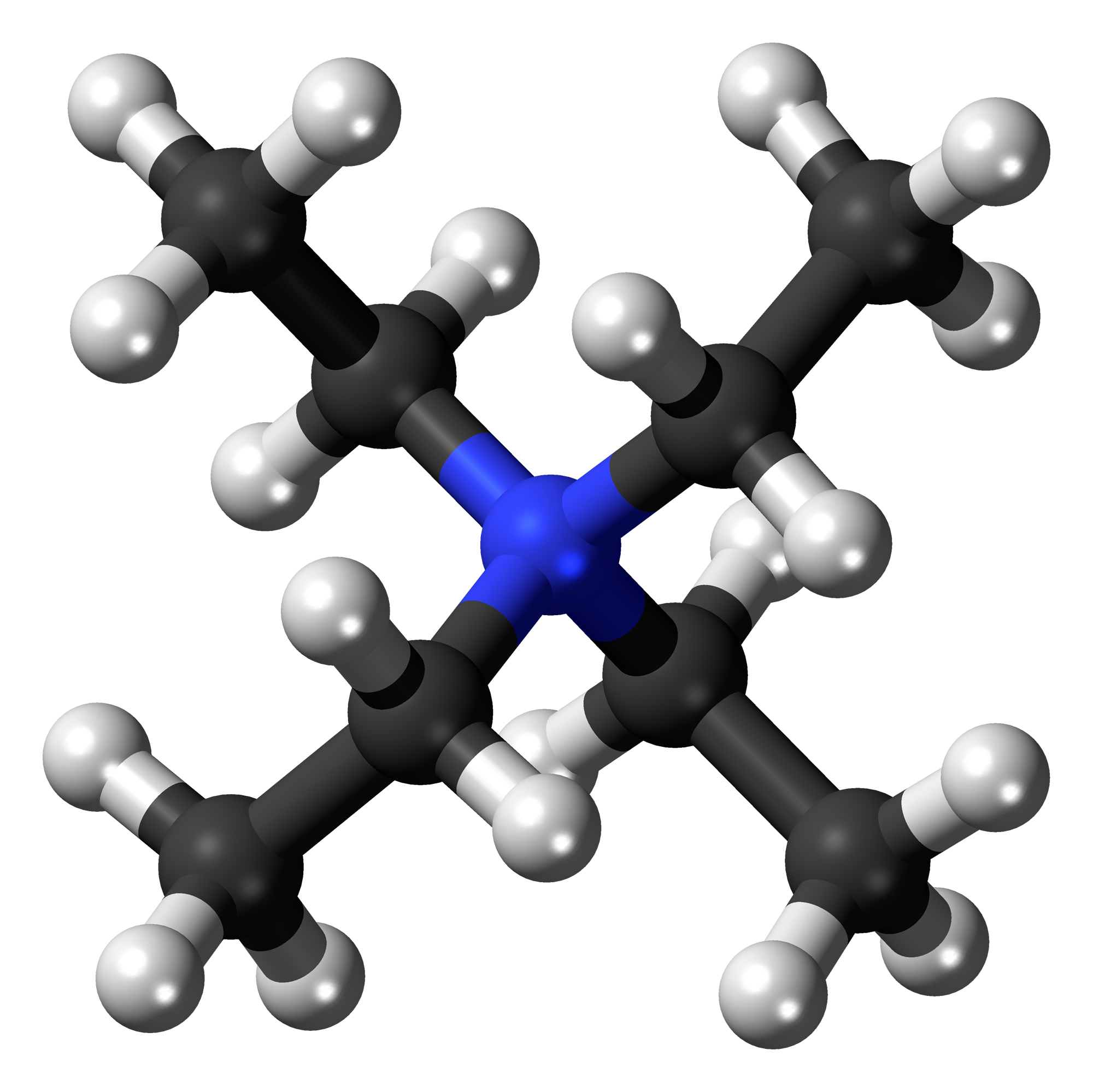

Names
- Preferred IUPAC name N,N,N-Triethylethanaminium
- Other names Tetraethylazanium

Identifiers
CAS Number	66-40-0
3D model (JSmol)	Interactive image
ChEBI	CHEBI:44296
ChEMBL	ChEMBL9324
ChemSpider	5220
IUPHAR/BPS	2343
PubChem CID	5413
UNII	5AV7G7EIEE
CompTox Dashboard (EPA)	DTXSID2045024
- InChI: InChI=1S/C8H20N/c1-5-9(6-2,7-3)8-4/h5-8H2,1-4H3/q+1 Key: CBXCPBUEXACCNR-UHFFFAOYSA-N; InChI=1/C8H20N/c1-5-9(6-2,7-3)8-4/h5-8H2,1-4H3/q+1 Key: CBXCPBUEXACCNR-UHFFFAOYAM
- SMILES: CC[N+](CC)(CC)CC

Properties
Chemical formula	C_{8}H_{20}N^{+}
Molar mass	130.25 g/mol
- Except where otherwise noted, data are given for materials in their standard state (at 25 °C [77 °F], 100 kPa). verify (what is ?) Infobox references

Tetraethylammonium (TEA) is a quaternary ammonium cation with the chemical formula [(CH_{3}CH_{2})_{4}N]^{+}, consisting of four ethyl groups (−CH_{2}CH_{3} or −C_{2}H_{5}, often abbreviated as −Et) attached to a central nitrogen atom. It is a counterion used in the research laboratory to prepare lipophilic salts of inorganic anions. It is used similarly to tetrabutylammonium, the difference being that its salts are less lipophilic, more easily crystallized and more toxic.

Tetraethylammonium is a potassium channel blocker. It inhibits the return to the resting potential of action potentials in neurons by binding to the voltage-gated potassium channels in nerve cell membranes and blocking the passage of potassium ions (responsible for the repolarization of an action potential) out of the neuron.

== Preparation ==
The halide salt is prepared by the reaction of triethylamine and an ethyl halide:

(CH_{3}CH_{2})_{3}N + CH_{3}CH_{2}X → [(CH_{3}CH_{2})_{4}N]^{+}X^{−}

This method works well for the preparation of tetraethylammonium iodide (where X = I).

Most tetraethylammonium salts are prepared by salt metathesis reactions. For example, the synthesis of tetraethylammonium perchlorate, a salt that has been useful as a supporting electrolyte for polarographic studies in non-aqueous solvents, is carried out by mixing the water-soluble salts tetraethylammonium bromide and sodium perchlorate in water, from which the water-insoluble tetraethylammonium perchlorate precipitates:

[(CH_{3}CH_{2})_{4}N]^{+}Br^{−}(aq) + Na^{+}[ClO_{4}]^{−}(aq) → Na^{+}Br^{−}(aq) + [(CH_{3}CH_{2})_{4}N]^{+}[ClO_{4}]^{−}(s)

Other examples include tetraethylammonium cyanide ([(CH_{3}CH_{2})_{4}N]^{+}CN^{−}), and trichlorostannate ([(CH_{3}CH_{2})_{4}N]^{+}[SnCl_{3}]^{−}). In some cases, salts are produced of anions that cannot be generated in water, such as tetraethylammonium tetrachloronickelate(II) salt ([(CH_{3}CH_{2})_{4}N]^{+})_{2}[NiCl_{4}]^{2−}, with the tetrahedral [NiCl_{4}]^{2−} anion.

=== Uses ===
The principal chemical characteristic of tetraethylammonium salts is their ability to engage in processes involving phase-transfer, such as phase-transfer catalysis. Typically, the four ethyl groups surrounding the nitrogen are too small to facilitate efficient ion transfer between aqueous and organic phases, but tetraethylammonium salts have been found to be effective in a number of such applications, and these are exemplified under the headings of the individual salts.

TEA salts such as tetraethylammonium tetrafluoroborate and tetraethylammonium methylsulfonate are used in supercapacitors as organic electrolytes.

TEA halide and its hydroxide are used for the synthesis of high-silica zeolite, especially for the zeolite beta. TEA can act as a template for micropore of zeolites under hydrothermal conditions during crystallization processes.

=== Properties ===
The effective radius of the tetraethylammonium ion is reported as ~0.45 nm, which is comparable in size to that of the hydrated K^{+} ion. The ionic radius for TEA is given as 0.385 nm; several thermodynamic parameters for the TEA ion are also recorded.

The octanol-water partition coefficient of TEA iodide, P_{o-w} was determined experimentally to be 6.9×10^{−4} (or log P ≈ −3.16).

== Biology ==
=== Pharmacology ===
The literature dealing with the pharmacologically-related properties of tetraethylammonium is vast, and research continues. It is clear that TEA blocks autonomic ganglia - it was the first "ganglionic blocker" drug to be introduced into clinical practice. However, TEA also produces effects at the neuromuscular junction and at sympathetic nerve terminals.

At the mechanistic level, TEA has long been known to block voltage-dependent K^{+} channels in nerve, and it is thought that this action is involved in the effects of TEA at sympathetic nerve terminals. With respect to activity at the neuromuscular junction, TEA has been found to be a competitive inhibitor at nicotinic acetylcholine receptors, although the details of its effect on these receptor proteins are complex. TEA also blocks Ca^{2+} - activated K^{+} channels, such as those found in skeletal muscle and pituitary cells. It has also been reported that TEA inhibits aquaporin (APQ) channels, but this still seems to be a disputed issue.

A partial effect of these voltage-dependent and permeability properties within each system mentioned above is not only due to the aforementioned inhibitory properties of TEA, but also its ability to inhibit Na,K-ATPase. Acting on the extracellular vestibule of the Na,K-ATPase, inhibiting K+ access similar to ouabain, TEA further accentuates the disrupted K, and Na, gradients within each of these systems.

=== Clinical considerations ===
Although TEA (sometimes under the name "Etamon") was explored in a number of different clinical applications, including the treatment of hypertension, its major use seems to have been as a probe to assess the capacity for vasodilation in cases of peripheral vascular disease. Because of dangerous, even fatal reactions in some patients, as well as inconsistent cardiovascular responses, TEA was soon replaced by other drugs.

TEA is not orally active. Typical symptoms produced in humans include the following: dry mouth, suppression of gastric secretion, drastic reduction of gastric motility, paralysis of urinary bladder, and relief of some forms of pain. Most studies with TEA seem to have been performed using either its chloride or bromide salt without comment as to any distinctions in effect, but Birchall and his co-workers preferred the use of TEA chloride in order to avoid the sedative effects of the bromide ion.

=== Toxicology ===
An extensive study of the toxicology of tetraethylammonium chloride in mice, rats and dogs was published by Gruhzit and co-workers in 1948. These workers reported the following symptoms in mice and rats receiving toxic parenteral doses: tremors, incoordination, flaccid prostration, and death from respiratory failure within 10–30 minutes; dogs exhibited similar symptoms, including incoordination, flaccid prostration, respiratory and cardiac depression, ptosis, mydriasis, erythema, and death from respiratory paralysis and circulatory collapse. After non-lethal doses, symptoms abated within 15–60 minutes. There was little evidence of toxicity from chronic administration of non-lethal doses. These investigators recorded the following acute toxicities, as LD_{50}s for TEA chloride (error ranges not shown):

Mouse: 65 mg/kg, i.p.; 900 mg/kg, p.o.

Rat: ~56 mg/kg, i.v.; 110 mg/kg, i.m.; 2630 mg/kg, p.o.

Dog: ~36 mg/kg, i.v.; 58 mg/kg, i.m.

Another research group, working at about the same time, but using tetraethylammonium bromide, published the following LD_{50} data:

Mouse: 38 mg/kg, i.v.; 60 mg/kg, i.p.; >2000 mg/kg, p.o.

Rat: 63 mg/kg, i.v.; 115 mg/kg, i.p.

Dog: 55 mg/kg, i.v.

Rabbit: 72 mg/kg, i.v.

Writing in 1950, Graham made some observations on the toxic effects of tetraethylammonium bromide in humans. In one subject, described as a "healthy woman", 300 mg of tetraethylammonium bromide, i.v., produced incapacitating "curariform" (i.e., resembling the effects of tubocurarine) paralysis of the skeletal muscles, as well as marked drowsiness. These effects were largely dissipated within 2 hours. Citing the work of other investigators, Graham noted that Birchall had also produced "alarming curariform effects" in humans with i.v. doses of 32 mg/kg of tetraethylammonium chloride.

== See also ==
- Tetraethylammonium bromide
- Tetraethylammonium chloride
- Tetraethylammonium iodide
