= Tetra-n-butylammonium iodide =

Names
- Preferred IUPAC name N,N,N-Tributylbutan-1-aminium iodide
- Other names TBAI

Identifiers
CAS Number	311-28-4
3D model (JSmol)	Interactive image
ChemSpider	60875
ECHA InfoCard	100.005.656
EC Number	206-220-5
PubChem CID	329769349
UNII	6M53DT4JNG
CompTox Dashboard (EPA)	DTXSID30878092
- InChI: InChI=1S/C16H36N.HI/c1-5-9-13-17(14-10-6-2,15-11-7-3)16-12-8-4;/h5-16H2,1-4H3;1H/q+1;/p-1 Key: DPKBAXPHAYBPRL-UHFFFAOYSA-M; InChI=1S/C16H36N.HI/c1-5-9-13-17(14-10-6-2,15-11-7-3)16-12-8-4;/h5-16H2,1-4H3;1H/q+1;/p-1
- SMILES: [I-].CCCC[N+](CCCC)(CCCC)CCCC

Properties
Chemical formula	C_{16}H_{36}IN
Molar mass	369.3716 g/mol
Appearance	White powder
Melting point	147 °C (297 °F; 420 K)

Hazards
- Occupational safety and health (OHS/OSH)
Main hazards	Harmful

Related compounds
Other anions	Tetrabutylammonium bromide, Tetrabutylammonium chloride, Tetrabutylammonium fluoride, Tetrabutylammonium hydroxide
- Except where otherwise noted, data are given for materials in their standard state (at 25 °C [77 °F], 100 kPa). Infobox references

Tetra-n-butylammonium iodide (TBAI) is a quaternary ammonium salt with an iodide counterion. It is used for synthesizing tetra-n-butylammonium triiodide by mixing with iodine. TBAI is also commonly used as a catalyst for the protection of alcohols as benzyl ethers with benzyl bromide.

== Properties ==
The solid crystal of tetra-n-butylammonium iodide is in the monoclinic crystal system. It has space group C2/c. The unit cell has dimensions a=14.2806 b=14.1864 c=19.5951 β=111.149. There are eight formulae in the unit cell (Z=8), which has volume 3702.4 Å^{3}.

The enthalpy of formation Δ_{f}H^{0} of tetra-n-butylammonium iodide is −499 kJ/mol, which is lower than that for the bromide or chloride (−540, −564 kJ/mol).

At lower temperatures with water tetra-n-butylammonium iodide forms a clathrate hydrate. The tetra-n-butylammonium cation is large and hydrophobic. The absolute enthalpy of hydration (from gas phase) is −260 kJ/mol.

The He(I) photoelectron spectrum of tetra-n-butylammonium iodide contains a peak at 11 eV due to the tetra-n-butylammonium cation, and at 7 and 8 eV due to iodide.

== See also ==
- Iodide
- Tetrabutylammonium triiodide
