= Tetrabutylammonium =

Polyatomic ion (N(C4H9)4, charge +1)

Names
- Preferred IUPAC name N,N,N-Tributylbutan-1-aminium
- Other names Tetrabutylammonium; Tetrabutylazanium

Identifiers
CAS Number	10549-76-5
3D model (JSmol)	Interactive image
ChEBI	CHEBI:45825
ChEMBL	ChEMBL1236196
ChemSpider	15220
DrugBank	DB01851
PubChem CID	16028
UNII	CBU2X6BBJR
CompTox Dashboard (EPA)	DTXSID3045011
- InChI: InChI=1S/C16H36N/c1-5-9-13-17(14-10-6-2,15-11-7-3)16-12-8-4/h5-16H2,1-4H3/q+1 Key: DZLFLBLQUQXARW-UHFFFAOYSA-N
- SMILES: CCCC[N+](CCCC)(CCCC)CCCC

Properties
Chemical formula	C_{16}H_{36}N^{+}
Molar mass	242.470 g·mol^{−1}

Related compounds
Related compounds	tetrabutylammonium fluoride tetrabutylammonium bromide tetrabutylammonium hydroxide tetrabutylammonium hydroxide tetrabutylammonium hexafluorophosphate
- Except where otherwise noted, data are given for materials in their standard state (at 25 °C [77 °F], 100 kPa). Infobox references

Tetrabutylammonium is a quaternary ammonium cation with the formula [N(C_{4}H_{9})_{4}]^{+}, also denoted [NBu_{4}]^{+} (where Bu = butyl group). It is used in the research laboratory to prepare lipophilic salts of inorganic anions. Relative to tetraethylammonium derivatives, tetrabutylammonium salts are more lipophilic but crystallize less readily. It is useful for phase-transfer catalysis.

== Derivatives ==
Some tetrabutylammonium salts of simple anions include:

- tetrabutylammonium fluoride, a desilylation reagent.
- tetrabutylammonium bromide, a precursor to other tetrabutylammonium salts via salt metathesis reactions.
- tetrabutylammonium iodide, a low cost catalyst.
- tetrabutylammonium triiodide, a common carrier of the triiodide anion used in chemical synthesis.
- tetrabutylammonium hydroxide, a precursor to other tetrabutylammonium salts via acid-base reactions.
- tetrabutylammonium hexafluorophosphate, an electrolyte for nonaqueous electrochemistry.

Some tetrabutylammonium salts of more complex examples include:

- polyoxometalates.
- NS^{−}_{4}.
- metal carbonyl anions.
- Synthetic iron-sulfur clusters such as [Fe_{4}S_{4}(SPh)_{4}]^{2−}
- Octachlorodirhenate ([Re_{2}Cl_{8}]^{2−}).

== See also ==
- N-Butyllithium
