= Tetrabutylammonium chloride =

Quaternary ammonium salt of chloride

Identifiers
CAS Number	1112-67-0; 37451-68-6 Hydrate
3D model (JSmol)	Interactive image
Beilstein Reference	3571227
ChEBI	CHEBI:51988
ChEMBL	ChEMBL1078612
ChemSpider	63847
ECHA InfoCard	100.012.905
EC Number	214-195-7
Gmelin Reference	10839
PubChem CID	70681
CompTox Dashboard (EPA)	DTXSID10883644
- InChI: InChI=1S/C16H36N.ClH/c1-5-9-13-17(14-10-6-2,15-11-7-3)16-12-8-4;/h5-16H2,1-4H3;1H/q+1;/p-1 Key: NHGXDBSUJJNIRV-UHFFFAOYSA-M
- SMILES: CCCC[N+](CCCC)(CCCC)CCCC.[Cl-]

Properties
Chemical formula	[(CH_{3}CH_{2}CH_{2}CH_{2})_{4}N]Cl
Molar mass	277.92 g·mol^{−1}
Appearance	White crystalline solid
Density	1.018 g/cm^{3}
Melting point	90 °C (194 °F; 363 K)
Solubility in water	Soluble

Hazards
- GHS labelling
Pictograms	(GHS07: Exclamation mark)
Signal word	Warning
Hazard statements	H315, H319, H335
Precautionary statements	P261, P264, P271, P280, P302+P352, P304+P340, P305+P351+P338, P312, P321, P332+P313, P337+P313, P362, P403+P233, P405, P501

Related compounds
Related compounds	Tetramethylammonium chloride; Tetraethylammonium chloride; Tetrapropylammonium chloride
- Except where otherwise noted, data are given for materials in their standard state (at 25 °C [77 °F], 100 kPa). Infobox references

Tetrabutylammonium chloride is the organic compound with the chemical formula [(CH_{3}CH_{2}CH_{2}CH_{2})_{4}N]Cl, often abbreviated as [Bu_{4}N]Cl, where Bu stands for n-butyl. It is a white crystalline solid. It is soluble in water. It is a quaternary ammonium salt. It consists of tetrabutylammonium cations [(CH_{3}CH_{2}CH_{2}CH_{2})_{4}N]^{+} and chloride anions Cl^{−}.

It sees use as a phase-transfer catalyst, although it is less popular that the corresponding bromine salt TBAB. It can also undergo salt metathesis reactions to form a variety of other tetrabutylammonium salts. Often tetrabutylammonium bromide is preferred as a source of tetrabutylammonium because it is less hygroscopic than the chloride.
