= Tetrabutylammonium bromide =

Tetra-n-butylammonium bromide

Names
- Preferred IUPAC name N,N,N-Tributylbutan-1-aminium bromide
- Other names: Tetra-n-butylammonium bromide; TBAB

Identifiers
CAS Number	1643-19-2
3D model (JSmol)	Interactive image
ChEBI	CHEBI:51993
ChEMBL	ChEMBL60696
ChemSpider	66843
ECHA InfoCard	100.015.182
EC Number	216-699-2
PubChem CID	74236
UNII	VJZ168I98R
CompTox Dashboard (EPA)	DTXSID4044400
- InChI: InChI=1S/C16H36N.BrH/c1-5-9-13-17(14-10-6-2,15-11-7-3)16-12-8-4;/h5-16H2,1-4H3;1H/q+1;/p-1 Key: JRMUNVKIHCOMHV-UHFFFAOYSA-M; InChI=1/C16H36N.BrH/c1-5-9-13-17(14-10-6-2,15-11-7-3)16-12-8-4;/h5-16H2,1-4H3;1H/q+1;/p-1 Key: JRMUNVKIHCOMHV-REWHXWOFAC
- SMILES: [Br-].CCCC[N+](CCCC)(CCCC)CCCC

Properties
Chemical formula	C_{16}H_{36}BrN
Molar mass	322.368 g/mol
Appearance	White solid
Density	1.18 g/cm^{3}
Melting point	125 °C (257 °F; 398 K) Decomposes at 133°C
Solubility in water	600 g/L (20 °C)
Solubility	Soluble in dichloromethane and ethanol, slightly soluble in toluene

Hazards
- Occupational safety and health (OHS/OSH)
Main hazards	Harmful
- GHS labelling
Pictograms	(GHS07: Exclamation mark) (GHS09: Environmental hazard)
Signal word	Warning
Hazard statements	H302, H315, H319, H335, H411, H412
Precautionary statements	P261, P264, P270, P271, P273, P280, P301+P312, P302+P352, P304+P340, P305+P351+P338, P312, P321, P330, P332+P313, P337+P313, P362, P391, P403+P233, P405, P501

Related compounds
Other anions	Tetrabutylammonium tribromide, Tetra-n-butylammonium fluoride, Tetrabutylammonium chloride, Tetra-n-butylammonium iodide, Tetrabutylammonium hydroxide
Other cations	Tetramethylammonium bromide, Tetraethylammonium bromide
- Except where otherwise noted, data are given for materials in their standard state (at 25 °C [77 °F], 100 kPa). verify (what is ?) Infobox references

Tetrabutylammonium bromide (TBAB) is a quaternary ammonium salt with a bromide commonly used as a phase transfer catalyst. It is used to prepare many other tetrabutylammonium salts by salt metathesis reactions. The anhydrous form is a white solid.

In addition to being cheap, tetrabutylammonium bromide is also environmentally friendly, has a greater degree of selectivity, is operationally simple, non-corrosive, and can be recycled easily as well.

== Preparation and reactions ==
Tetrabutylammonium bromide can be prepared by the alkylation of tributylamine with 1-bromobutane.

Tetrabutylammonium bromide is used to prepare other salts of the tetrabutylammonium cation by salt metathesis reactions.

It serves as a source of bromide ions for substitution reactions. It is a commonly used phase transfer catalyst. As its melting point is just over 100 °C and decreases in the presence of other reagents, it can be considered an ionic liquid.

=== Role in semi-clathrate formation ===
TBAB is being extensively studied as a thermodynamic promoter in the formation of semi-clathrate hydrates which greatly brings down the pressure - temperature requirement for forming gas hydrates.

== See also ==
- Tetrabutylammonium tribromide, with an additional Br_{2} unit
- Tetrabutylammonium fluoride
- Tetrabutylammonium chloride
- Tetrabutylammonium iodide
