= Counterion =

Ion which negates another oppositely-charged ion in an ionic molecule

Polystyrene sulfonate, a cation-exchange resin, is typically supplied with Na^{+} as the counterion.

In chemistry, a counterion (sometimes written as "counter ion", pronounced as such) is the ion that accompanies an ionic species in order to maintain electric neutrality. In table salt (NaCl, also known as sodium chloride) the sodium ion (positively charged) is the counterion for the chloride ion (negatively charged) and vice versa.

A counterion will be more commonly referred to as an anion or a cation, depending on whether it is negatively or positively charged. Thus, the counterion to an anion will be a cation, and vice versa.

In biochemistry, counterions are generally vaguely defined. Depending on their charge, proteins are associated with a variety of smaller anions and cations. In plant cells, the anion malate is often accumulated in the vacuole to decrease water potential and drive cell expansion. To maintain neutrality, K^{+} ions are often accumulated as the counterion. Ion permeation through hydrophobic cell walls is mediated by ion transport channels. Nucleic acids are anionic, the corresponding cations are often protonated polyamines.

== Interfacial chemistry ==
Counterions are the mobile ions in ion exchange polymers and colloids. Ion-exchange resins are polymers with a net negative or positive charge. Cation-exchange resins consist of an anionic polymer with countercations, typically Na^{+} (sodium). The resin has a higher affinity for highly charged countercations, for example by Ca^{2+} (calcium) in the case of water softening. Correspondingly, anion-exchange resins are typically provided in the form of chloride Cl^{−}, which is a highly mobile counteranion.

Counterions are used in phase-transfer catalysis. In a typical application lipophilic countercation such as benzalkonium solubilizes reagents in organic solvents.

== Solution chemistry ==
Solubility of salts in organic solvents is a function of both the cation and the anion. The solubility of cations in organic solvents can be enhanced when the anion is lipophilic. Similarly, the solubility of anions in organic solvents is enhanced with lipophilic cations. The most common lipophilic cations are quaternary ammonium cations, called "quat salts".

Lipophilic counteranions

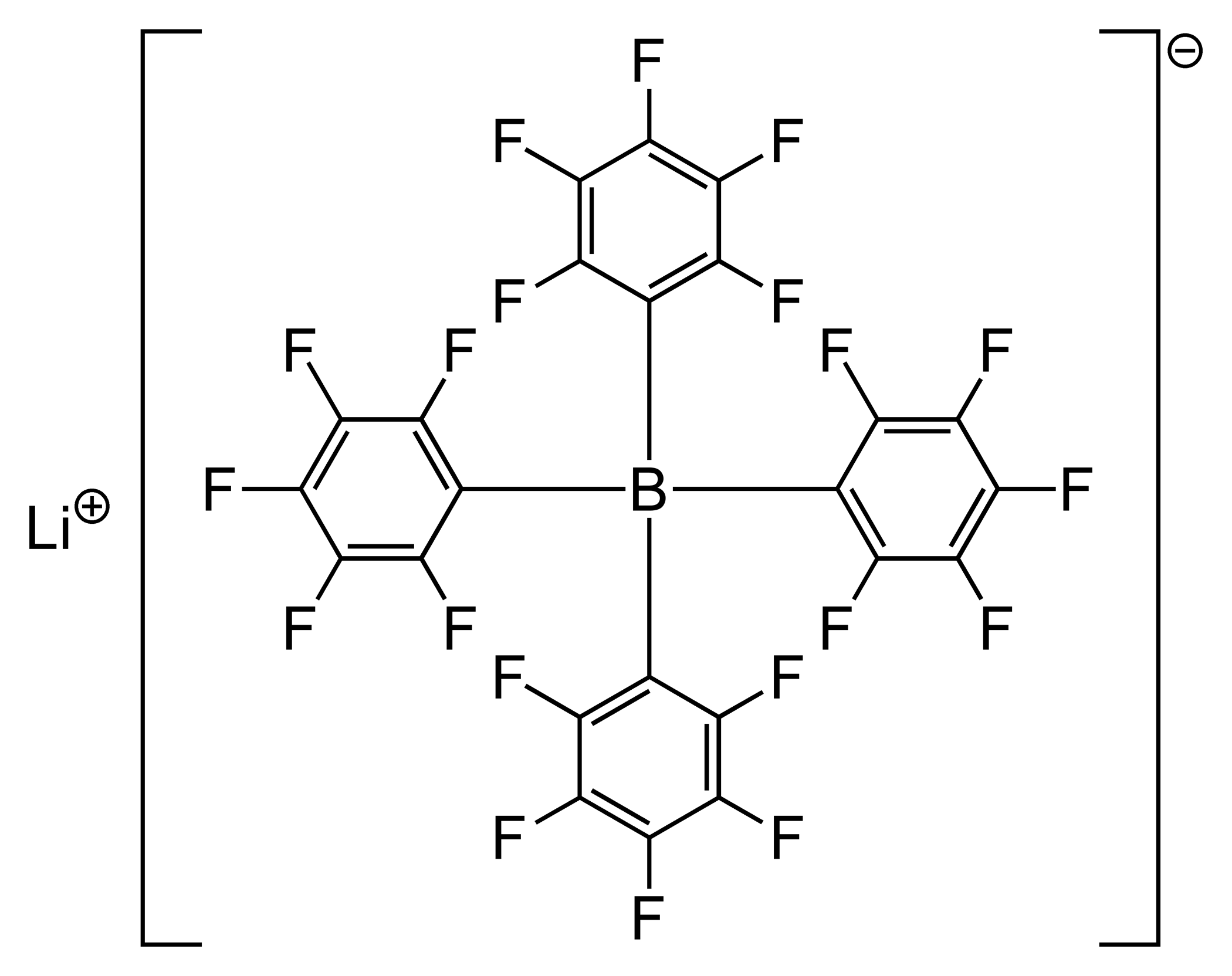
Lithium tetrakis(pentafluorophenyl)borate is the lithium salt of a highly lipophilic tetraarylborate anion, often referred to as a weakly coordinating anion.

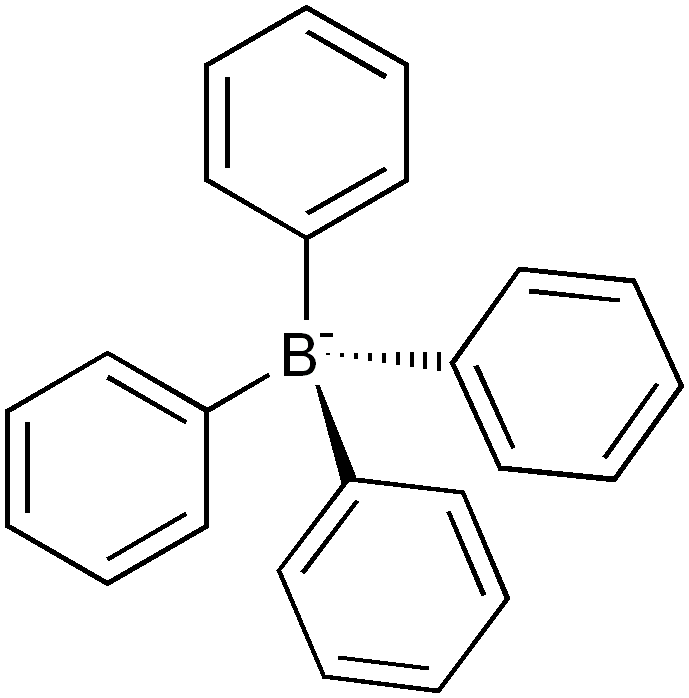
Tetraphenylborate is less lipophilic than the perfluorinated derivative, but widely used as a precipitating agent.

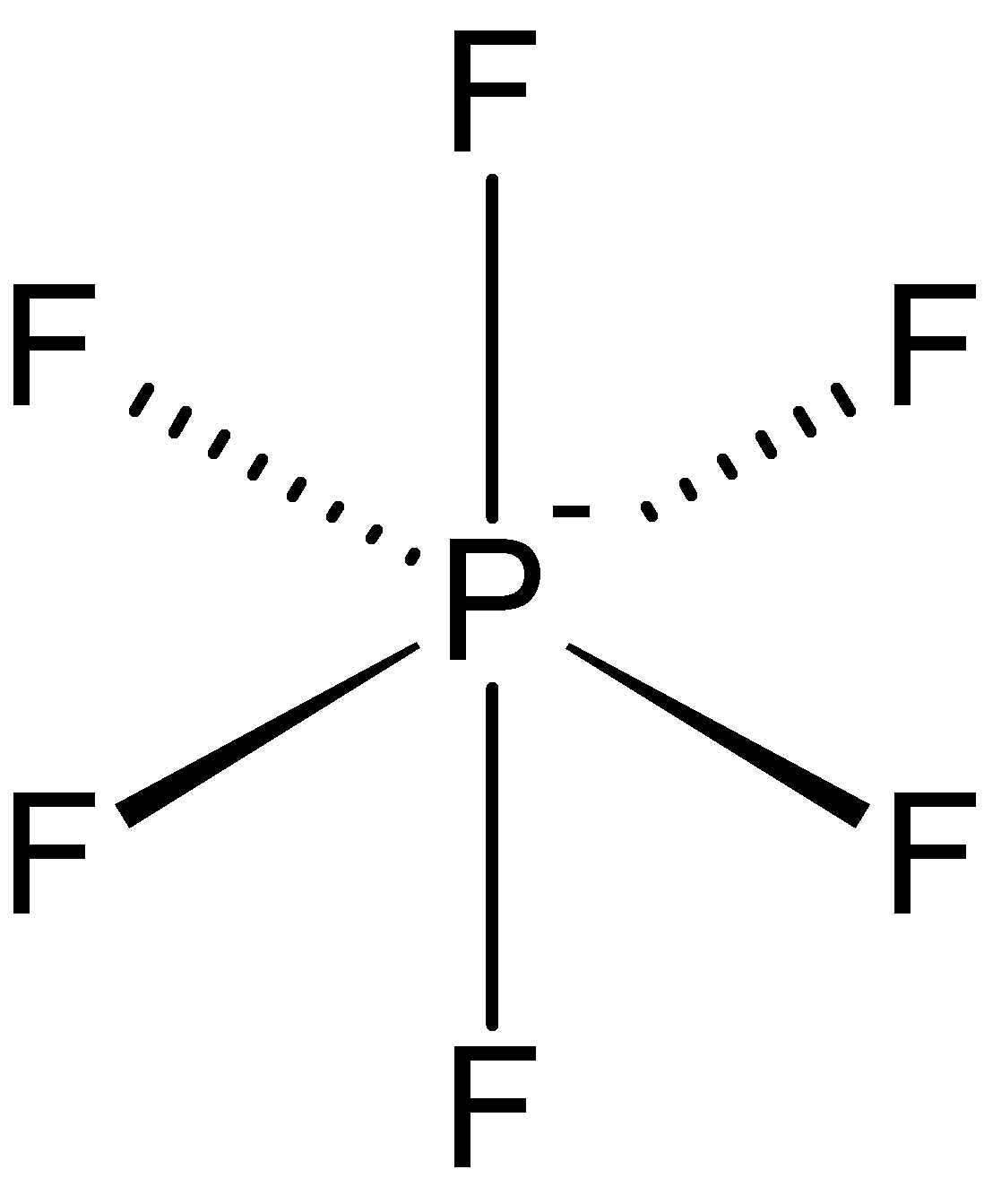
Hexafluorophosphate is a common weakly coordinating anion.

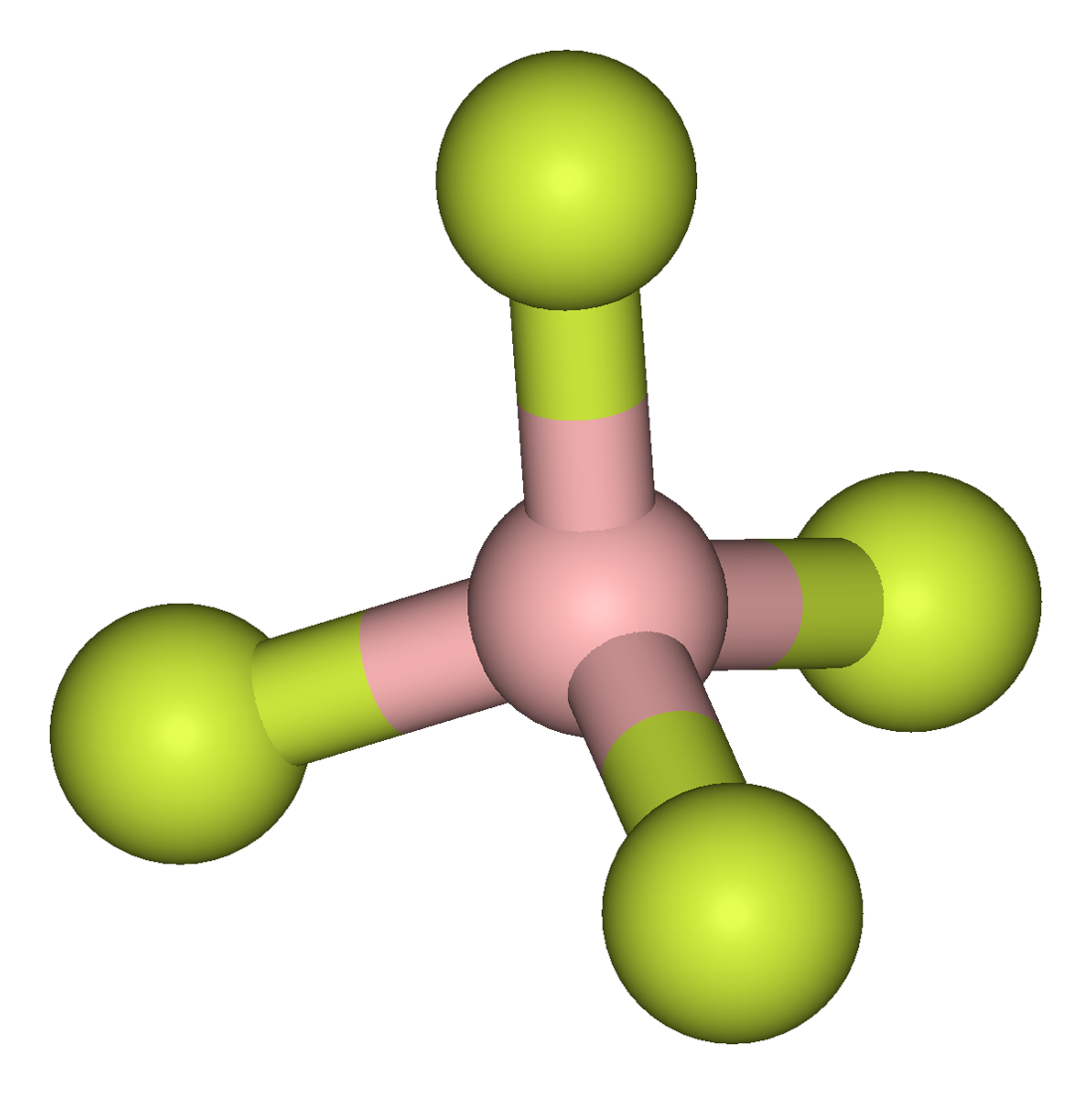
As illustrated by the small counteranion tetrafluoroborate (BF^{−}_{4}), lipophilic anions tend to be symmetric and singly charged.
Lipophilic countercations

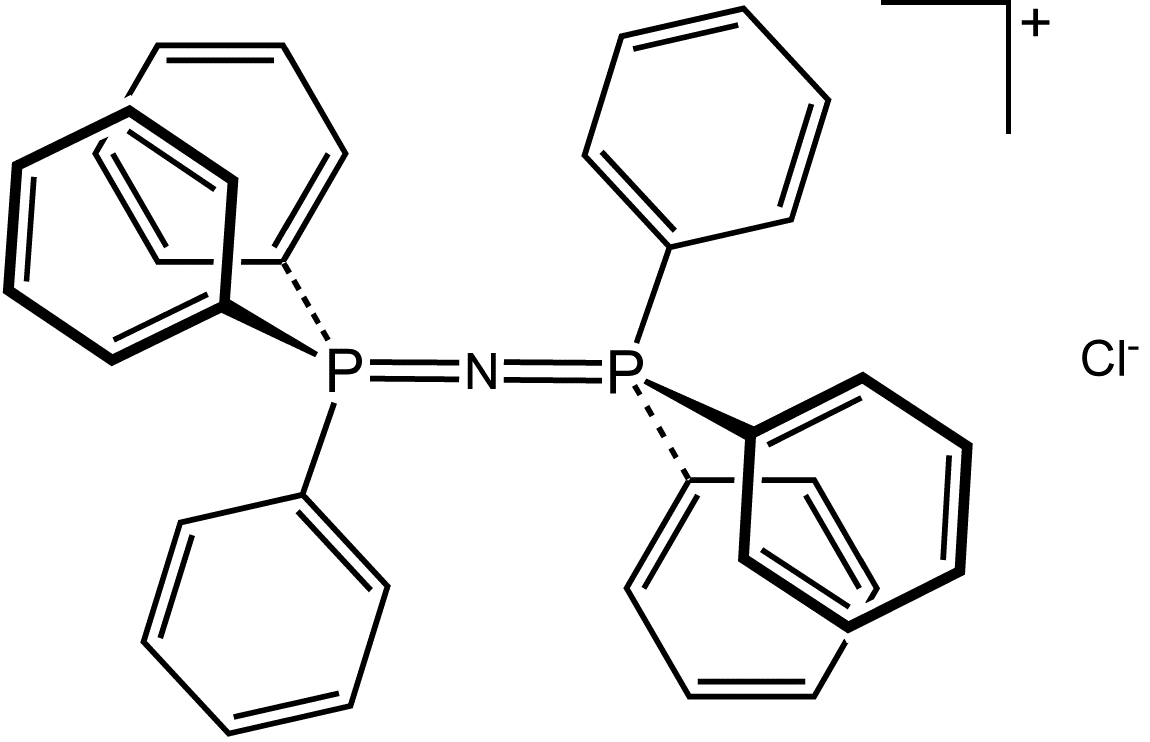
Bis(triphenylphosphine)iminium chloride is the chloride salt of a bulky lipophilic phosphonium cation [Ph_{3}PNPPh_{3}]^{+}.

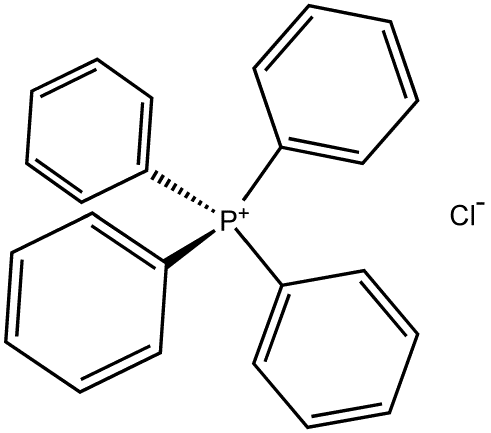
Tetraphenylphosphonium chloride (C_{6}H_{5})_{4}PCl, abbreviated Ph_{4}PCl or PPh_{4}Cl is the chloride of a symmetrical phosphonium cation that is often used in organometallic chemistry. The arsonium salt is also well known.

The bromide salt of tetrabutylammonium, one of the most common counter cations. Many analogous "quat salts" are known.

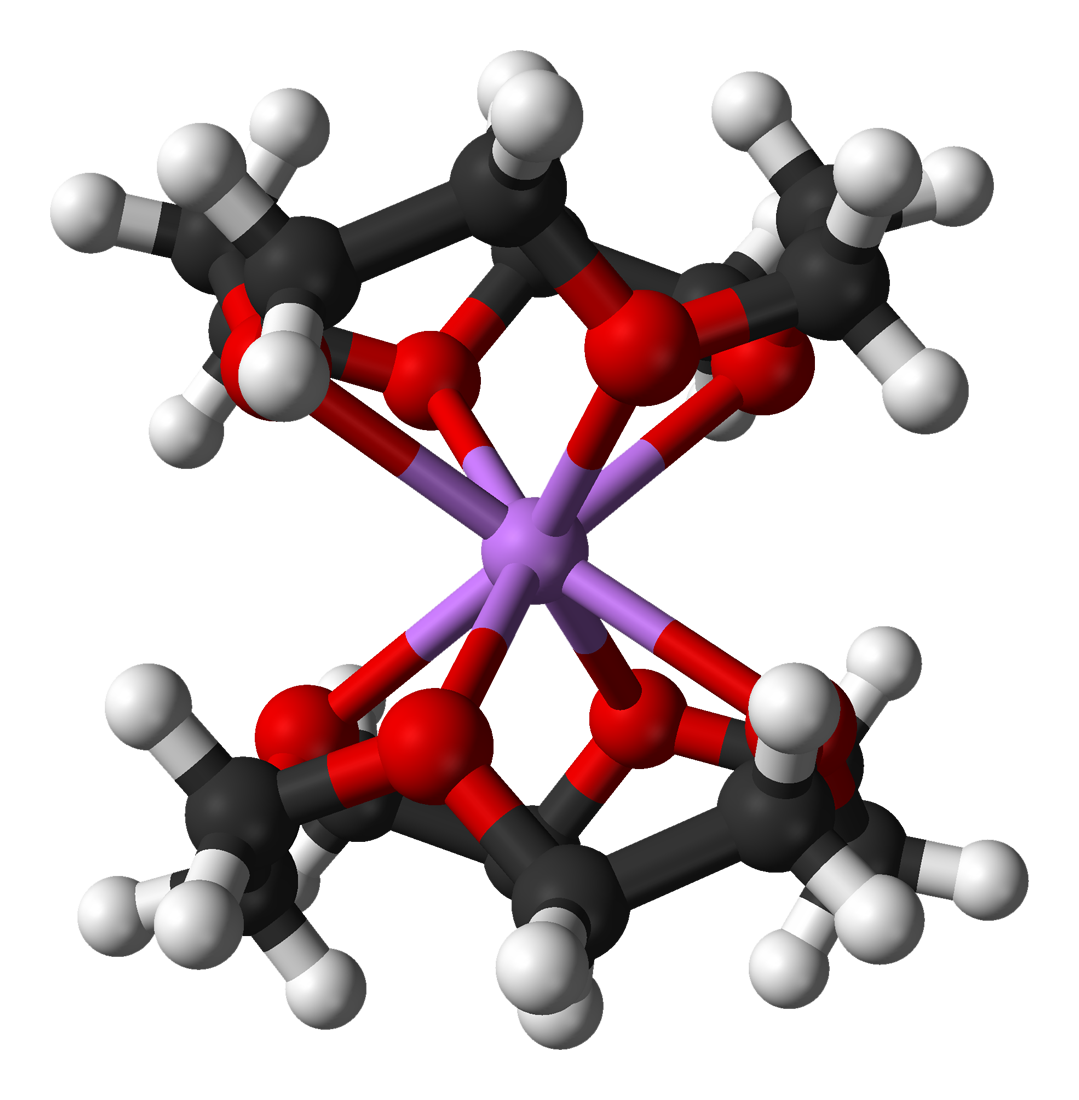
Alkali metal cations bound by crown ethers are common lipophilic countercations, as illustrated by [Li(12-crown-4)_{2}]^{+}.

Many cationic organometallic complexes are isolated with inert, noncoordinating counterions. Ferrocenium tetrafluoroborate is one such example.

== Electrochemistry ==
In order to achieve high ionic conductivity, electrochemical measurements are conducted in the presence of excess electrolyte. In water the electrolyte is often a simple salt such as potassium chloride. For measurements in nonaqueous solutions, salts composed of both lipophilic cations and anions are employed, e.g., tetrabutylammonium hexafluorophosphate. Even in such cases potentials are influenced by ion-pairing, an effect that is accentuated in solvents of low dielectric constant.

== Counterion stability ==
For many applications, the counterion simply provides charge and lipophilicity that allows manipulation of its partner ion. The counterion is expected to be chemically inert. For counteranions, inertness is expressed in terms of low Lewis basicity. The counterions are ideally rugged and unreactive. For quaternary ammonium and phosphonium countercations, inertness is related to their resistance of degradation by strong bases and strong nucleophiles.
