= Quinoline methiodide =

Names
- Preferred IUPAC name 1-Methylquinolin-1-ium iodide

Identifiers
CAS Number	3947-76-0
3D model (JSmol)	Interactive image
ChemSpider	18697
PubChem CID	19848
UNII	3743X5VE2U
CompTox Dashboard (EPA)	DTXSID40960098
- InChI: InChI=1S/C10H10N.HI/c1-11-8-4-6-9-5-2-3-7-10(9)11;/h2-8H,1H3;1H/q+1;/p-1 Key: PNYRDWUKTXFTPN-UHFFFAOYSA-M
- SMILES: C[N+]1=CC=CC2=CC=CC=C21.[I-]

Properties
Chemical formula	C_{10}H_{10}IN
Molar mass	271.101 g·mol^{−1}

Hazards
- Lethal dose or concentration (LD, LC)
LD_{50} (median dose)	56 mg/kg (mouse, intravenous)
LD_{Lo} (lowest published)	300 mg/kg (rabbit, subcutaneous)
- Except where otherwise noted, data are given for materials in their standard state (at 25 °C [77 °F], 100 kPa). Infobox references

Quinoline methiodide is a quaternary ammonium compound produced by reaction of quinoline with methyl iodide. It has paralyzing effects.

== See also ==
- Quaternary ammonium compound
