= TPEC =

TPEC may refer to:

- Traditional Protestant Episcopal Church
- The Perumal Engineering College, Chennai, India
- Taipei Physical Education College, now the Tianmu Campus, University of Taipei
- Transitional Puntland Electoral Commission, which oversees elections in Somalia's Puntland state

== See also ==
- TPAC (disambiguation)
- List of countries by total primary energy consumption and production
