= Tetrabutylammonium tribromide =

Names
- IUPAC name N,N,N-Tributyl-1-butanaminium tribromide
- Other names TBATB, TBABr_{3}

Identifiers
CAS Number	38932-80-8
3D model (JSmol)	Interactive image
ChemSpider	2005880
ECHA InfoCard	100.132.625
PubChem CID	2723680
UNII	Q73L2AB4ZB
CompTox Dashboard (EPA)	DTXSID801028457
- InChI: InChI=1S/C16H36N.Br3/c1-5-9-13-17(14-10-6-2,15-11-7-3)16-12-8-4;1-3-2/h5-16H2,1-4H3;/q+1;-1 Key: XXSLZJZUSYNITM-UHFFFAOYSA-N; InChI=1S/C16H36N.Br3/c1-5-9-13-17(14-10-6-2,15-11-7-3)16-12-8-4;1-3-2/h5-16H2,1-4H3;/q+1;-1; InChI=1S/C16H36N.Br3/c1-5-9-13-17(14-10-6-2,15-11-7-3)16-12-8-4;1-3-2/h5-16H2,1-4H3;/q+1;-1 Key: XXSLZJZUSYNITM-UHFFFAOYSA-N
- SMILES: Br[Br-]Br.CCCC[N+](CCCC)(CCCC)CCCC

Properties
Chemical formula	C_{16}H_{36}Br_{3}N
Molar mass	482.183 g·mol^{−1}
Appearance	pale orange solid, red when recrystallized from DMF
Melting point	71 to 76 °C (160 to 169 °F; 344 to 349 K)
- Except where otherwise noted, data are given for materials in their standard state (at 25 °C [77 °F], 100 kPa). verify (what is ?) Infobox references

Tetrabutylammonium tribromide, abbreviated to TBATB, is a pale orange solid with the formula [N(C_{4}H_{9})_{4}]Br_{3}. It is a salt of the lipophilic tetrabutylammonium cation and the linear tribromide anion. The salt is sometimes used as a reagent used in organic synthesis as a conveniently weighable, solid source of bromine.

== Preparation ==
The compound is prepared by treatment of solid tetra-n-butylammonium bromide with bromine vapor:

[N(C_{4}H_{9})_{4}]Br + Br_{2} → [N(C_{4}H_{9})_{4}]Br_{3}

Instead of bromine, tetra-n-butylammonium bromide can also be reacted with vanadium pentoxide and aqueous hydrogen peroxide, or alternatively with ceric ammonium nitrate.

== See also ==
- Tribromide
- Tetrabutylammonium triiodide
