= Tetrapropylammonium chloride =

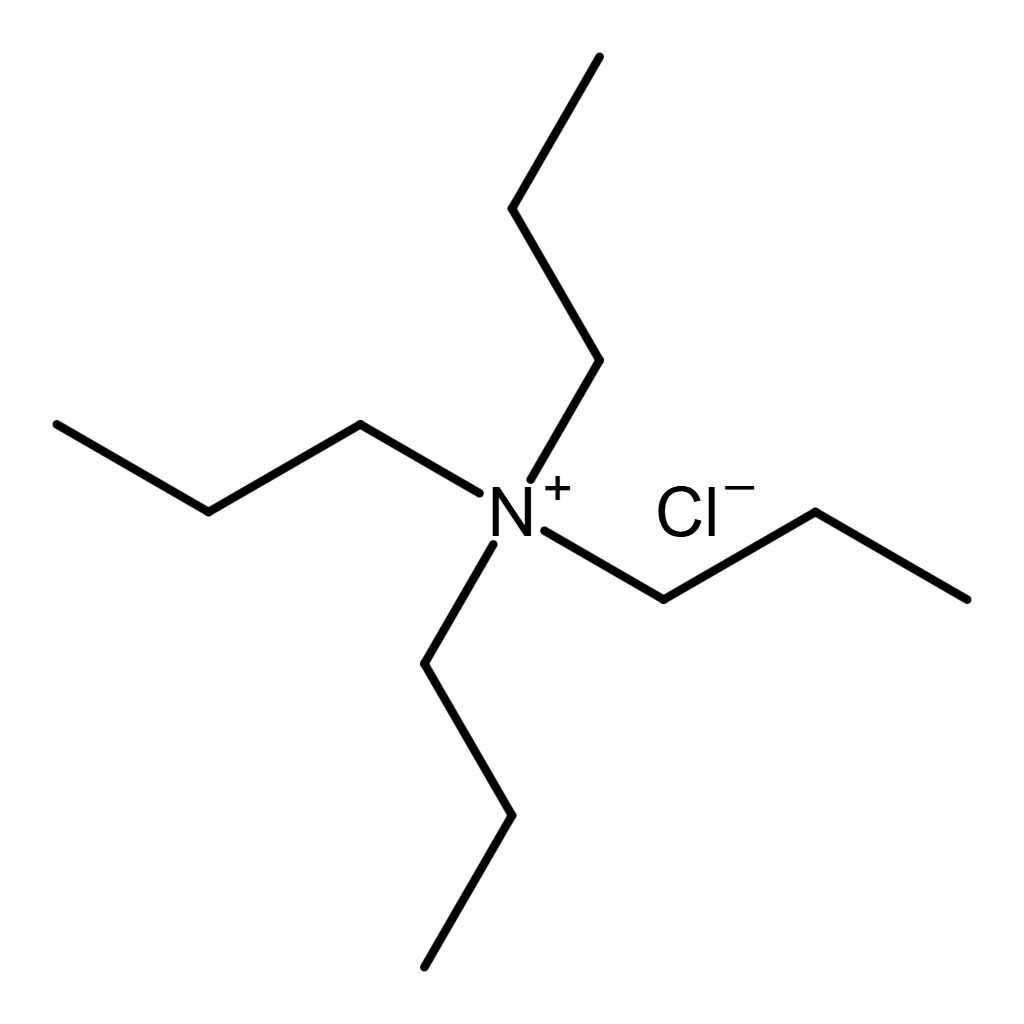

Names
- IUPAC name Tetrapropylazanium chloride
- Other names: 1-Propanaminium, N,N,N-tripropyl-, chloride; TPAC; TPACl; TPrACl

Identifiers
CAS Number	5810-42-4
3D model (JSmol)	Interactive image
ChemSpider	72171
ECHA InfoCard	100.024.887
EC Number	227-375-5
PubChem CID	79880
CompTox Dashboard (EPA)	DTXSID50884190
- InChI: InChI=1S/C12H28N.ClH/c1-5-9-13(10-6-2,11-7-3)12-8-4;/h5-12H2,1-4H3;1H/q+1;/p-1 Key: FBEVECUEMUUFKM-UHFFFAOYSA-M
- SMILES: CCC[N+](CCC)(CCC)CCC.[Cl-]

Properties
Chemical formula	[(CH_{3}CH_{2}CH_{2})_{4}N]Cl
Molar mass	221.81 g·mol^{−1}
Appearance	White crystalline solid
Odor	Odorless
Melting point	240–242 °C (464–468 °F; 513–515 K)
Solubility in water	Soluble
Solubility	Soluble in polar solvents like alcohols. Soluble in acetone.

Structure
Molecular shape	Tetrahedral at N

Hazards
- Occupational safety and health (OHS/OSH)
Main hazards	Serious eye irritation
- GHS labelling
Pictograms	(GHS07: Exclamation mark)
Signal word	Warning
Hazard statements	H315, H319, H335
Precautionary statements	P261, P264, P264+P265, P271, P280, P302+P352, P304+P340, P305+P351+P338, P319, P321, P332+P317, P337+P317, P362+P364, P403+P233, P405, P501
NFPA 704 (fire diamond)	2 1 1

Related compounds
Related compounds	Tetramethylammonium chloride; Tetraethylammonium chloride; Tetrabutylammonium chloride
- Except where otherwise noted, data are given for materials in their standard state (at 25 °C [77 °F], 100 kPa). Infobox references

Tetrapropylammonium chloride is an organic compound with the chemical formula [(CH_{3}CH_{2}CH_{2})_{4}N]Cl. It is a white, very hygroscopic crystalline solid. Tetrapropylammonium chloride is a quaternary ammonium salt. It consists of tetrapropylammonium cations [(CH_{3}CH_{2}CH_{2})_{4}N]^{+} and chloride anions Cl^{−}.

== Synthesis and properties ==
Tetrapropylammonium chloride is synthesized by reaction between tripropylamine and 1-chloropropane.

(CH_{3}CH_{2}CH_{2})_{3}N + CH_{3}CH_{2}CH_{2}Cl → [(CH_{3}CH_{2}CH_{2})_{4}N]Cl

The density of a concentrated aqueous solution of tetrapropylammonium chloride is less than that of a dilute solution at the same temperature.

The fully deuterated form of tetrapropylammonium chloride, [(CD_{3}CD_{2}CD_{2})_{4}N]Cl, is also a white solid.

== Uses ==
Tetrapropylammonium chloride is used as antimicrobial agent. It is also widely used as a phase-transfer catalyst in organic synthesis, facilitating the transfer of reactants between immiscible phases. It is used to stabilize emulsions and enhance solubility of hydrophobic compounds in aqueous solutions.
