= Benzyltrimethylammonium fluoride =

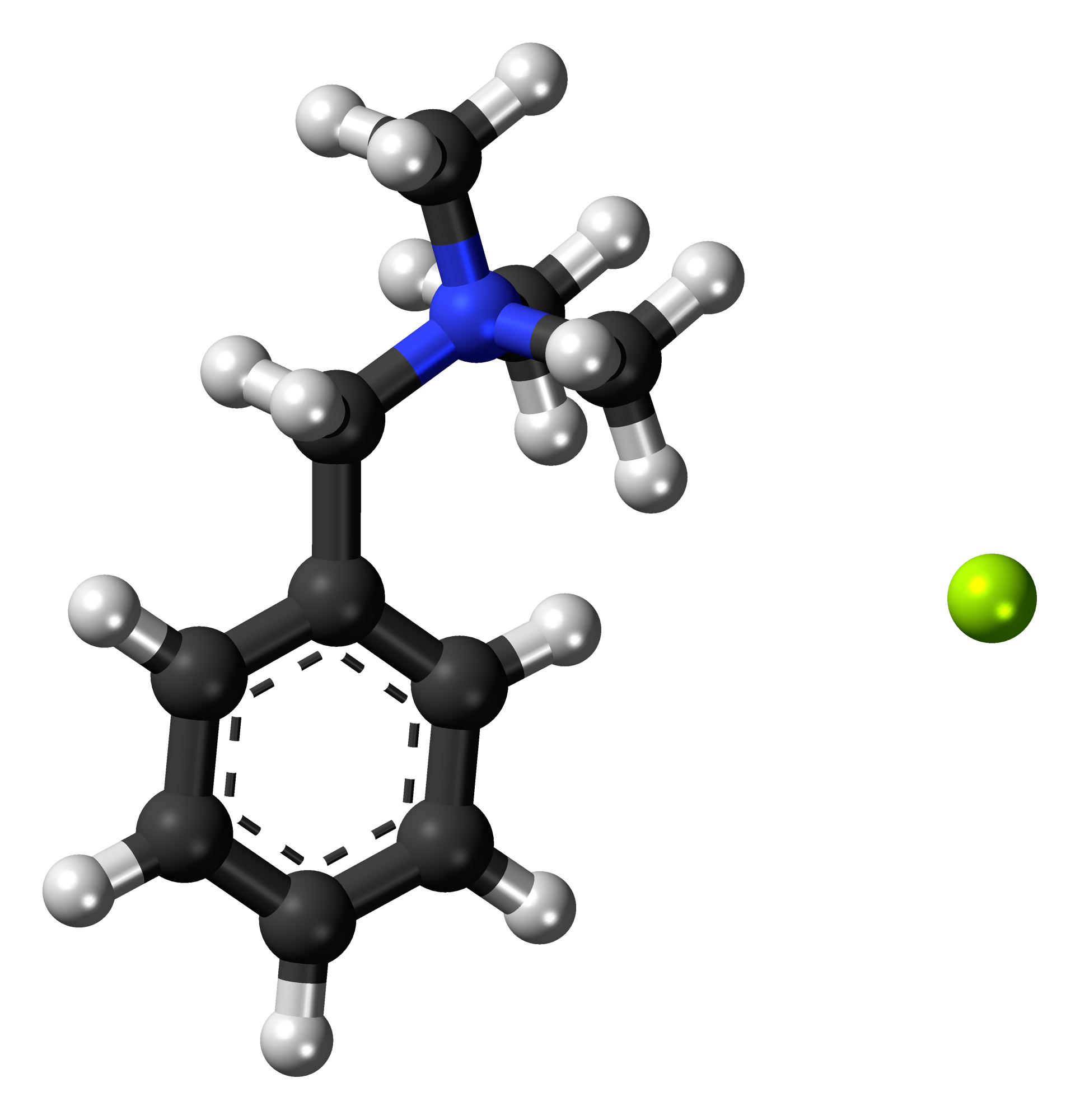

Names
- Preferred IUPAC name N,N,N-Trimethyl(phenyl)methanaminium fluoride
- Other names N,N,N-Trimethyl-1-phenylmethanaminium fluoride Benzyltrimethylammonium fluoride

Identifiers
CAS Number	329-97-5; 127582-36-9 (hydrate)
3D model (JSmol)	Interactive image
Abbreviations	BTAF
ChemSpider	9237969
ECHA InfoCard	100.149.876
EC Number	233-892-7
PubChem CID	16211989
UNII	J9C8NF6S7J
- InChI: InChI=1S/C10H16N.FH/c1-11(2,3)9-10-7-5-4-6-8-10;/h4-8H,9H2,1-3H3;1H/q+1;/p-1 Key: KFSZGBHNIHLIAA-UHFFFAOYSA-M; InChI=1/C10H16N.FH/c1-11(2,3)9-10-7-5-4-6-8-10;/h4-8H,9H2,1-3H3;1H/q+1;/p-1 Key: KFSZGBHNIHLIAA-REWHXWOFAM
- SMILES: C[N+](C)(C)CC1=CC=CC=C1.O.[F-]

Properties
Chemical formula	C_{10}H_{18}FNO
Molar mass	187.258 g·mol^{−1}
Appearance	Solid
Melting point	181 to 183 °C (358 to 361 °F; 454 to 456 K) for hydrate

Hazards
- GHS labelling
Pictograms	(GHS07: Exclamation mark)
Signal word	Warning
Hazard statements	H315, H319, H335
Precautionary statements	P261, P264, P271, P280, P302+P352, P304+P340, P305+P351+P338, P312, P321, P332+P313, P337+P313, P362, P403+P233, P405, P501
- Except where otherwise noted, data are given for materials in their standard state (at 25 °C [77 °F], 100 kPa). verify (what is ?) Infobox references

Benzyltrimethylammonium fluoride is a quaternary ammonium salt. It is commercially available as the hydrate. The compound is a source of organic-soluble fluoride to removal of silyl ether protecting groups. As is the case for tetra-n-butylammonium fluoride and most other quaternary ammonium fluorides, the compound cannot be obtained in anhydrous form.
