= C25H54ClN =

The molecular formula C_{25}H_{54}ClN (molar mass: 404.16 g/mol) may refer to:

- Aliquat 336
- Behentrimonium chloride, also known as docosyltrimethylammonium chloride or BTAC-228
