= Multiphasic =

Multiphasic may refer to:

- Multiphasic liquid
- Multiphasic contraceptive
