= Multiphasic liquid =

A multiphasic liquid is a mixture consisting of more than two immiscible liquid phases. Biphasic mixtures consisting of two immiscible phases are very common and usually consist of an organic solvent and an aqueous phase ("oil and water").

Multiphasic liquids can be used for selective liquid–liquid extractions or for decorative purposes, e.g. in cosmetics.

While it is possible to get multilayered phases by layering nonpolar and aqueous phases of decreasing densities on top of each other, these phases will not separate after mixing like true multiphasic liquids.

== Compositions ==
The following types of multiphasic liquids exist:

=== Triphasic systems ===
- Nonpolar solvent / aqueous biphasic mixture
  e.g. using hexane, heptane, cyclohexane, or mineral oil as the nonpolar solvent
  - Nonpolar solvent / polar solvent / salt / water
    e.g. 100 ml mineral oil, 100 ml isopropanol, 75 ml water, 35 g calcium chloride
  - Nonpolar solvent / water-soluble polymer A, water-soluble polymer B, water
    e.g. hexane, polyethylene oxide, dextran, water
  - Nonpolar solvent / water-soluble polymer / salt / water
    e.g. hexane, polyethylene oxide, sodium sulfate, water
  - Nonpolar solvent A / solvent B / polymer soluble in solvent B and water / water
    e.g. heptane, dichloromethane, polyethylene oxide, water
- Nonpolar solvent A / solvent B / polymer soluble in solvent B and water / salt / water
  e.g. 16.3% heptane, 21.7% dichloromethane, 9.5% polyethylene oxide, 51.5% water, 0.1% sodium sulfate
- Nonpolar solvent / hydrophobic salt / water
  e.g. iso-octane, Aliquat 336 (methyltrioctylammonium chloride, a phase transfer catalyst), water
  - or: cyclohexane, bmim-PF_{6} (an ionic liquid), water
- Hydrophobic ionic liquid – water – hydrocarbon systems
  - e.g. 1-butyl-3-methylimidazolium hexafluorophosphate – water – cyclohexane

=== Tetraphasic systems ===
- Nonpolar solvent A / solvent B / polymer soluble in solvent B and water / salt / water
  e.g. 10.9% heptane, 15.5% dichloromethane, 7.1% polyethylene oxide, 66.5% sodium sulfate (> 0.1%) in water
- Nonpolar solvent / Polar solvent / salt / water / Fluorinated solvent
  - e.g. Hexane, isopropanol, brine, perfluoromethylcyclohexane
- Non polar solvent / Aprotic polar solvent / Water / Fluorinated solvent
  - e.g. Octane, 5-methyl-1,3-dioxolane-4-one, water, perfluorodecaline

=== Higher-order multiphasic systems ===
A system with eight phases is known. In addition to a hydrocarbon and an aqueous phase, it includes a silicone oil, an aniline and a fluorous phase, and molten phosphorus, gallium and mercury.

== See also ==
- Separating funnel
