= TDA =

TDA may refer to:

== Finance ==
- Tax deferred annuity, a type of retirement plan under IRC Section 403(b)
- Time deposit account
- TreasuryDirect account, an account used to buy securities from the US Treasury
- "Treasury Direct Account," a fraud scheme promoted in the redemption movement

== Organizations ==
- Tautinio Darbo Apsaugos Batalionas, auxiliary police unit In Lithuania in 1941
- Team Disney Anaheim, the administrative headquarters of the Disneyland Resort in California
- Télédiffusion d'Algérie, an Algerian public service broadcasting and internet service provider
- Texas Department of Agriculture
- Thomas Deacon Academy, a city academy in Peterborough
- Toa Domestic Airlines, later known as Japan Air System
- Tournament Directors Association, an organization that works to standardize poker tournament rules worldwide
- Training and Development Agency for Schools, a defunct British teacher training program
- Tren de Aragua, a Venezuelan criminal organization
- United States Trade and Development Agency

== Television ==
- The Disney Afternoon, a two-hour television programming block
- Total Drama Action, the second season of Total Drama

== Chemistry ==
- Tris(2-(2-methoxyethoxy)ethyl)amine
- Toluenediamine

== Other ==
- TDA, ISO 639-3 code for the Gadal language
- Taking and driving away, a term for auto theft under Scottish law
- Tamm–Dancoff approximation, a method used in many-body theory
- Temporary duty assignment, a United States Government employee travel assignment
- Table of distribution and allowances, a temporary type of US Army TOE
- Topological data analysis
- Tornado detection algorithm, the replacement of the tornado vortex signature (TVS)
- Traditional double action, a style of semi-automatic pistol action, also known as DA/SA
