= Tetrabutylammonium triiodide =

Names
- IUPAC name Tetrabutylazanium triiodide
- Other names TBAI_{3}

Identifiers
| CAS Number | 13311-45-0 |
| 3D model (JSmol) | Interactive image |
| ChemSpider | 14389611 |
| KEGG | D83000 |
| PubChem CID | 16218639 |
- InChI: InChI=1S/C16H36N.I3/c1-5-9-13-17(14-10-6-2,15-11-7-3)16-12-8-4;1-3-2/h5-16H2,1-4H3;/q+1;-1 Key: SBSSZSCMFDYICE-UHFFFAOYSA-N
- SMILES: CCCC[N+](CCCC)(CCCC)CCCC.I[I-]I

Properties
| Chemical formula | C_{16}H_{36}I_{3}N |
| Molar mass | 623.184 g·mol^{−1} |
| Appearance | Black powder |
| Melting point | 69–71 °C (156–160 °F; 342–344 K) |

Hazards
- GHS labelling
| Pictograms | (GHS07: Exclamation mark) |
| Signal word | Warning |
| Hazard statements | H315, H319 |
| Precautionary statements | P264, P264+P265, P280, P302+P352, P305+P351+P338, P321, P332+P317, P337+P317, P362+P364 |
- Except where otherwise noted, data are given for materials in their standard state (at 25 °C [77 °F], 100 kPa). Infobox references

Tetra-n-butylammonium triiodide (TBAI_{3}) is a quaternary ammonium salt with a triiodide counterion. It is a common carrier of the triiodide used in chemical synthesis of photovoltaic materials, organic conductors and superconductors. In crystals, the triiodide moieties are linear and shows high crystallinity. The crystals have a black appearance with a needle or plate-like habit.

== See also ==
- Triiodide
- Tetrabutylammonium tribromide
- Organic superconductor
