= Salt metathesis reaction =

Type of a chemical reaction

A salt metathesis reaction (also called a double displacement reaction, double replacement reaction, or double decomposition) is a type of chemical reaction in which two compounds exchange their component ions to form two new compounds. Often, one of the products precipitates. Furthermore one of the reactants is typically a salt.

AB + CD -> AD + CB

$\overset{+1}{{\color{Orange}\ce{Ag}}}\overset{-1}{{\color{Blue}\ce{NO3}}} + \overset{+1}{{\color{Green}\ce{H}}}\overset{-1}{{\color{Magenta}\ce{Cl}}} \rightarrow \overset{+1}{{\color{Green}\ce{H}}}\overset{-1}{{\color{Blue}\ce{NO3}}} + \overset{+1}{{\color{Orange}\ce{Ag}}}\overset{-1}{{\color{Magenta}\ce{Cl(v)}}}$

In older literature, the term double decomposition is common. The term double decomposition is more specifically used when at least one of the substances does not dissolve in the solvent, as the ligand or ion exchange takes place in the solid state of the reactant. For example:

AX(aq) + BY(s) → AY(aq) + BX(s).

== Types of reactions ==
=== Counterion exchange ===
Salt metathesis is a common technique for exchanging counterions. The choice of reactants is guided by a solubility chart or lattice energy. HSAB theory can also be used to predict the products of a metathesis reaction.

Salt metathesis is often employed to obtain salts that are soluble in organic solvents. Illustrative is the conversion of sodium perrhenate to the tetrabutylammonium salt:

NaReO_{4} + N(C_{4}H_{9})_{4}Cl → N(C_{4}H_{9})_{4}[ReO_{4}] + NaCl

The tetrabutylammonium salt precipitates from the aqueous solution. It is soluble in dichloromethane.

Salt metathesis can be conducted in nonaqueous solution, illustrated by the conversion of ferrocenium tetrafluoroborate to a more lipophilic salt containing the tetrakis(pentafluorophenyl)borate anion:

[Fe(C_{5}H_{5})_{2}]BF_{4} + NaB(C_{6}F_{5})_{4} → [Fe(C_{5}H_{5})_{2}]B(C_{6}F_{5})_{4} + NaBF_{4}

When the reaction is conducted in dichloromethane, the salt NaBF_{4} precipitates and the B(C_{6}F_{5})_{4}- salt remains in solution.

Metathesis reactions can occur between two inorganic salts when one product is insoluble in the reaction solvent. For example, the precipitation of silver chloride from a mixture of silver nitrate and cobalt hexammine chloride delivers the nitrate salt of the cobalt complex:

3 AgNO_{3} + [Co(NH_{3})_{6}]Cl_{3} → 3 AgCl + [Co(NH_{3})_{6}](NO_{3})_{3}

The reactants need not be highly soluble for metathesis reactions to take place. For example barium thiocyanate forms when boiling a slurry of copper(I) thiocyanate and barium hydroxide in water:

Ba(OH)_{2} + 2CuCNS → Ba(CNS)_{2} + 2CuOH

==== Mechanisms ====
The mechanism of silver-based salt metathesis reactions are revealed with the use of AgCB_{11}H_{12}, which contains a weakly coordinating carborane anion. With IrCl(CO)(PPh_{3})_{2} (Vaska's Complex), the product is an adduct with a Ir-Ag bond. By contrast, AgClO_{4} simply delivers Ir(ClO_{4})(CO)(PPh_{3})_{2}. The intermediate Fe(Cp)(CO)_{2}I·Ag(B_{11}CH_{12}) is observed in the reaction of AgCB_{11}H_{12} with (C_{5}H_{5})Fe(CO)_{2}I.

=== Alkylation ===
Metal complexes are alkylated via salt metathesis reactions. Illustrative is the methylation of titanocene dichloride to give the Petasis reagent:

(C_{5}H_{5})_{2}TiCl_{2} + 2 ClMgCH_{3} → (C_{5}H_{5})_{2}Ti(CH_{3})_{2} + 2 MgCl_{2}

The salt product typically precipitates from the reaction solvent.

=== Neutralization reaction ===
A neutralization reaction is a type of double replacement reaction. A neutralization reaction occurs when an acid reacts with an equal amount of a base. This reaction usually produces a salt. One example, hydrochloric acid reacts with disodium iron tetracarbonyl to produce the iron dihydride:

2 HCl + Na_{2}Fe(CO)_{4} → 2 NaCl + H_{2}Fe(CO)_{4}

Reaction between an acid and a carbonate or bicarbonate salt yields carbonic acid, which spontaneously decomposes into carbon dioxide and water. The release of carbon dioxide gas from the reaction mixture drives the reaction to completion. For example, a common, science-fair "volcano" reaction involves the reaction of hydrochloric acid with sodium carbonate:

2 HCl + Na_{2}CO_{3} → H_{2}CO_{3} + 2 NaCl
H_{2}CO_{3} → H_{2}O + CO_{2}

=== Salt-free metathesis reaction ===
In contrast to salt metathesis reactions, which are driven by the precipitation of solid salts, are salt-free reductions, which are driven by formation of silyl halides, Salt-free metathesis reactions proceed homogeneously.

== Finkelstein reaction ==
In organic chemistry an analogue of the salt metathesis is well known, the Finkelstein reaction. It entails the conversion of an alkyl chloride or an alkyl bromide to an alkyl iodide by treatment with a solution of sodium iodide in acetone. Sodium chloride or sodium bromide precipitates. Illustrative is the conversion of the ethyl ester of 5-bromovaleric acid to the iodide:

EtO_{2}C(CH_{2})_{4}Br + NaI → EtO_{2}C(CH_{2})_{4}I + NaBr

== See also ==
- Single displacement reaction
