= Ionic transfer =

Transfer of ions from one liquid phase to another

Ionic transfer is the transfer of ions from one liquid phase to another. This is related to the phase transfer catalysts which are a special type of liquid-liquid extraction which is used in synthetic chemistry.

For instance nitrate anions can be transferred between water and nitrobenzene. One way to observe this is to use a cyclic voltammetry experiment where the liquid-liquid interface is the working electrode. This can be done by placing secondary electrodes in each phase and close to interface each phase has a reference electrode. One phase is attached to a potentiostat which is set to zero volts, while the other potentiostat is driven with a triangular wave. This experiment is known as a polarised Interface between Two Immiscible Electrolyte Solutions (ITIES) experiment.

== See also ==
- Diffusion potential
