= Tetrabutylammonium hydroxide =

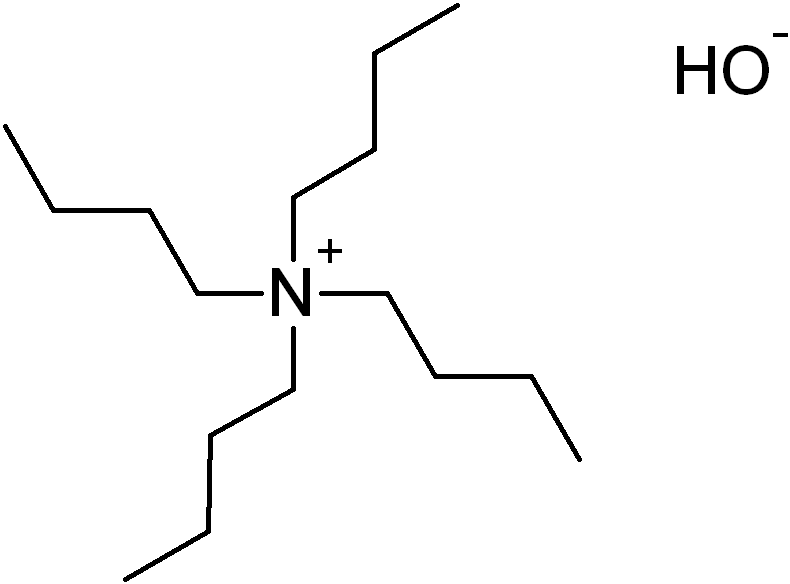

Names
- Preferred IUPAC name N,N,N-Tributylbutan-1-aminium hydroxide
- Other names TBAH, TBAOH

Identifiers
CAS Number	2052-49-5
3D model (JSmol)	Interactive image
ChEMBL	ChEMBL1078154
ChemSpider	2005872
ECHA InfoCard	100.016.498
PubChem CID	2723671
UNII	68I858J9S1
CompTox Dashboard (EPA)	DTXSID8062155
- InChI: InChI=1S/C16H36N.H2O/c1-5-9-13-17(14-10-6-2,15-11-7-3)16-12-8-4;/h5-16H2,1-4H3;1H2/q+1;/p-1 Key: VDZOOKBUILJEDG-UHFFFAOYSA-M; InChI=1/C16H36N.H2O/c1-5-9-13-17(14-10-6-2,15-11-7-3)16-12-8-4;/h5-16H2,1-4H3;1H2/q+1;/p-1 Key: VDZOOKBUILJEDG-REWHXWOFAE
- SMILES: [OH-].CCCC[N+](CCCC)(CCCC)CCCC

Properties
Chemical formula	C_{16}H_{37}NO
Molar mass	259.478 g·mol^{−1}
Solubility in water	soluble
Solubility	soluble in most organic solvents
- Except where otherwise noted, data are given for materials in their standard state (at 25 °C [77 °F], 100 kPa). verify (what is ?) Infobox references

Tetrabutylammonium hydroxide is a chemical compound with the formula (C_{4}H_{9})_{4}NOH, abbreviated Bu_{4}NOH with the acronym TBAOH or TBAH. This species is employed as a solution in water or alcohols. It is a common base in organic chemistry. Relative to more conventional inorganic bases, such as KOH and NaOH, Bu_{4}NOH is more soluble in organic solvents.

== Preparation and reactions ==
Solutions of Bu_{4}NOH are usually prepared in situ from butylammonium halides, Bu_{4}NX. For example, by reacting them with silver oxide or using an ion exchange resin. Attempts to isolate Bu_{4}NOH induces Hofmann elimination, leading to Bu_{3}N and 1-butene. Solutions of Bu_{4}NOH are typically contaminated with Bu_{3}N for this reason.

Treatment of Bu_{4}NOH with a wide range of acids forms water and other tetrabutylammonium salts:

Bu_{4}NOH + HX → Bu_{4}NX + H_{2}O

== Applications ==
Bu_{4}NOH is a strong base that is often used under phase-transfer conditions to effect alkylations and deprotonations. Typical reactions include benzylation of amines and generation of dichlorocarbene from chloroform.

Bu_{4}NOH can be neutralized with a variety of mineral acids to give lipophilic salts of the conjugate base. For example, treatment of Bu_{4}NOH with disodium pyrophosphate, Na_{2}H_{2}P_{2}O_{7}, gives (Bu_{4}N)_{3}[HP_{2}O_{7}], which is soluble in organic solvents. Similarly, neutralization of Bu_{4}NOH with hydrofluoric acid affords a relatively water-free Bu_{4}NF. This salt dissolves in organic solvents and is useful in desilylation.
