= TPAC =

TPAC may refer to:

- Tactical Pursuit And Containment, a United Kingdom police driving qualification
- Taipei Performing Arts Center, a performing arts center under construction in Taipei, Taiwan
- Tennessee Performing Arts Center, a performing arts facility in Nashville, Tennessee, US
- Tetrapropylammonium chloride, a chemical compound
- The Public Accounts Commission, a parliamentary auditing group in the UK
- Transpacific flight, a flight that crosses the Pacific Ocean
- Tulsa Performing Arts Center, a performing arts center in Oklahoma, US

== See also ==
- Tupac
