= Tetrabutylammonium hexafluorophosphate =

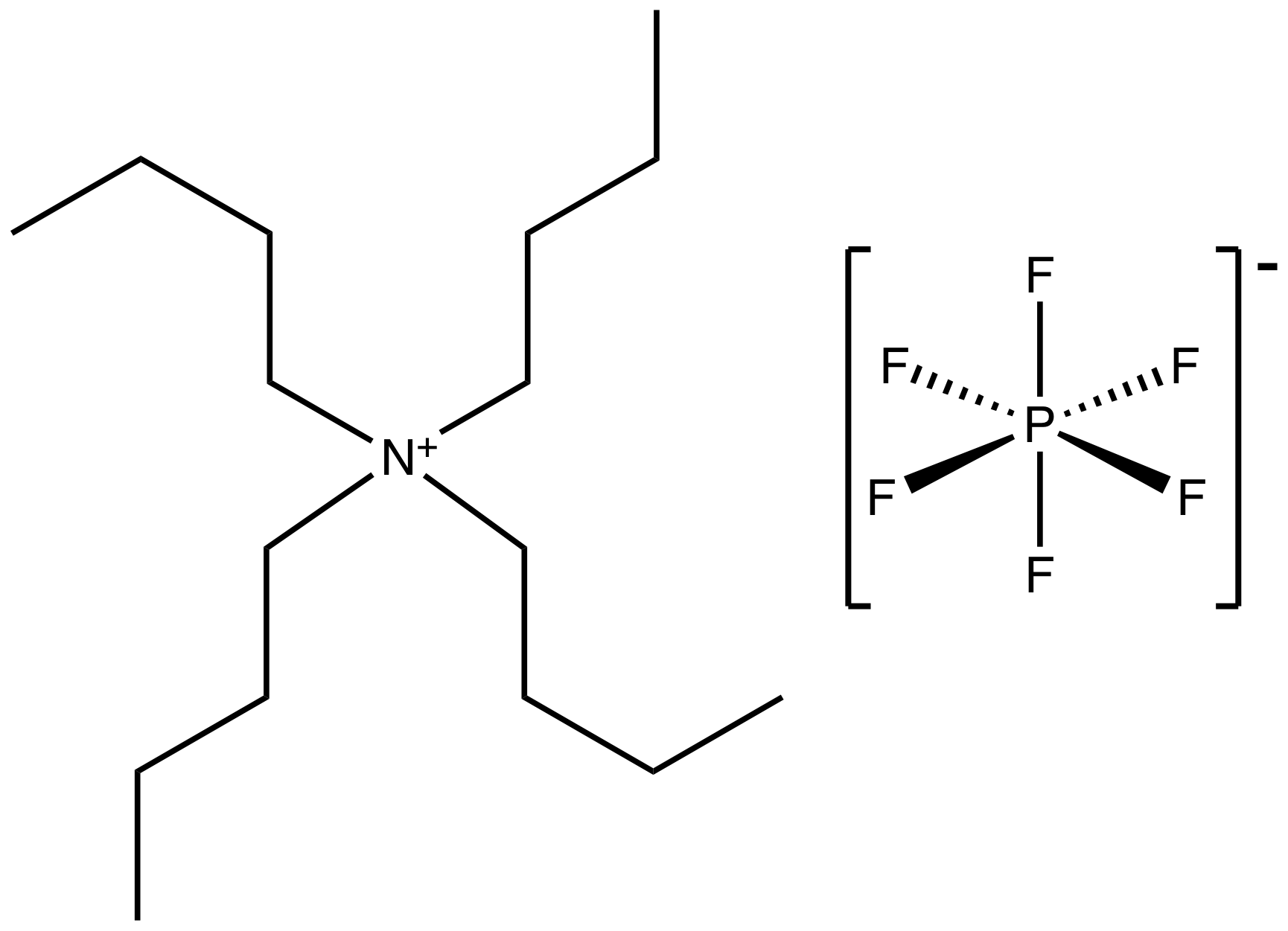

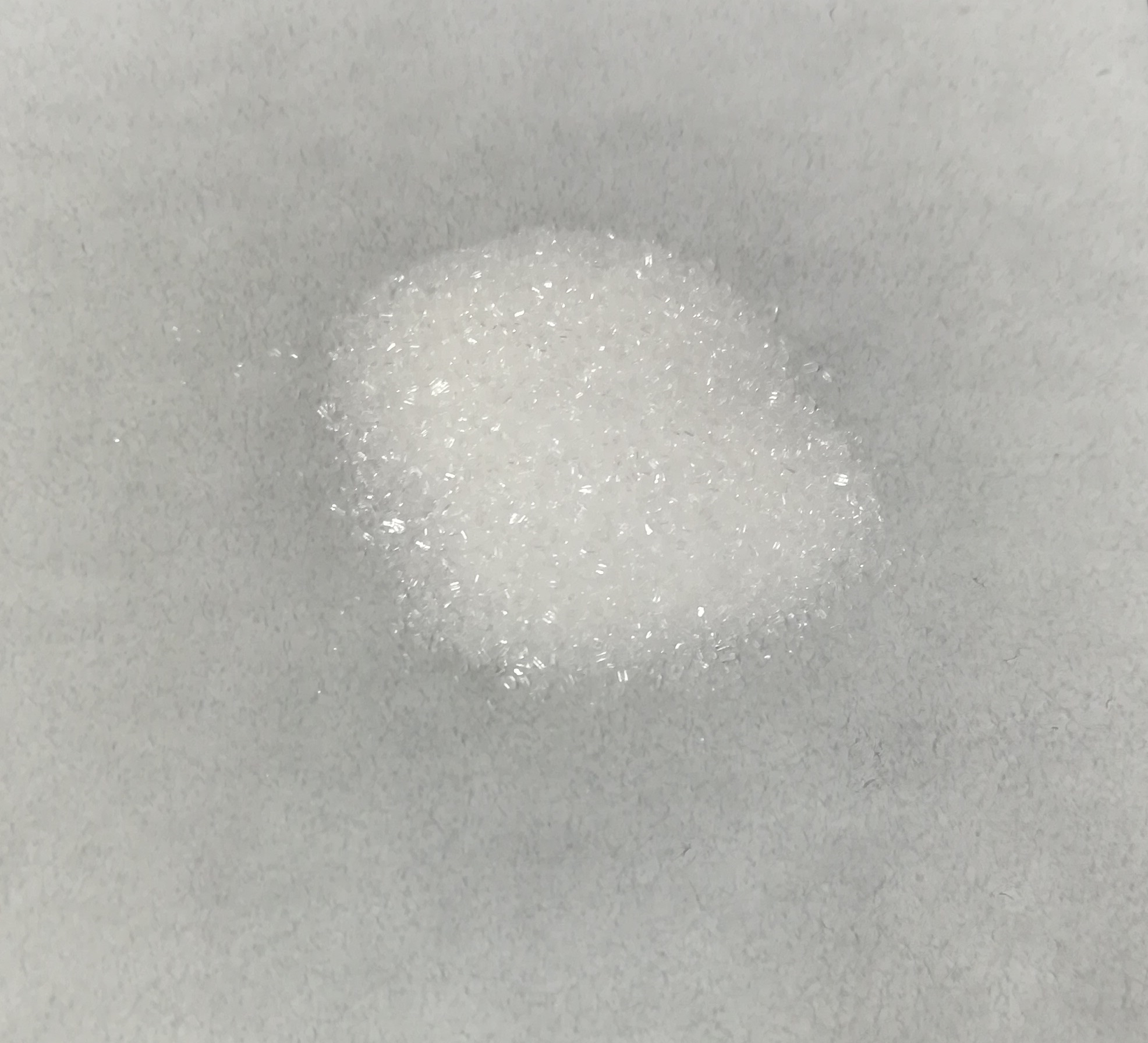

Names
- IUPAC name Tetrabutylammonium hexafluorophosphate
- Other names 1-Butanaminium, N,N,N-tributyl-, hexafluorophosphate(1-)

Identifiers
CAS Number	3109-63-5
3D model (JSmol)	Interactive image
ChemSpider	144722
ECHA InfoCard	100.019.520
PubChem CID	165075
CompTox Dashboard (EPA)	DTXSID0074344
- InChI: InChI=1S/C16H36N.F6P/c1-5-9-13-17(14-10-6-2,15-11-7-3)16-12-8-4;1-7(2,3,4,5)6/h5-16H2,1-4H3;/q+1;-1 Key: BKBKEFQIOUYLBC-UHFFFAOYSA-N; InChI=1/C16H36N.F6P/c1-5-9-13-17(14-10-6-2,15-11-7-3)16-12-8-4;1-7(2,3,4,5)6/h5-16H2,1-4H3;/q+1;-1 Key: BKBKEFQIOUYLBC-UHFFFAOYAC
- SMILES: CCCC[N+](CCCC)(CCCC)CCCC.F[P-](F)(F)(F)(F)F

Properties
Chemical formula	C_{16}H_{36}F_{6}NP
Molar mass	387.4279 g·mol^{−1}
Appearance	white powder
Melting point	244–246 °C (471–475 °F; 517–519 K)
- Except where otherwise noted, data are given for materials in their standard state (at 25 °C [77 °F], 100 kPa). Infobox references

Tetrabutylammonium hexafluorophosphate is a salt with the formula NBu_{4}PF_{6}. It is a white powder that is used as an electrolyte in nonaqueous electrochemistry. It is highly soluble in polar organic solvents such as acetone and acetonitrile.

The salt consists of a positively charged tetrabutylammonium, a quaternary ammonia cation and a weakly basic hexafluorophosphate anion. These species are chemically inert, which allows the salt to serve as an inert electrolyte over a wide potential range.

== Preparation ==
This salt can be prepared by the reaction of tetrabutylammonium bromide and potassium hexafluorophosphate in aqueous solution.

(C_{4}H_{9})_{4}NBr + KPF_{6} → (C_{4}H_{9})_{4}NPF_{6} + KBr

Given the sensitivity of electrochemical experiments, this salt is usually further purified, e.g., by recrystallization from aqueous or absolute ethanol.

== Use ==
This salt is used as a supporting electrolyte in electroanalysis as well as electrolytic growth methods (electrocrystallization). For instance, in the presence of this salt, the electrochemical oxidation of tetramethyltetraselenafulvalene (TMTSF) yields single crystals of (TMTSF)_{2}PF_{6}. This material is the first organic superconductor (T_{c} = 0.9 K at 12 kbar) reported by Klaus Bechgaard and Denis Jérome in 1980.
