= Tris(2-(2-methoxyethoxy)ethyl)amine =

Names
- Other names TDA-1, Tris(3,6-dioxaheptyl)amine

Identifiers
CAS Number	70384-51-9
3D model (JSmol)	Interactive image
ChemSpider	100755
ECHA InfoCard	100.067.787
EC Number	274-590-5
PubChem CID	112414
CompTox Dashboard (EPA)	DTXSID5072064
- InChI: InChI=1S/C15H33NO6/c1-17-10-13-20-7-4-16(5-8-21-14-11-18-2)6-9-22-15-12-19-3/h4-15H2,1-3H3 Key: XGLVDUUYFKXKPL-UHFFFAOYSA-N
- SMILES: COCCOCCN(CCOCCOC)CCOCCOC

Properties
Chemical formula	C_{15}H_{33}NO_{6}
Molar mass	323.430 g·mol^{−1}
Appearance	colorless oily liquid
Boiling point	171 °C (340 °F; 444 K)

Hazards
- GHS labelling
Pictograms	(GHS05: Corrosive)
Signal word	Warning
Hazard statements	H314
Precautionary statements	P260, P264, P264+P265, P280, P301+P330+P331, P302+P361+P354, P304+P340, P305+P354+P338, P316, P317, P321, P363, P405, P501
- Except where otherwise noted, data are given for materials in their standard state (at 25 °C [77 °F], 100 kPa). Infobox references

Tris(2-(2-methoxyethoxy)ethyl)amine is the organic compound with the formula N(CH_{2}CH_{2}OCH_{2}CH_{2}OCH_{3})_{3}. It is an amine and a polyether that can complex various metal ions. The compound is colorless, although samples can appear yellow.

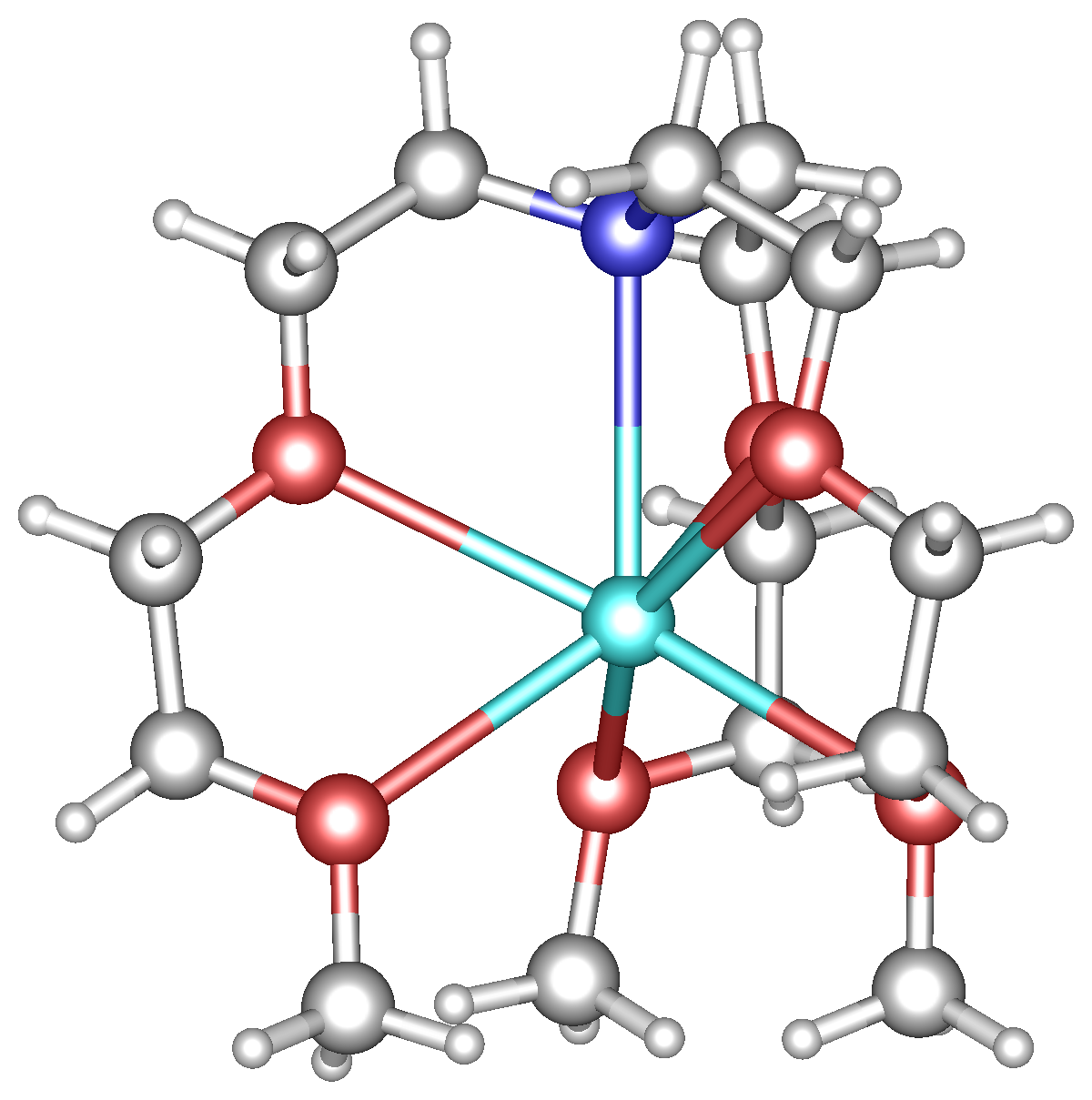
Structure of K^{+} bound to TDA-1. Color code: red = O, blue = N, turquoise = K.

Tris(2-(2-methoxyethoxy)ethyl)amine used in phase transfer catalysis (PTC). For PTC, it has been described as superior to 18-crown-6.
