= Aliquat 336 =

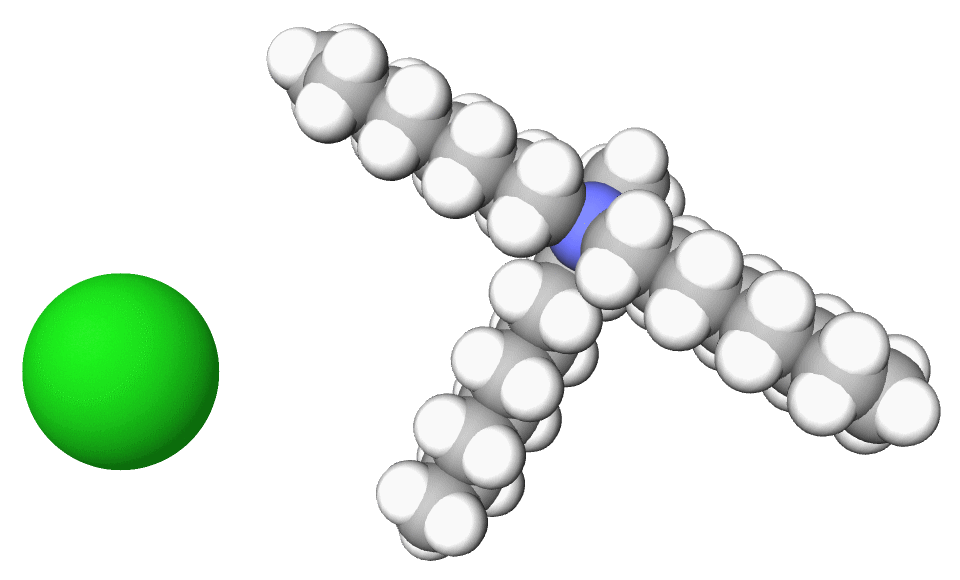

Names
- IUPAC name N-Methyl-N,N-dioctyloctan-1-aminium chloride
- Other names Starks' catalyst; Tricaprylmethylammonium chloride, Methyltrioctylammonium chloride

Identifiers
CAS Number	63393-96-4
3D model (JSmol)	Interactive image; Interactive image
ChemSpider	19948
ECHA InfoCard	100.058.273
PubChem CID	21218
RTECS number	UZ2997500
UNII	YNE6ALT384
- InChI: InChI=1S/C25H54N.ClH/c1-5-8-11-14-17-20-23-26(4,24-21-18-15-12-9-6-2)25-22-19-16-13-10-7-3;/h5-25H2,1-4H3;1H/q+1;/p-1 Key: XKBGEWXEAPTVCK-UHFFFAOYSA-M; InChI=1/C25H54N.ClH/c1-5-8-11-14-17-20-23-26(4,24-21-18-15-12-9-6-2)25-22-19-16-13-10-7-3;/h5-25H2,1-4H3;1H/q+1;/p-1 Key: XKBGEWXEAPTVCK-REWHXWOFAD
- SMILES: CCCCCCCC[N+](CCCCCCCC)(C)CCCCCCCC.[Cl-]; [Cl-].C(CCCCCC[N+](CCCCCCCC)(CCCCCCCC)C)C

Properties
Chemical formula	C_{25}H_{54}ClN
Molar mass	404.16 g·mol^{−1}
Appearance	Colorless viscous liquid
Density	0.884 g/cm^{3}
Melting point	−20 °C (−4 °F; 253 K)
Boiling point	225 °C (437 °F; 498 K)
Viscosity	1500 mPa·s at 30 °C

Hazards
- Occupational safety and health (OHS/OSH)
Main hazards	Toxic (USA)
- GHS labelling
Pictograms	(GHS05: Corrosive) (GHS06: Toxic) (GHS07: Exclamation mark) (GHS09: Environmental hazard)
Signal word	Danger
Hazard statements	H301, H315, H318, H319, H410
Precautionary statements	P264, P270, P273, P280, P301+P310, P302+P352, P305+P351+P338, P310, P321, P330, P332+P313, P337+P313, P362, P391, P405, P501
Flash point	113 °C (235 °F; 386 K) (closed cup)
Safety data sheet (SDS)	External MSDS

Related compounds
Related	Aliquat 100, Aliquat 134, Aliquat 175, Aliquat HTA-1
- Except where otherwise noted, data are given for materials in their standard state (at 25 °C [77 °F], 100 kPa). verify (what is ?) Infobox references

Aliquat 336 (Starks' catalyst) is a quaternary ammonium salt used as a phase transfer catalyst and metal extraction reagent. It contains a mixture of C_{8} (octyl) and C_{10} (decyl) chains with C_{8} predominating. It is an ionic liquid.

== Applications ==
=== Organic Chemistry ===
Aliquat 336 is used as a phase transfer catalyst, including in the catalytic oxidation of cyclohexene to 1,6-hexanedioic acid. This reaction is an example of green chemistry, as it is more environmentally friendly than the traditional method of oxidizing cyclohexanol or cyclohexanone with nitric acid or potassium permanganate, which produce hazardous wastes.

Aliquat 336 was used in the total synthesis of manzamine A by Darren Dixon.

=== Solvent extraction of metals ===
Aliquat 336 has been used for the extraction of metals by acting as a liquid anion exchanger. It is commonly used as a solution in hydrocarbon solvents such as aromatic kerosene. Aliphatic kerosene can also be used, but requires the addition of a phase modifier (typically a long chain alcohol) to prevent the formation of third phase.

=== Waste treatment ===
Several applications have been successfully carried out with Aliquat 336, such as the recovery of acids or acid salts, or the removal of certain metals from wastewater. In addition, foaming has also been controlled by using this agent during the treatment of wastewater containing anionic surfactants.
