= Homarine =

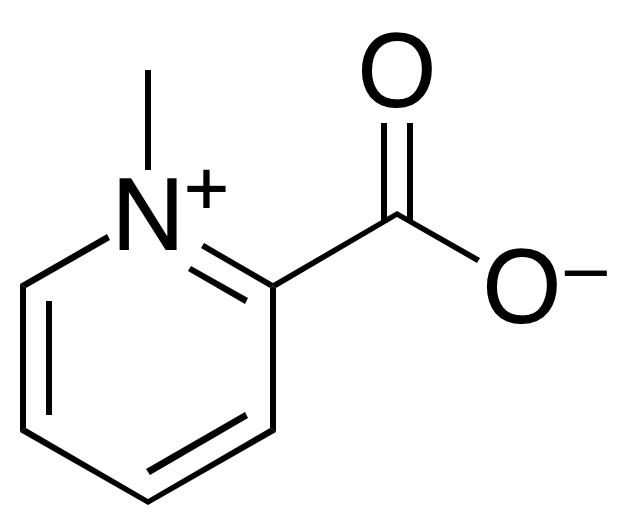

Names
- Preferred IUPAC name 1-Methylpyridin-1-ium-2-carboxylate
- Other names N-methyl picolinic acid betaine, Betaine homarine

Identifiers
CAS Number	445-30-7
3D model (JSmol)	Interactive image
ChEBI	CHEBI:69061
ChemSpider	3494
PubChem CID	3620
UNII	KQ3VHX1490
CompTox Dashboard (EPA)	DTXSID10196201
- InChI: InChI=1S/C7H7NO2/c1-8-5-3-2-4-6(8)7(9)10/h2-5H,1H3 Key: BRTLKRNVNFIOPJ-UHFFFAOYSA-N
- SMILES: C[N+]1=CC=CC=C1C(=O)[O-]

Properties
Chemical formula	C_{7}H_{7}NO_{2}
Molar mass	137.138 g·mol^{−1}
- Except where otherwise noted, data are given for materials in their standard state (at 25 °C [77 °F], 100 kPa). Infobox references

Homarine (N-methyl picolinic acid betaine) is an organic compound with the chemical formula C_{7}H_{7}NO_{2}. It is commonly found in aquatic organisms from phytoplankton to crustaceans, although it is not found in vertebrates.

== Biological function ==
Homarine functions as an osmolyte by affecting the ionic strength of the cytosol and thereby maintaining osmotic pressure within the cell.

Homarine may also act as a methyl group donor in the biosynthesis of various other N-methylated chemicals, such as glycine betaine and choline. The process of methyl donation converts homarine into picolinic acid and is reversible.

== Etymology ==
The name of this chemical comes from the initial discovery of the molecule in 1933 in lobster tissue: the word homarine as an adjective means "of, or relating to, lobsters" (i.e. genus Homarus).
