= Tributylamine =

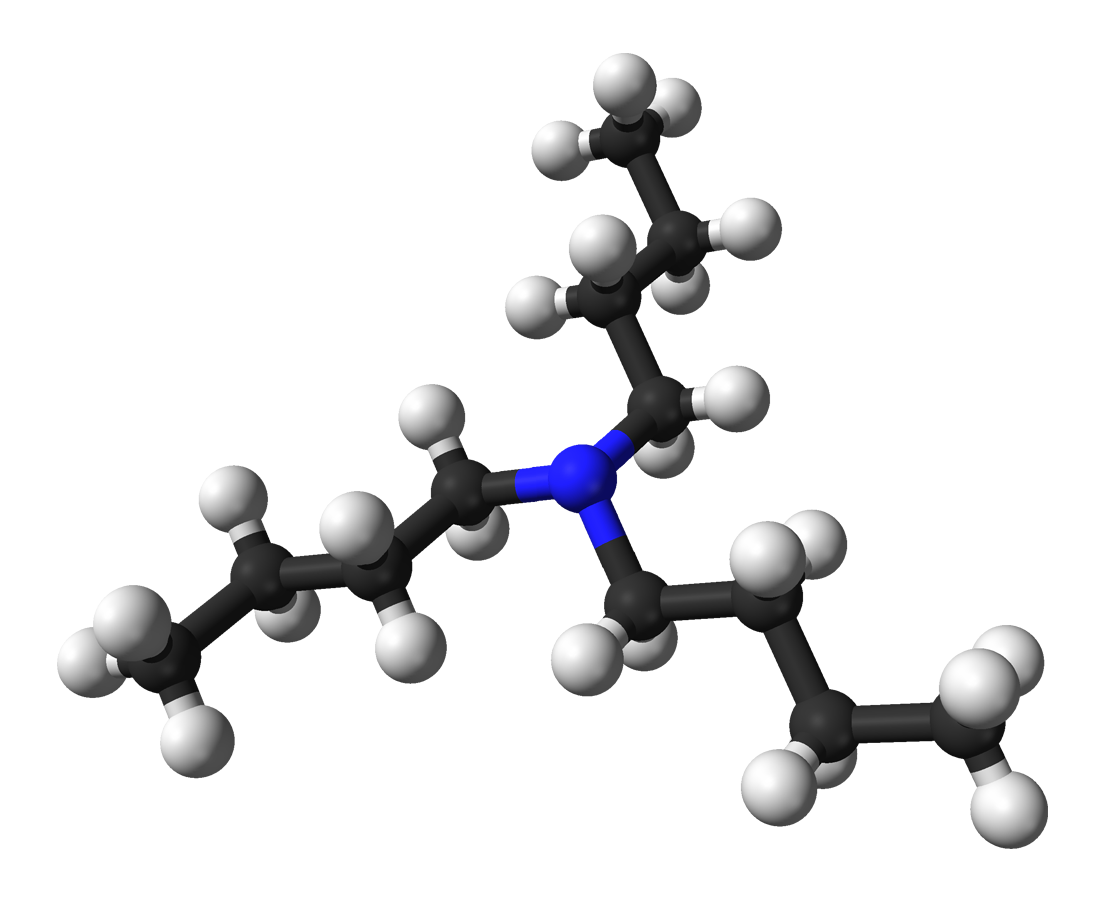

Names
- Preferred IUPAC name N,N-Dibutylbutan-1-amine
- Other names (Tributyl)amine (The name tributylamine is deprecated.)

Identifiers
CAS Number	102-82-9
3D model (JSmol)	Interactive image
ChemSpider	7340
ECHA InfoCard	100.002.781
PubChem CID	7622
UNII	C3TZB2W0R7
CompTox Dashboard (EPA)	DTXSID4026183
- InChI: InChI=1S/C12H27N/c1-4-7-10-13(11-8-5-2)12-9-6-3/h4-12H2,1-3H3 Key: IMFACGCPASFAPR-UHFFFAOYSA-N; InChI=1/C12H27N/c1-4-7-10-13(11-8-5-2)12-9-6-3/h4-12H2,1-3H3 Key: IMFACGCPASFAPR-UHFFFAOYAY
- SMILES: N(CCCC)(CCCC)CCCC

Properties
Chemical formula	C_{12}H_{27}N
Molar mass	185.355 g·mol^{−1}
Appearance	Colorless liquid
Density	0.78 g/cm^{3}
Melting point	−70 °C (−94 °F; 203 K)
Boiling point	214 °C (417 °F; 487 K)
Solubility in water	50 mg/L (20 °C)

Hazards
Flash point	86 °C (187 °F; 359 K)

Related compounds
Related	Tributylphosphine
- Except where otherwise noted, data are given for materials in their standard state (at 25 °C [77 °F], 100 kPa). Infobox references

Tributylamine (TBA) is an organic compound with the molecular formula (C_{4}H_{9})_{3}N. It is a colorless liquid with an amine-like odor.

== Uses ==
Tributylamine is used as a catalyst (proton acceptor) and as a solvent in organic syntheses and polymerization (including polyurethanes).
