= Lithium tetrakis(pentafluorophenyl)borate =

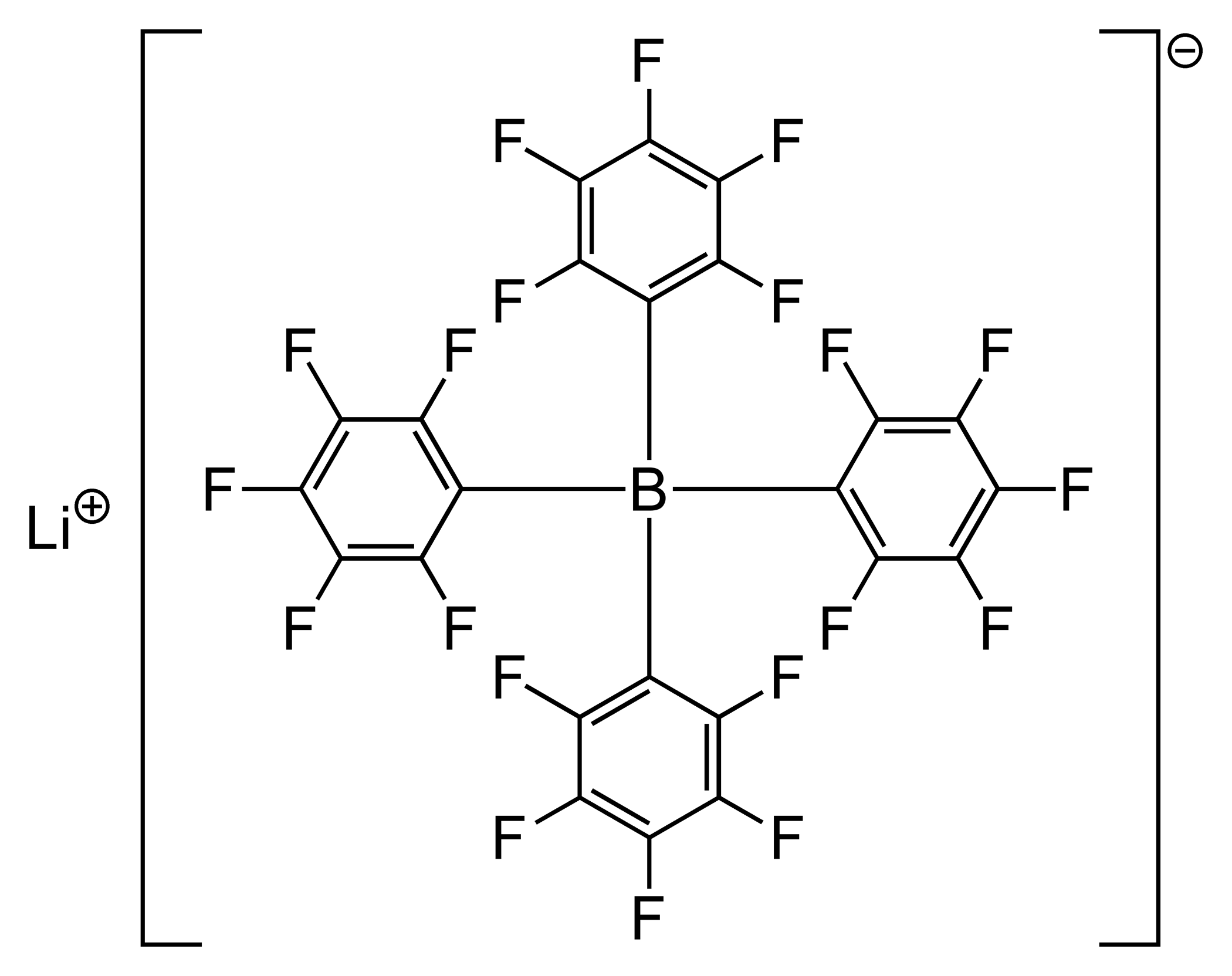

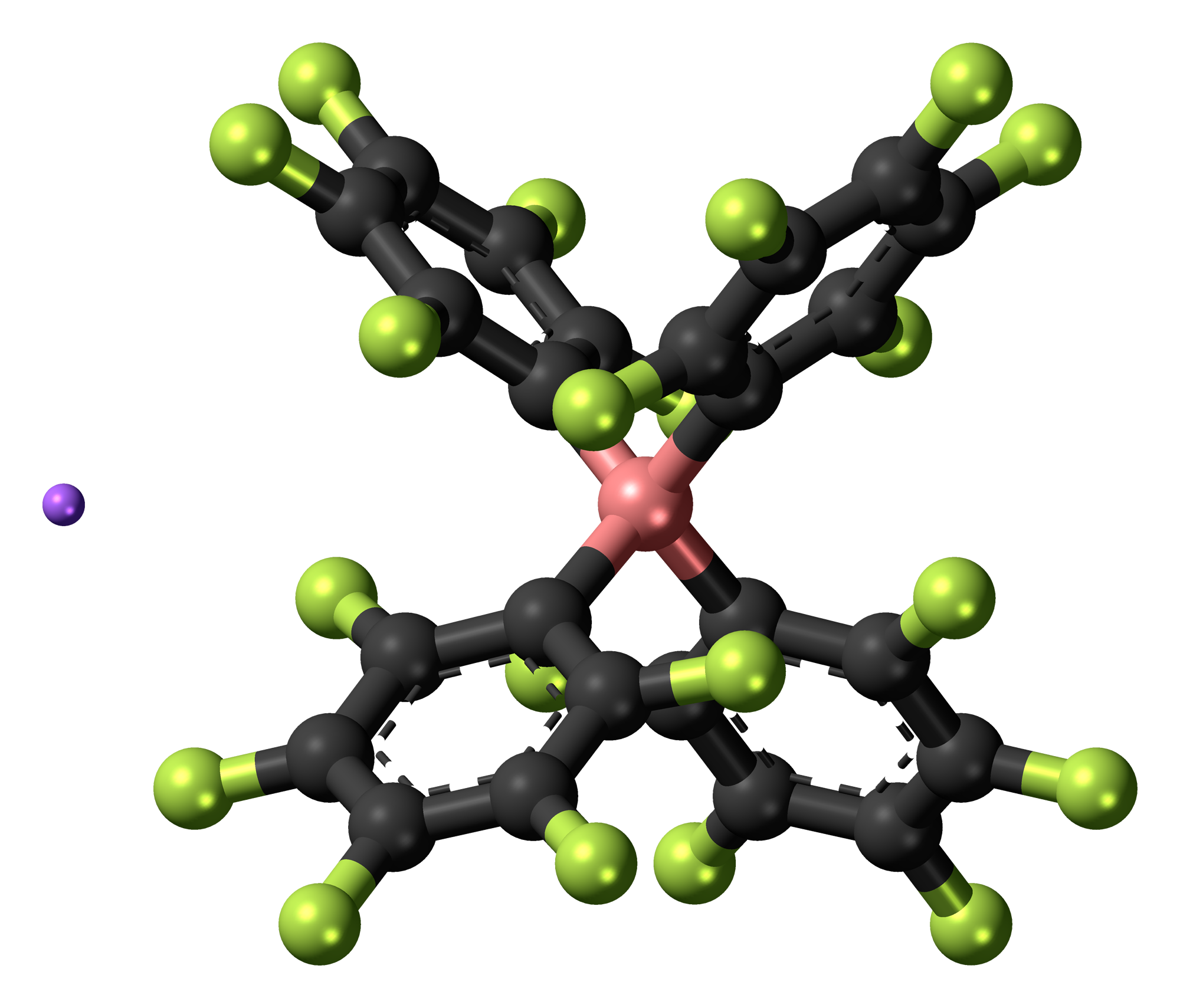

Names
- Preferred IUPAC name Lithium tetrakis(pentafluorophenyl)boranuide

Identifiers
CAS Number	371162-53-7 (etherate)
3D model (JSmol)	Interactive image
ChemSpider	8071952; 9160766 (etherate)
ECHA InfoCard	100.155.284
PubChem CID	9896287
- InChI: InChI=1S/C24BF20.Li/c26-5-1(6(27)14(35)21(42)13(5)34)25(2-7(28)15(36)22(43)16(37)8(2)29,3-9(30)17(38)23(44)18(39)10(3)31)4-11(32)19(40)24(45)20(41)12(4)33;/q-1;+1 Key: WTTFKRRTEAPVBI-UHFFFAOYSA-N; InChI=1/C24BF20.Li/c26-5-1(6(27)14(35)21(42)13(5)34)25(2-7(28)15(36)22(43)16(37)8(2)29,3-9(30)17(38)23(44)18(39)10(3)31)4-11(32)19(40)24(45)20(41)12(4)33;/q-1;+1 Key: WTTFKRRTEAPVBI-UHFFFAOYAW
- SMILES: [Li+].Fc1c(c(F)c(F)c(F)c1F)[B-](c2c(F)c(F)c(F)c(F)c2F)(c3c(F)c(F)c(F)c(F)c3F)c4c(F)c(F)c(F)c(F)c4F

Properties
Chemical formula	C_{24}BF_{20}Li
Molar mass	685.98 g·mol^{−1}
- Except where otherwise noted, data are given for materials in their standard state (at 25 °C [77 °F], 100 kPa). verify (what is ?) Infobox references

Lithium tetrakis(pentafluorophenyl)borate is the lithium salt of tetrakis(pentafluorophenyl)borate ((B(C_{6}F_{5})_{4})^{−}), a weakly coordinating anion. Because of its weakly coordinating abilities, lithium tetrakis(pentafluorophenyl)borate makes it commercially valuable in the salt form in the catalyst composition for olefin polymerization reactions and in electrochemistry. It is a water-soluble compound. Its anion is closely related to the non-coordinating anion known as BARF. The tetrakis(pentafluorophenyl)borates have the advantage of operating on a one-to-one stoichiometric basis with Group IV transition metal polyolefin catalysts, unlike methylaluminoxane (MAO) which may be used in large excess.

== Structure and properties ==
The anion is tetrahedral with B-C bond lengths of approximately 1.65 Angstroms. The salt has only been obtained as the etherate, and the crystallography confirms that four ether (OEt_{2}) molecules are bound to the lithium cation, with Li-O bond lengths of approximately 1.95 Å. The [Li(OEt_{2})_{4}]^{+} complex is tetrahedral.

== Preparation ==
The salt was first produced in studies on tris(pentafluorophenyl)boron, a well known Lewis acidic compound. Combining equimolar ether solutions of pentafluorophenyllithium and tris(pentafluorophenyl)boron gives the lithium salt of tetrakis(pentafluorophenyl)borate, which precipitates the etherate as a white solid:

B(C_{6}F_{5})_{3} + Li(C_{6}F_{5}) + 4 OEt_{2} → [Li(OEt_{2})_{4}][B(C_{6}F_{5})_{4}]

Since its discovery, many revised syntheses have been described.

== Reactions ==
Lithium tetrakis(pentafluorophenyl)borate is primarily used to prepare cationic transition metal complexes:

LiB(C_{6}F_{5})_{4}) + ML_{n}Cl → LiCl + [ML_{n}]B(C_{6}F_{5})_{4}

LiB(C_{6}F_{5})_{4} is converted to the trityl reagent [Ph_{3}C][B(C_{6}F_{5})_{4}], which is useful activator of Lewis-acid catalysts.

== Safety ==
Lithium tetrakis(pentafluorophenyl)borate will deflagrate on melting (ca. 265 °C) giving thick black smoke, even under nitrogen. The mechanism is unknown. Metal tetrakis(pentafluorophenyl)borates of K and Na decompose vigorously as well.

== See also ==
- Tetraphenylborate
