= Tetra-n-butylammonium fluoride =

Names
- Preferred IUPAC name N,N,N-Tributylbutan-1-aminium fluoride
- Other names Tetrabutylammonium fluoride; TBAF; n-Bu_{4}NF

Identifiers
CAS Number	429-41-4; 87749-50-6 (trihydrate)
3D model (JSmol)	Interactive image
ChEMBL	ChEMBL1078233
ChemSpider	2006300
ECHA InfoCard	100.006.417
PubChem CID	2724141
UNII	2618F0C37I
CompTox Dashboard (EPA)	DTXSID10883381
- InChI: InChI=1S/C16H36N.FH/c1-5-9-13-17(14-10-6-2,15-11-7-3)16-12-8-4;/h5-16H2,1-4H3;1H/q+1;/p-1 Key: FPGGTKZVZWFYPV-UHFFFAOYSA-M; InChI=1/C16H36N.FH/c1-5-9-13-17(14-10-6-2,15-11-7-3)16-12-8-4;/h5-16H2,1-4H3;1H/q+1;/p-1 Key: FPGGTKZVZWFYPV-REWHXWOFAO
- SMILES: [F-].CCCC[N+](CCCC)(CCCC)CCCC

Properties
Chemical formula	(C_{4}H_{9})_{4}NF
Molar mass	261.46 g/mol
Melting point	58 to 60 °C (136 to 140 °F; 331 to 333 K) (trihydrate)
- Except where otherwise noted, data are given for materials in their standard state (at 25 °C [77 °F], 100 kPa). verify (what is ?) Infobox references

Tetra-n-butylammonium fluoride, commonly abbreviated to TBAF and n-Bu_{4}NF, is a quaternary ammonium salt with the chemical formula (CH_{3}CH_{2}CH_{2}CH_{2})_{4}N^{+}F^{−}. It is commercially available as the white solid trihydrate and as a solution in tetrahydrofuran. TBAF is used as a source of fluoride ion in organic solvents.

== Preparation and properties ==
TBAF can be prepared by passing hydrofluoric acid through an ion-exchange resin, followed by tetrabutylammonium bromide. Upon evaporation of the water, TBAF can be collected as an oil in quantitative yield.

Preparing anhydrous samples is of interest as the basicity of fluoride increases by more than 20 pK units on passing from aqueous to aprotic solvent. However, heating samples of the hydrated material to 77 °C under vacuum causes decomposition to the hydrogen difluoride salt. Similarly, samples dried at 40 °C under high vacuum still contain 10-30 mol% of water and some 10% of difluoride. Instead, anhydrous TBAF has been prepared by the reaction of hexafluorobenzene and tetrabutylammonium cyanide. Solutions of the salt in acetonitrile and dimethyl sulfoxide are stable.

== Reactions and uses ==
Because the fluoride ion is such a strong hydrogen bond acceptor, its salts tend to be hydrated and of limited solubility in organic solvents. As a fluoride ion source, TBAF solves this problem, although the nature of the fluoride is uncertain because TBAF samples are almost always hydrated, resulting in the formation of bifluoride (HF_{2}^{−}) hydroxide (OH^{−}) as well as fluoride. Many applications tolerate heterogeneous or ill-defined fluoride sources.

As a fluoride source in organic solvents, TBAF is used to remove silyl ether protecting groups. It is also used as a phase transfer catalyst and as a mild base. As a deprotecting agent, TBAF in DMSO will convert O-silylated enolates into carbonyls. With C-Si bonds, TBAF gives carbanions that can be trapped with electrophiles or undergo protonolysis.

TBAF is also used, when in an organic solvent, as an activator compound to allow super glue to stick to low surface energy polymers such as polyethylene and polypropylene.
