= Phase-transfer catalyst =

Substance which facilitates the phase transition of a reactant

In chemistry, a phase-transfer catalyst or PTC is a catalyst that facilitates the transition of a reactant from one phase into another phase where reaction occurs. Phase-transfer catalysis is a special form of catalysis and can act through homogeneous catalysis or heterogeneous catalysis methods depending on the catalyst used. Ionic reactants are often soluble in an aqueous phase but insoluble in an organic phase in the absence of the phase-transfer catalyst. The catalyst functions like a detergent for solubilizing the salts into the organic phase. Phase-transfer catalysis refers to the acceleration of the reaction upon the addition of the phase-transfer catalyst. PTC is widely exploited industrially. Polyesters for example are prepared from acyl chlorides and bisphenol-A. Phosphothioate-based pesticides are generated by PTC-catalyzed alkylation of phosphothioates.

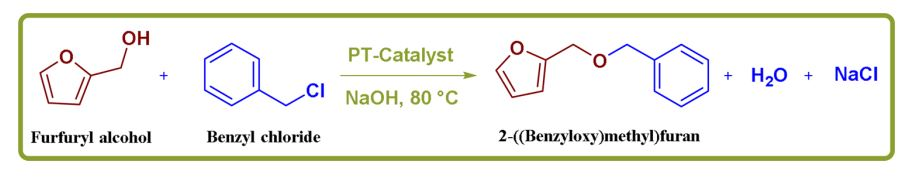
Liquid-liquid-liquid triphase transfer catalysis, Molecular Catalysis 466 (2019) 112–121

In ideal cases, PTC can be fast and efficient, minimizing the need for expensive or dangerous solvents and simplifying purification Phase-transfer catalysts are "green"—by allowing the use of water, the need for organic solvents is lowered.

== Types ==
Tris(2-(2-methoxyethoxy)ethyl)amine is a tertiary amine type phase transfer catalyst

Phase-transfer catalysts for anionic reactants are often quaternary ammonium salts. Commercially important catalysts include benzyltriethylammonium chloride, methyltricaprylammonium chloride and methyltributylammonium chloride. Organic phosphonium salts are also used, e.g., hexadecyltributylphosphonium bromide. The phosphonium salts tolerate higher temperatures.

An alternative to the use of "quat salts" is to convert alkali metal cations into hydrophobic cations. Crown ethers are used for this purpose on the laboratory scale. Polyethylene glycols and their amine derivatives are common in practical applications. One such catalyst is tris(2-(2-methoxyethoxy)ethyl)amine. These ligands encapsulate alkali metal cations (typically Na^{+} and K^{+}), affording lipophilic cations. Polyethers have a hydrophilic "interiors" containing the ion and a hydrophobic exterior.

Chiral phase-transfer catalysts have also been demonstrated. Asymmetric alkylations are catalyzed by chiral quaternary ammonium salts derived from cinchona alkaloids.

A variety of functionalized catalysts have been evaluated for PTC. One example is the Janus interphase catalyst, applicable to organic reactions on the interface of two phases via the formation of Pickering emulsion.

=== Limitations ===
Quaternary ammonium cations degrade by Hofmann degradation to various amines, especially at the temperatures preferred by process chemists. The resulting amines can be difficult to remove from the product. Phosphonium compounds are unstable toward bases, degrading to phosphine oxide.

=== Laboratory examples ===
For example, the nucleophilic substitution reaction of an aqueous sodium cyanide solution with an ethereal solution of 1-bromooctane does not readily occur. The 1-bromooctane is poorly soluble in the aqueous cyanide solution, and the sodium cyanide does not dissolve well in the ether. Upon the addition of small amounts of hexadecyltributylphosphonium bromide, a rapid reaction ensues to give nonyl nitrile:

$$\ce{C8H17Br_{(org)}{} + NaCN_{(aq)} ->[\ce{R4P+Br-}] C8H17CN_{(org)}{} + NaBr_{(aq)}}$$

By the quaternary phosphonium cation, cyanide ions are "ferried" from the aqueous phase into the organic phase.

Subsequent work demonstrated that many such reactions can be performed rapidly at around room temperature using catalysts such as tetra-n-butylammonium bromide and methyltrioctylammonium chloride in benzene/water systems.

== Phase-boundary catalysis ==
Phase-boundary catalysis (PBC) is a type of PTC wherein catalysis occurs at a phase boundary. Some zeolites can be modified to operate by PBC: they are hydrophobic on the inside and hydrophilic on the outside. In some sense, PBC resemble enzymes. The major difference between this system and enzyme is lattice flexibility. The lattice of zeolite is rigid, whereas the enzyme is flexible. Phase-boundary catalytic (PBC) systems can be contrasted with conventional catalytic systems. PBC is primarily applicable to reactions at the interface of an aqueous phase and organic phase. In these cases, an approach such as PBC is needed due to the immiscibility of aqueous phases with most organic substrate. In PBC, the catalyst acts at the interface between the aqueous and organic phases. The reaction medium of phase boundary catalysis systems for the catalytic reaction of immiscible aqueous and organic phases consists of three phases; an organic liquid phase, containing most of the substrate, an aqueous liquid phase containing most of the substrate in aqueous phase and the solid catalyst.

=== Design of phase-boundary catalyst ===
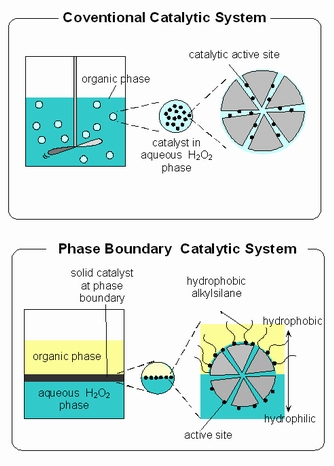
Schematic representation of the advantage of phase-boundary catalysis in comparison with conventional catalytic system.

A zeolite is treated with alkylsilane to render its surface hydrophobic. For examplex n-octadecyltrichlorosilane (OTS) has been used to modify W-Ti-NaY materials Due to the hydrophilicity of the w-Ti-NaY surface.

== Phase transfer agents (PTAs) ==
Not all phase transfer processes involve catalysis. A distinction can be made between phase-transfer catalysts (PTCs), which facilitate catalytic turnover between immiscible phases, and phase transfer agents (PTAs), which operate in stoichiometric or excess amounts to assist the movement of solutes between phases without participating in a catalytic cycle.

Phase transfer agents are typically surfactant-like molecules or ligands that aid in the extraction, stabilisation, or dispersion of compounds—particularly nanoparticles, ions, or polymers—between immiscible media such as water and organic solvents. Unlike PTCs, these agents are not regenerated and are often retained in the final product or dispersion medium.

Examples of PTAs include:

- Cetyltrimethylammonium bromide (CTAB) – often used to transfer metal nanoparticles from aqueous to organic media via bilayer or micellar encapsulation.
- Oleylamine (OAm) and octadecylamine (ODA) – long-chain primary amines used in nanochemistry for transferring and stabilising hydrophilic nanoparticles in nonpolar organic solvents.
- Crown ethers and polyethylenglycol (PEG) derivatives – in specific stoichiometric applications, these compounds can also act as phase transfer agents, especially in inorganic or polymer-related systems.

Phase transfer agents play a crucial role in the synthesis and processing of colloidal nanomaterials, hybrid polymers, and functional coatings. They are especially relevant in materials science contexts such as electrospinning, thin-film fabrication, and surface functionalisation, where precise control over dispersion and compatibility between components is essential.

== See also ==
- Ionic transfer
