= Quaternary ammonium cation =

Polyatomic ions of the form N(–R)4 (charge +1)

Quaternary ammonium cation. The R groups may be the same or different alkyl or aryl groups. Also, the R groups may be connected.

In organic chemistry, quaternary ammonium cations, also known as quats, are positively-charged polyatomic ions of the structure [NR_{4}]^{+}, where R is an alkyl group, an aryl group or organyl group. Unlike the ammonium ion (NH^{+}_{4}) and the primary, secondary, or tertiary ammonium cations, the quaternary ammonium cations are permanently charged, independent of the pH of their solution. Quaternary ammonium salts or quaternary ammonium compounds (called quaternary amines in oilfield parlance) are salts of quaternary ammonium cations. Polyquats are a variety of engineered polymer forms which provide multiple quat molecules within a larger molecule.

Quats are used in consumer applications including as antimicrobials (such as detergents and disinfectants), fabric softeners, and hair conditioners. As an antimicrobial, they are able to inactivate enveloped viruses (such as SARS-CoV-2). Quats tend to be gentler on surfaces than bleach-based disinfectants, and are generally fabric-safe.

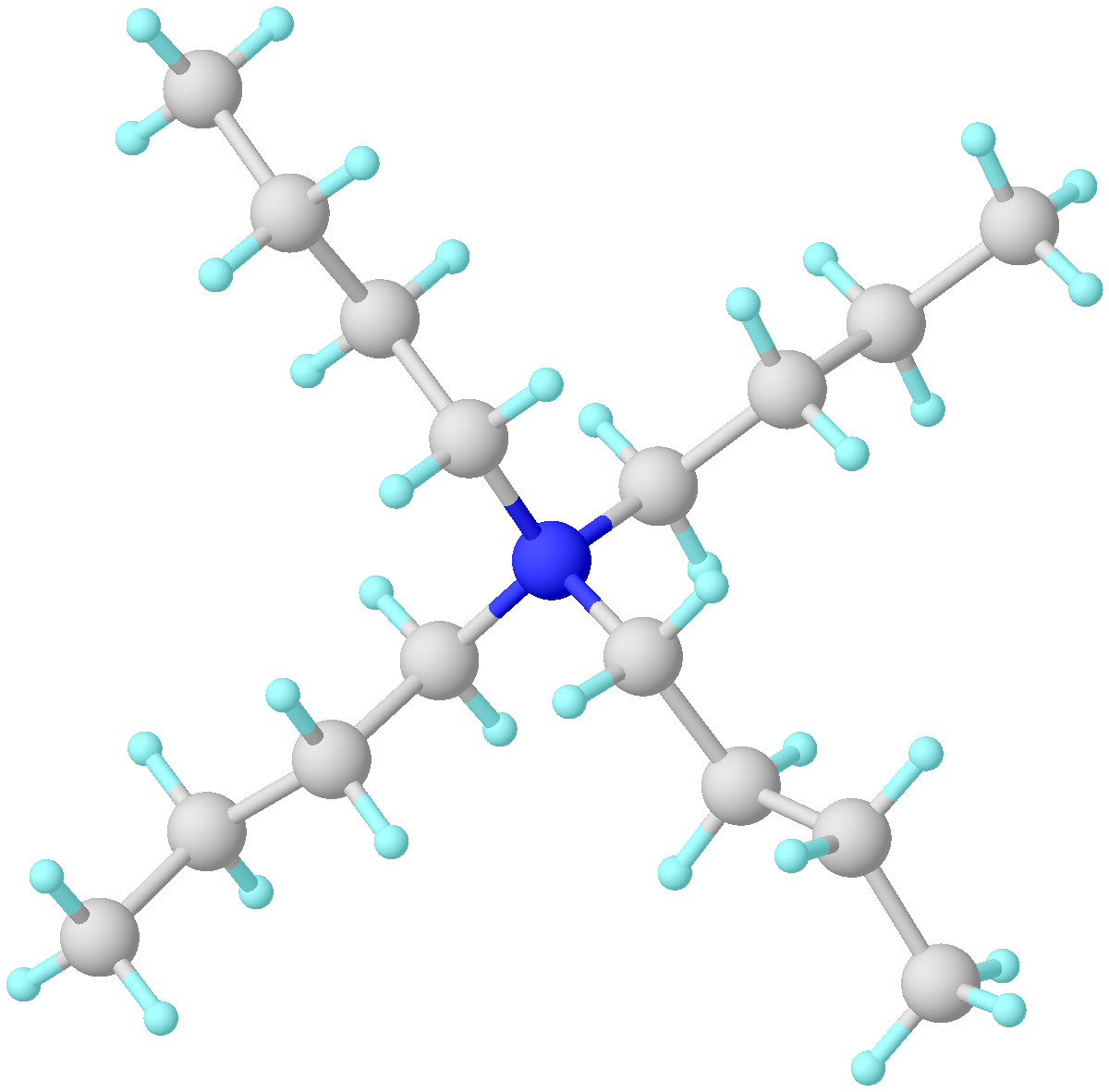
"Top" view of Bu_{4}N^{+} as determined by X-ray crystallography.

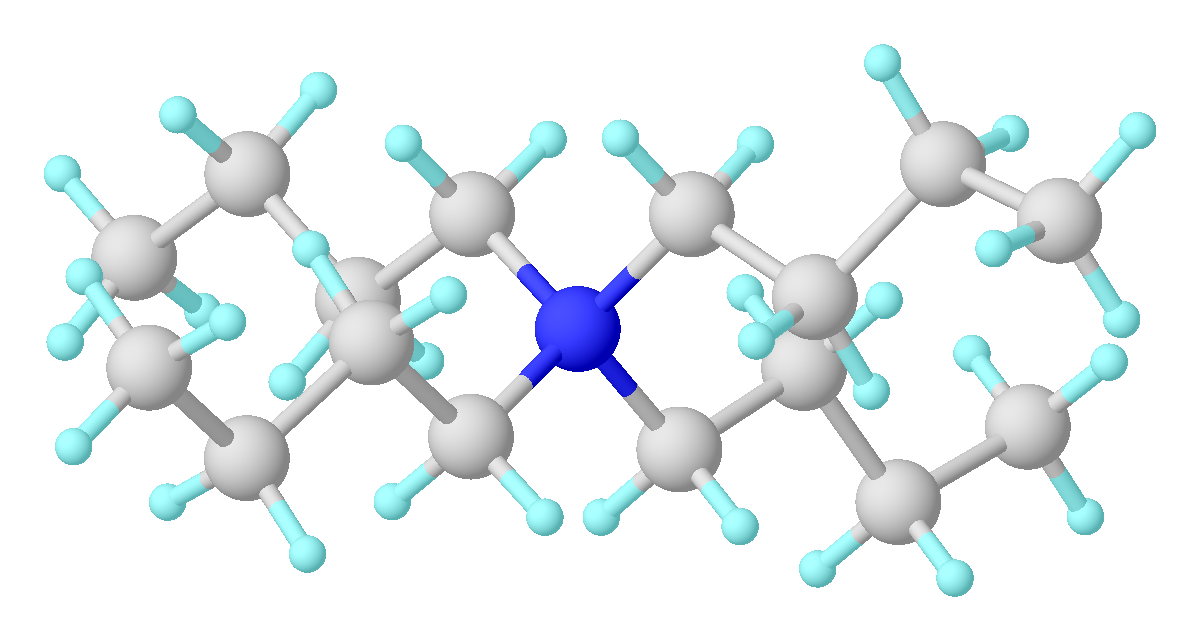
"Side" view of Bu_{4}N^{+} as determined by X-ray crystallography.

== Synthesis ==
Quaternary ammonium compounds are prepared by the alkylation of tertiary amine. Industrial production of commodity quat salts usually involves hydrogenation of fatty nitriles, which can generate primary or secondary amines. These amines are then treated with methyl chloride.

The quaternization of alkyl amines by alkyl halides is widely documented. In older literature this is often called a Menshutkin reaction, however modern chemists usually refer to it simply as quaternization. The reaction can be used to produce a compound with unequal alkyl chain lengths; for example when making cationic surfactants one of the alkyl groups on the amine is typically longer than the others. A typical synthesis is for benzalkonium chloride from a long-chain alkyldimethylamine and benzyl chloride:

CH_{3}(CH_{2})_{n}N(CH_{3})_{2} + ClCH_{2}C_{6}H_{5} → [CH_{3}(CH_{2})_{n}N(CH_{3})_{2}CH_{2}C_{6}H_{5}]^{+}Cl^{−}

== Reactions ==
Quaternary ammonium cations are unreactive toward even strong electrophiles, oxidants, and acids. They also are stable toward most nucleophiles. The latter is indicated by the stability of the hydroxide salts such as tetramethylammonium hydroxide and tetrabutylammonium hydroxide in solution, even at elevated temperatures. The halflife of Me_{4}NOH in 6M NaOH at 160 °C is >61 h. (The anhydrous compounds, lacking hydroxide counterion solvation, rapidly decompose at such temperatures via Hoffmann elimination.)

Because of their resilience, many unusual anions have been isolated as the quaternary ammonium salts. Examples include tetramethylammonium pentafluoroxenate, containing the highly reactive pentafluoroxenate (XeF^{−}_{5}) ion. Permanganate can be solubilized in organic solvents, when deployed as its NBu^{+}_{4} salt.

Quat cations degrade through dealkylation. In the simplest case, strong nucleophiles such as thiolates can induce intermolecular alkyl transfer. More commonly, base deprotonates the cation to give an ylide or zwitterion, which then decomposes through rearrangement or elimination. The former occurs in the Sommelet-Hauser and Stevens rearrangements; the latter in the Hofmann elimination and Emde degradation.

Benzalkonium chloride is a common type of quat salt used as a biocide, a cationic surfactant, and as a phase transfer agent. ADBACs are a mixture of alkylbenzyldimethylammonium chlorides, in which the alkyl group has various even-numbered alkyl chain lengths.

== Examples ==
- Tetramethylammonium ion: (CH_{3})_{4}N^{+}, also denoted Me_{4}N^{+} (Me = methyl group)
- Tetraethylammonium ion: (C_{2}H_{5})_{4}N^{+}, also denoted Et_{4}N^{+} (Et = ethyl group)
- Tetrapropylammonium ion: (n-C_{3}H_{7})_{4}N^{+}, also denoted Pr_{4}N^{+} (Pr = propyl group)
- Tetrabutylammonium ion: (n-C_{4}H_{9})_{4}N^{+}, also denoted Bu_{4}N^{+} (Bu = butyl group)

== Applications ==
Quaternary ammonium salts are used as disinfectants, surfactants, fabric softeners, and as antistatic agents (e.g. in shampoos). In liquid fabric softeners, the chloride salts are often used. In dryer anticling strips, the sulfate salts are often used. Older aluminium electrolytic capacitors and spermicidal jellies also contain quaternary ammonium salts. Quats are also used in contraception formulations, veterinary products, diagnostic testing, vaccine production, and nasal formulations.

Concerns have been raised about the level of understanding of safety profile of quat disinfectants on people. As of August 2020, half of disinfectants the United States Environmental Protection Agency suggested as effective against COVID-19 contained one of the quats, and often a quat as the sole ingredient. Salmonella and E. coli O157:H7 exposed to quats have developed cross resistance to antibiotics. A subject of concern is the potential effect of increased use of quats related to COVID-19 pandemic on antibiotic resistance in a larger microbial community in nature and engineered environment.

=== Medicines ===
Buscopan is one of many spasmolytics (anti-spasm drugs) that feature the quaternary ammonium functional group.

Quaternary ammonium compounds have antimicrobial activity. Quaternary ammonium compounds, especially those containing long alkyl chains, are used as antimicrobials and disinfectants. Examples are benzalkonium chloride, benzethonium chloride, methylbenzethonium chloride, cetalkonium chloride, cetylpyridinium chloride, cetrimonium, cetrimide, dofanium chloride, tetraethylammonium bromide, didecyldimethylammonium chloride and domiphen bromide. Also effective against fungi, amoebas, and enveloped viruses (such as SARS-CoV-2), most quaternary ammonium compounds are believed to act by disrupting the cell membrane or viral envelope. (Some QACs, such as dequalinium and similar bis-QACs, show evidence of a different mode of action.)

Quaternary ammonium compounds are lethal to a wide variety of organisms except endospores and non-enveloped viruses, both having no accessible membrane coat to attack. It is possible to solve the endospore problem by adding chemicals which force them to germinate. They have reduced efficacy against gram-negative bacteria, mycobacteria, and bacteria in biofilms due to them having additional layers that need to be penetrated or disrupted. Some bacteria such as MRSA have acquired resistance genes, qacA/B and qacC/D, that pump the cation out of the cell.

=== Phase transfer catalysts ===
In organic chemistry, quaternary ammonium salts are employed as phase transfer catalysts (PTCs). Such catalysts accelerate reactions between reagents dissolved in immiscible solvents. The highly reactive reagent dichlorocarbene is generated via PTC by reaction of chloroform and aqueous sodium hydroxide.

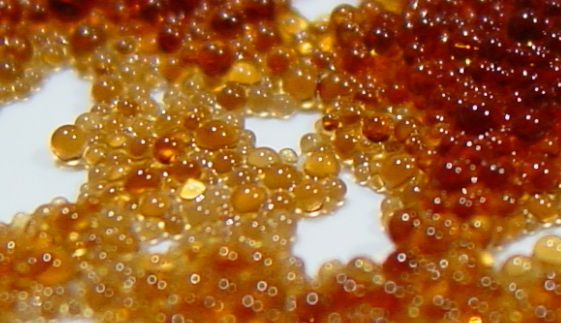
Anion exchange resins, in the form of beads, contain quaternary ammonium ions bound to a polymer.

=== Fabric softeners and hair conditioners ===
In the 1950s, distearyldimethylammonium chloride (DHTDMAC), was introduced as a fabric softener. This compound was discontinued because the cation biodegrades too slowly. Contemporary fabric softeners are based on salts of quaternary ammonium cations where the fatty acid is linked to the quaternary center via ester linkages; these are commonly referred to as betaine-esters or ester-quats and are susceptible to degradation, e.g., by hydrolysis. Characteristically, the cations contain one or two long alkyl chains derived from fatty acids linked to an ethoxylated ammonium salt. Other cationic compounds can be derived from imidazolium, guanidinium, substituted amine salts, or quaternary alkoxy ammonium salts.

Cationic surfactants used as fabric softeners

Distearyldimethylammonium chloride, an early generation fabric softener with low biodegradability that was phased out.

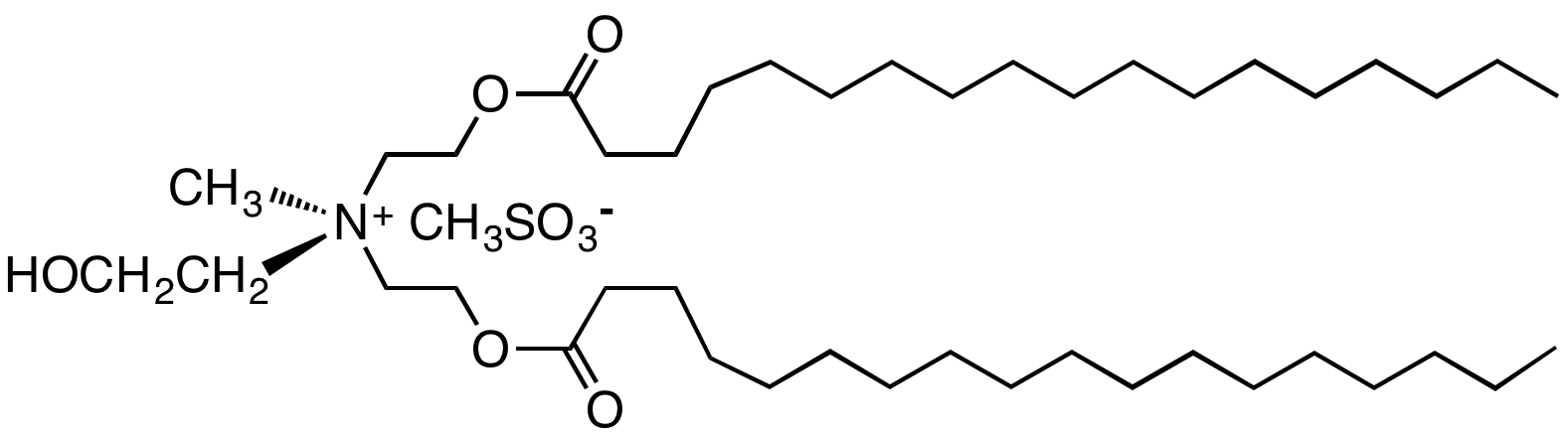
Another diesterquat, a contemporary fabric softener.

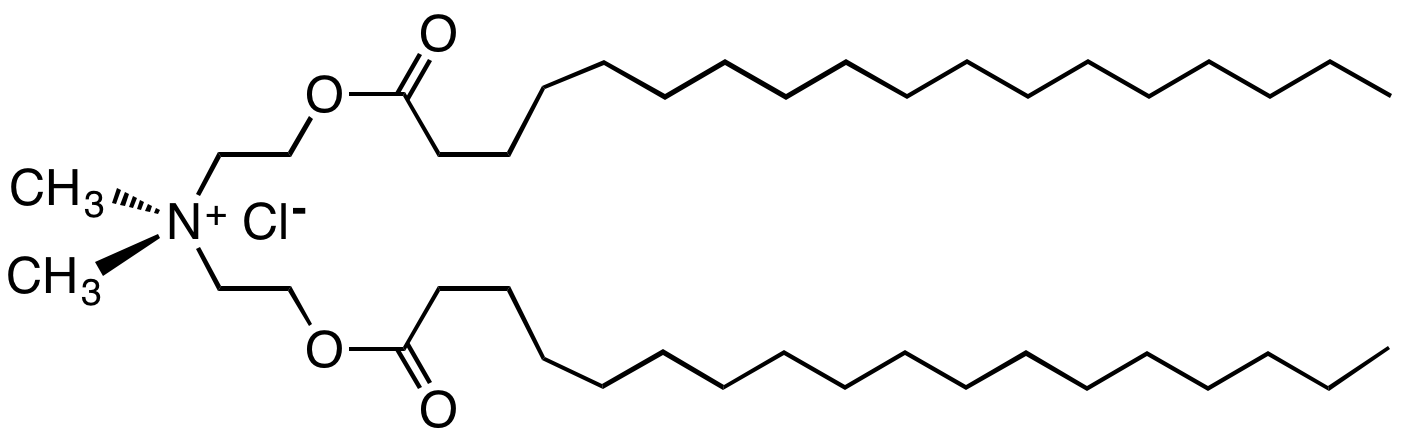
Diethyl ester dimethyl ammonium chloride used as a fabric softener.

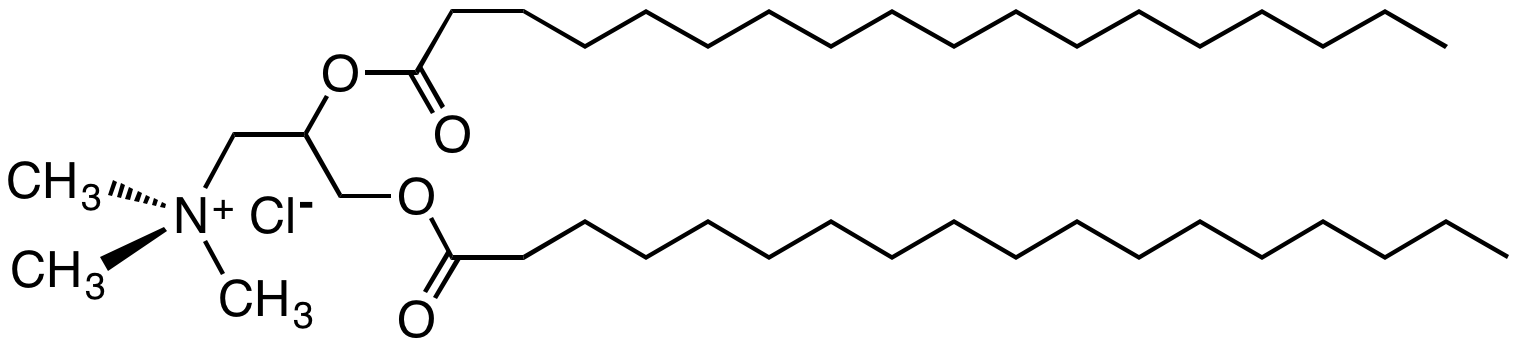
Another diesterquat used as a fabric softener.

The antistatic qualities that make quaternary ammonium salts useful as fabric softeners also make them useful in hair conditioners and shampoos. The idea was pioneered by Henkel with a 1984 patent. Examples include cetrimonium chloride and behentrimonium chloride.

=== Plant growth retardants ===
Cycocel (chlormequat chloride) reduces plant height by inhibiting the production of gibberellins, the primary plant hormones responsible for cell elongation. Therefore, their effects are primarily on stem, petiole, and flower stalk tissues. Lesser effects are seen in reductions of leaf expansion, resulting in thicker leaves with darker green color.

== Natural occurrence ==
Several quaternary ammonium derivatives exist in nature. Prominent examples include glycine betaine, choline, carnitine, butyrobetaine, homarine, and trigonelline. Glycine betaine, an osmolyte, stabilizes osmotic pressure in cells.

Glycine betaine is a naturally occurring quaternary ammonium cation. Its degradation product, trimethylamine, is responsible for the odor of spoiled fish.

Choline is a quat compound.

Choline is a precursor for the neurotransmitter acetylcholine. Choline is also a constituent of lecithin, which is present in many plants and animal organs. It is found in phospholipids. For example, phosphatidylcholines, a major component of biological membranes, are a member of the lecithin group of fatty substances in animal and plant tissues.

Carnitine participates in the digestion of fatty acid .

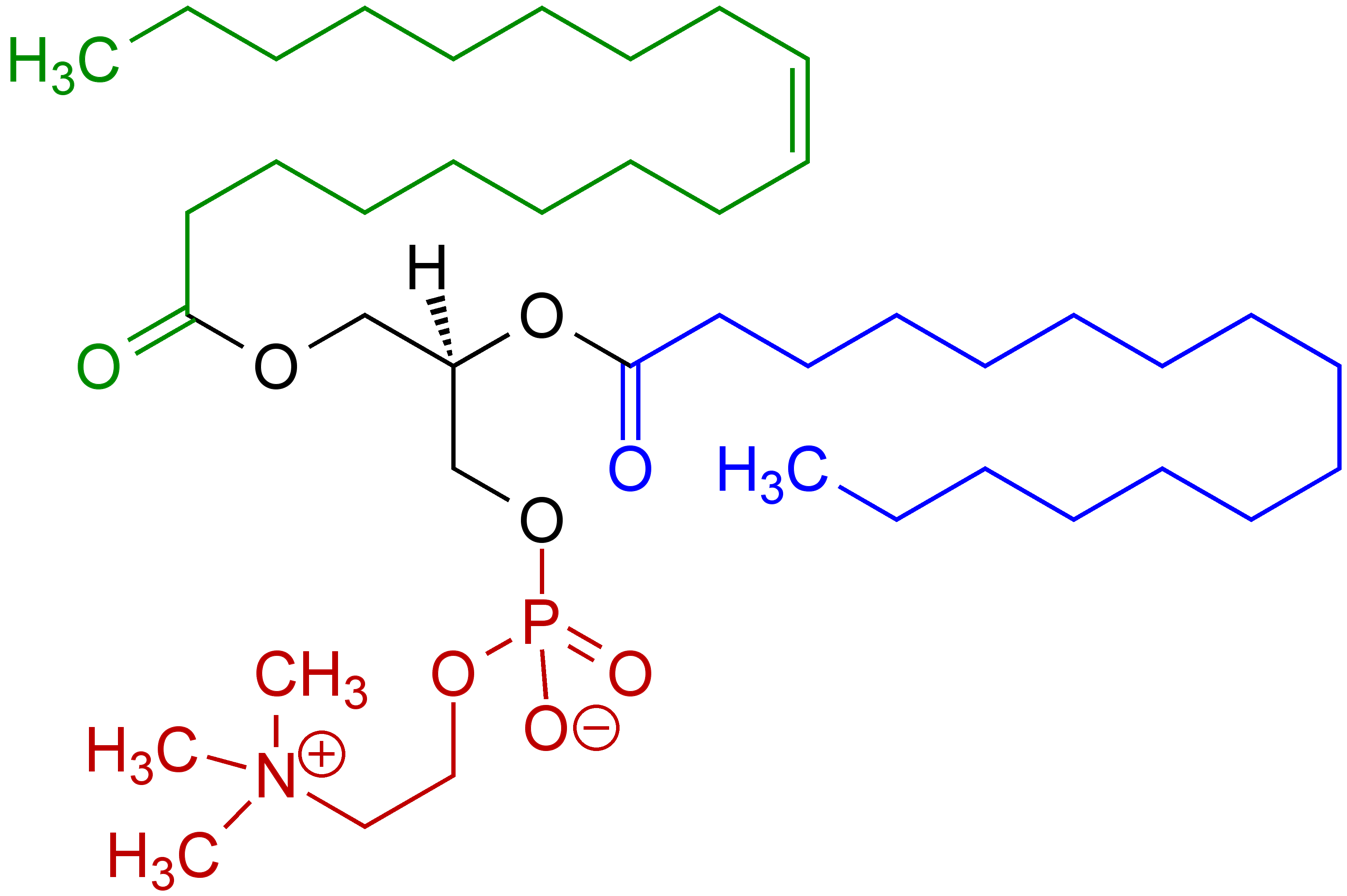
1-Oleoyl-2-palmitoyl-phosphatidylcholine

== Health effects ==
Quaternary ammonium compounds can display a range of health effects, amongst which are mild skin and respiratory irritation up to severe caustic burns on skin and the gastrointestinal wall (depending on concentration), gastrointestinal symptoms (e.g., nausea and vomiting), coma, convulsions, hypotension and death.

They are thought to be the chemical group responsible for anaphylactic reactions that occur with use of neuromuscular blocking drugs during general anaesthesia in surgery. Quaternium-15 is the single most often found cause of allergic contact dermatitis of the hands (16.5% in 959 cases).

=== Possible reproductive effects in laboratory animals ===
Quaternary ammonium-based disinfectants (Virex and Quatricide) were tentatively identified as the most probable cause of jumps in birth defects and fertility problems in caged lab mice. The quat ingredients in the disinfectants include alkyl dimethyl benzyl ammonium chloride (ADBAC) and didecyl dimethyl ammonium chloride (DDAC). A similar link was tentatively identified in nurses. The studies contradict earlier toxicology data reviewed by the U.S. Environmental Protection Agency (U.S. EPA) and the EU Commission.

== Quantification ==
The quantification of quaternary ammonium compounds can be challenging. Some methods include precipitation of solid salts with tetraphenylborate. Another method, an Epton titration, involves partitioning between water-chloroform in the presence of an anionic dye. Individual cations are detectable by ESI-MS and NMR spectroscopy.

== See also ==
- Ammonium
- Benzyltrimethylammonium fluoride
- Iminium
