= Tetramethylammonium sulfate =

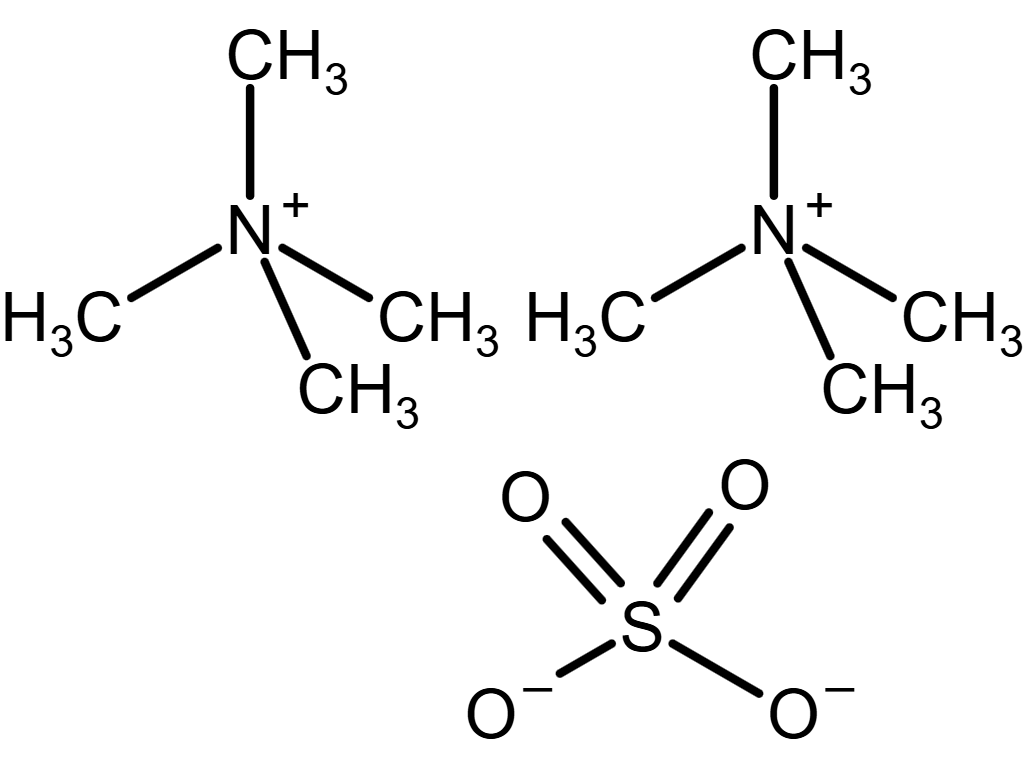

Names
- IUPAC name Bis(tetramethylazanium) sulfate
- Other names: Tetramethylammonium sulfate; Tetramethylammonium sulfate (2:1); Methanaminium, N,N,N-trimethyl-, sulfate (2:1); Bis(N,N,N-trimethylmethanaminium) sulfate; TMA-SO4

Identifiers
CAS Number	14190-16-0
3D model (JSmol)	Interactive image
ChemSpider	10650189
ECHA InfoCard	100.034.570
EC Number	238-043-4
PubChem CID	14746849
CompTox Dashboard (EPA)	DTXSID30931237
- InChI: InChI=1S/2C4H12N.H2O4S/c3*1-5(2,3)4/h2*1-4H3;(H2,1,2,3,4)/q2*+1;/p-2 Key: KJFVITRRNTVAPC-UHFFFAOYSA-L
- SMILES: C[N+](C)(C)C.C[N+](C)(C)C.[O-]S(=O)(=O)[O-]

Properties
Chemical formula	[N(CH_{3})_{4}]_{2}SO_{4}
Molar mass	244.35 g·mol^{−1}
Appearance	White hygroscopic crystalline powder
Melting point	285 °C (545 °F; 558 K) (decomposes)
Solubility in water	Soluble
Solubility	Soluble in polar organic solvents

Structure
Molecular shape	Tetrahedral at N and S

Hazards
- Occupational safety and health (OHS/OSH)
Main hazards	Serious eye damage and irritation
- GHS labelling
Pictograms	(GHS07: Exclamation mark)
Signal word	Warning
Hazard statements	H315, H319, H335
Precautionary statements	P261, P264, P264+P265, P271, P280, P302+P352, P304+P340, P305+P351+P338, P319, P321, P332+P317, P337+P317, P362+P364, P403+P233, P405, P501

Related compounds
Other anions	Tetramethylammonium nitrate; Tetramethylammonium chloride; Tetramethylammonium perchlorate; Tetramethylammonium cyanide
Other cations	Ammonium sulfate
- Except where otherwise noted, data are given for materials in their standard state (at 25 °C [77 °F], 100 kPa). Infobox references

Tetramethylammonium sulfate is a chemical compound with the chemical formula [N(CH_{3})_{4}]_{2}SO_{4}. It is a white hygroscopic crystalline powder. It is a quaternary ammonium salt. It consists of tetramethylammonium cations [N(CH_{3})_{4}]^{+} and sulfate anions SO^{2−}_{4}. It forms the tetrahydrate [N(CH_{3})_{4}]_{2}SO_{4}·4H_{2}O.

== Structure ==
Tetramethylammonium sulfate tetrahydrate is orthorhombic, with a space group of Pnam, with the lattice constants a = 15.438 Å, b = 13.832 Å, c = 7.923 Å at −26 °C (−15 °F). The crystal structure contains ordered tetramethylammonium cations in channels formed by hydrogen‐bonded chains of water molecules cross linked by interaction with the sulfate anions which are disordered.

== Synthesis ==
Tetramethylammonium sulfate can be synthesized by the reaction between tetramethylammonium hydroxide and sulfuric acid, followed by careful evaporation and crystallization.

2 [N(CH_{3})_{4}]OH + H_{2}SO_{4} → [N(CH_{3})_{4}]_{2}SO_{4} + 2 H_{2}O

== Uses ==
Tetramethylammonium sulfate is used as a phase transfer catalyst and in organic synthesis. It exhibits properties typical of quaternary ammonium compounds, such as being a surfactant and having antimicrobial activity.

Zinc metal is considered as a promising metal anode for aqueous rechargeable metal ion batteries due to its low electrochemical potential and high theoretical capacity. However, zinc metal suffers from hydrogen evolution reaction and dendrite growth during plating and stripping. A low-cost, effective and non-toxic electrolyte additive, tetramethylammonium sulfate, as a simple cationic surfactant additive for zinc-ion batteries is proposed, to trigger the smooth zinc deposition during battery charging and discharging. It is found that tetramethylammonium sulfate enables the deposition of zinc cations (Zn^{2+}) along the surface of zinc foil laterally without stacking and thus dendrite growth and side reactions are greatly avoided by the electrolyte additive of tetramethylammonium sulfate.
