= Green solvent =

Environmentally sustainable solvent

Green solvents are environmentally friendly chemical solvents that are used as a part of green chemistry. They came to prominence in 2015, when the UN defined a new sustainability-focused development plan based on 17 sustainable development goals, recognizing the need for green chemistry and green solvents for a more sustainable future. Green solvents are developed as more environmentally friendly solvents, derived from the processing of agricultural crops or otherwise sustainable methods as alternatives to petrochemical solvents. Some of the expected characteristics of green solvents include ease of recycling, ease of biodegradation, and low toxicity.

== Examples ==
=== Water ===
Although not an organic solvent, water is an attractive solvent because it its non-toxic and renewable. It is a useful solvent in many industrial processes. Traditional organic solvents can sometimes be replaced by aqueous preparations. Water-based coatings have largely replaced standard petroleum-based paints for the construction industry; however, solvent-based anti-corrosion paints remain among the most used today.

Supercritical water (SCW) is obtained at a temperature of 374.2 °C and a pressure of 22.05 MPa. It behaves as a dense gas with a dissolving power equivalent to that of organic solvents of low polarity. However, the solubility of inorganic salts in SCW is radically reduced. SCW is used as a reaction medium, especially in oxidation processes for the destruction of toxic substances such as those found in industrial aqueous effluents. The use of supercritical water has two main technical challenges, namely corrosion and salt deposition.

=== Supercritical carbon dioxide ===
Supercritical carbon dioxide (CO_{2}) is the most commonly used supercritical fluid because of its relatively easy to use. Temperatures above 31 °C and pressures above 7.38 MPa are sufficient to obtain supercriticality, at which point it behaves as a good nonpolar solvent.

=== Alcohols and esters ===
Ethanol is used in toiletries, cosmetics, some cleaners and coatings. Bioethanol, made industrially by fermentation of sugars, starch, and cellulose is widely available.

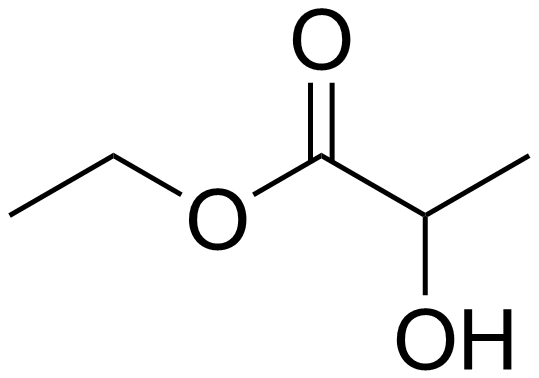
Ethyl lactate, used as a paint additive

Biobutanol (butyl alcohol, various isomers) is also produced by fermentation of sugars.

Tetrahydrofurfuryl alcohol (THFA) is a specialty solvent that may be obtained from hemicellulose.

Ethyl lactate, made from lactic acid obtained from corn starch, is notably used as a mixture with other solvents in some paint strippers and cleaners. Ethyl lactate has replaced solvents such as toluene, acetone, and xylene in some applications.

=== Lipid-derived solvents ===
Fatty acid methyl ester synthesis

Lipids include a broad range of nonpolar substances of biological origin, of which triglycerides (TGs) such as those found in refined vegetable oil are the cheapest and most abundant. TGs themselves can be used as solvents, but are mostly hydrolyzed to fatty acids and glycerol (glycerin). Fatty acids can be esterified with an alcohol to give fatty acid esters, e.g., FAMEs (fatty acid methyl esters) if the esterification is performed with methanol. Usually derived from natural gas or petroleum, the methanol used to produce FAMEs can also be obtained by other routes, including gasification of biomass and household hazardous waste. Glycerol from lipid hydrolysis can be used as a solvent in synthetic chemistry, as can some of its derivatives.

=== Deep eutectic solvents ===
Deep eutectic solvents (DES) have low melting points, can be cheap, safe and useful in industries. One example is octylammonium bromide/decanoic acid (molar ratio of [1:2]) has a lower density compared to water of 0.8889 g.cm^{−3}, up to 1.4851 g.cm^{−3} for choline chloride/trifluoroacetamine [1:2]. Their miscibility is also composition-dependent.

A mixture whose melting point is lower than that of the constituents is called an eutectic mixture. Many such mixtures can be used as solvents, especially when the melting-point depression is very large, hence the term deep eutectic solvent (DES). One of the most commonly used substances to obtain DES is the ammonium salt choline chloride. Smith, Abbott, and Ryder report that a mixture of urea (melting point: 133 °C) and choline chloride (melting point: 302 °C) in a 2:1 molar ratio has a melting point of 12 °C.

Natural deep eutectic solvents (NADES) are also a research area relevant to green chemistry, being easy to produce from two low-cost and well-known ecotoxicity components, a hydrogen-bond acceptor, and a hydrogen-bond donor.

=== Terpenes ===
D-Limonene, a terpene

Solvents in a diverse class of natural substances called terpenes are obtained by extraction from certain parts of plants. All terpenes are structurally presented as multiples of isoprene with the gross formula (C_{5}H_{8})_{n}.

- D-limonene, a monoterpene, is one of the best known solvents in this class, as is turpentine.
- D-limonene is extracted from citrus peels while turpentine is obtained from pine trees (sap, stump) and as a by-product of the Kraft paper-making process (Sell, 2006).
- Turpentine is a mixture of terpenes whose composition varies according to its origin and production method. In Canada and the United States, a range of mass concentrations of 40 to 65% α-pinene, 20 to 35% β-pinene, and 2 to 20% d-limonene are found.
- α-pinene can replace n-hexane for the extraction of vegetable oil, and as a substitute solvent for extracting molecules such as carotenoids used as food additives.

Turpentine, formerly used as a solvent in organic coatings, is now largely replaced by petroleum hydrocarbons. Nowadays, it is mainly used as a source of its constituents, including α-pinene and β-pinene.

=== Ionic liquids ===
1-Ethyl-3-methylimidazolium acetate, an ionic liquid

Ionic liquids are molten organic salts that are generally fluid at room temperature. Frequently used cations, include imidazolium, pyridinium, ammonium and phosphonium. Anionis include halides, tetrafluoroborate, hexafluorophosphate, and nitrate. Most ionic liquids are non-flammable, and chemically, electrochemically and thermally stable. These properties allow for ionic liquids to be used as green solvents, as their low volatility limits VOC emissions compared to conventional solvents. The ecotoxicity and poor degradability of ionic liquids has been recognized in the past because the resources typically used for their production are non-renewable, as is the case for imidazole and halogenated alkanes (derived from petroleum). Ionic liquids produced from renewable and biodegradable materials have recently emerged, but their availability is low because of high production costs.

=== Switchable solvents ===
Bubbling CO_{2} into water or an organic solvent results in changes to certain properties of the liquid such as its polarity, ionic strength, and hydrophilicity. This allows an organic solvent to form a homogeneous mixture with the otherwise immiscible water. This process is reversible, and was developed by Jessop et al. (2012) for potential uses in synthetic chemistry, extraction and separation of various substances. The degree of how green switchable solvents are is measured by the energy and material savings it provides; thus, one of the advantages of switchable solvents is the potential reuse of solvent and water in post-process applications.

The properties of switchable solvents are caused by the strength of their conjugate acid's pKa and octanol-water partition coefficient ratio K_{ow.} They must have a pKa above 9.5 to be protonated by carbonated water and also a log(K_{ow}) between 1.2 and 2.5 to be switchable, otherwise they will be hydrophilic or hydrophobic. These properties depend on the volumetric ratio of the compound compared to water. For example, N,N,N′-Tributylpentanamidine is a switchable solvent, and for a volumetric ratio of compound to water of 2:1, it has a log(K_{ow})= 5.99, which is higher than 2.5.

=== Solvents from waste materials ===
2-Methyltetrahydrofuran, a solvent derived from waste plant matter

First-generation biorefineries exploit food-based substances such as starch and vegetable oils. For example, corn grain is used to make ethanol.

Second-generation biorefineries use residues or wastes generated by various industries as feedstock for the manufacture of their solvents. 2-Methyltetrahydrofuran, derived from lignocellulosic waste, would have the potential to replace tetrahydrofuran, toluene, DCM, and diethyl ether in some applications. Levulinic acid esters from the same source would have the potential to replace DCM in paint cleaners and strippers.

Used cooking oils can be used to produce FAMEs. Glycerol, obtained as a byproduct of the synthesis of these, can in turn be used to produce various solvents such as 2,2-dimethyl-1,3-dioxolane-4-methanol, usable as a solvent in the formulation of inks and cleaners.

Fusel oil, an isomeric mixture of amyl alcohol, is a byproduct of ethanol production from sugars. Green solvents derived from fusel oil such as isoamyl acetate or isoamyl methyl carbonate could be obtained. When these green solvents are used to manufacture nail polishes, VOC emissions report a minimum reduction of 68% compared to the emissions caused by using traditional solvents.

=== Petrochemical solvents with green characteristics ===
Due to the high price of new sustainable solvents, in 2017, Clark et al. listed twenty-five solvents that are currently considered acceptable to replace hazardous solvents, even if they are derived from petrochemicals.

Parachlorobenzotrifluoride (PCBTF), a petrochemical solvent used in paints

These include propylene carbonate and dibasic esters (DBEs). Propylene carbonate and DBEs have been the subject of monographs on solvent substitution. Propylene carbonate and two DBEs are considered green in the manufacturer GlaxoSmithKline's (GSK) Solvent Sustainability Guide, which is used in the pharmaceutical industry. Propylene carbonate can be produced from renewable resources, but DBEs that have appeared on the market in recent years are obtained as by-products of the synthesis of polyamides, derived from petroleum. Other petrochemical solvents are variously referred to as green solvents, such as halogenated hydrocarbons like parachlorobenzotrifluoride, which has been used since the early 1990s in paints to replace smog-forming solvents.

Siloxanes are compounds known in industry in the form of polymers (silicones, R-SiO-R'), for their thermal stability and elastic and non-stick properties. The early 1990s saw the emergence of low molecular weight siloxanes (methylsiloxanes), which can be used as solvents in precision cleaning, replacing stratospheric ozone-depleting solvents.

A final category of petrochemical solvents that qualify as green involves polymeric solvents. The International Union of Pure and Applied Chemistry defines the term "polymer solvent" as "a polymer that acts as a solvent for low-molecular weight compounds". In industrial chemistry, polyethylene glycols (PEGs, H(OCH_{2}CH_{2})_{n}OH) are one of the most widely used polymeric solvent families. PEGs, with molecular weights below 600 Da, are viscous liquids at room temperature, while heavier PEGs are waxy solids.

Soluble in water and readily biodegradable, liquid PEGs have the advantage of negligible volatility (< 0.01 mmHg or < 1.3 Pa at 20 °C). PEGs are synthesized from ethylene glycol and ethylene oxide, both of which are petrochemical-derived molecules, though ethylene glycol from renewable sources (cellulose) is commercially available.

== Physical properties ==
The physical properties of solvents are important in identifying the solvent used according to the reaction conditions. In particular, their dissolution properties make it possible to assess the use of a particular solvent for a chemical reaction, such as an extraction or a washing. Evaporation is also important to consider, as it can be indicative of the potential volatile organic compound (VOC) emissions.

The following table shows selected properties of green solvents in each category:

Classification	Solvent	Molar mass (g·mol^{−1})	Solubility in water (at 25 °C)	Melting point (°C)	Boiling point (°C)	Density (g/mL)	Dielectric constant	Appearance	Vapor pressure	Viscosity
Water	Water	18		0	100	1.000 at 3.98 °C	78.304 at 25 °C	colorless	23.8 mmHg at 25 °C	0.8949 cP·s at 25 °C
Solvents derived from carbohydrates	Ethyl lactate	118.13	Fully Miscible	–26	154	1.03	15.7	colorless	0.22 kPa at 20 °C 17 kPa at 100 °C	0.428 cP·s at 25 °C
Solvents derived from carbohydrates	Ethanol	46.07	10^{6} mg/mL	–114.14	78.24	0.7893 at 20 °C	24.5	colorless	10 kPa at 29.2 °C	1.074 mPa·s at 25 °C
Solvents from waste materials	2-Methyltetrahydrofuran	86.13	150 g/L	–136	80	0.85 at 20 °C		colorless	13.6 kPa at 20 °C 34,5kPa at 50 °C	4 mPa·s at 25 °C
Solvents from waste materials	Levulinic acid	116.11	6.746·10^{5} mg/L	33	245.5	1.134 at 25 °C		solid: large crystal liquid: yellow to brown	2.984 kPa at 156.85 °C	14.26 mPa·s at 40 °C
Solvents obtained by extraction	Limonene	136.23	14 mg/L	−74.35	177~178	0.8402 at 20.85 °C	2.3746	colorless	1.55 mmHg at 25 °C	0.897 mPa·s at 25.15 °C
Petrochemical solvents	Propylene carbonate	102.09	1.75·10^{5} mg/L	–48.8	241.6	1.204 at 25 °C		colorless	0.13 mmHg at 20 °C	

Fatty acid methyl esters have been investigated and compared to fossil diesel. At 20 °C or 40 °C, those solvents have a lower density than water at 4 °C (temperature in which the water is the densest):

- $d_{4}^{40}$: from 0.9079 (acetate) to 0.8488 (arachidate);
- $d_{4}^{20}$: from 0.9338 (acetate) to 0.8663 (pentadecanoate).

Their kinematic viscosity depends if they are saturated or unsaturated or even the temperature. At 40 °C, for saturated FAMEs, it goes from 0.340 (acetate) to 6.39 (nonadecanoate), and for unsaturated FAMEs, it goes from 5.61 for the stearate to 7.21 for the erucate.

Their dielectric constant decreases as their alkyl chain gets longer. For example, acetate has a tiny alkyl chain and has a dielectric constant of ε^{40}= 6.852 and ε^{40}= 2.982 for the nonadecanoate.

Ionic liquids with low melting points are associated with asymmetric cations, and liquids with high melting point are associated with symmetric cations. Additionally, if they have branched alkyl chains, they will have a higher melting point. They are more dense than water, ranging from 1.05 to 1.64 g·cm^{−3} at 20 °C and from 1.01 to 1.57 at 90 °C.

== Applications ==
Some green solvents, in addition to being more sustainable, have been found to have more efficient physicochemical properties or reaction yields than when using traditional solvents. However, the results obtained are for the most part observations from experiments on particular green solvents and cannot be generalized. The effectiveness of a green solvent is quantified by calculating the "E factor", which is a ratio of waste materials to desired product produced through a process.

$E factor=\frac{\text{Mass of all waste materials}}{\text{Mass of desired product}}$

=== Organic synthesis ===
Green solvent efficiency has mainly been proven in extractions and separations in comparison to traditional solvents.

- Supercritical CO_{2} is largely used in the food industry as an extraction solvent. Among other processes like flavoring agents, fragrances, essential oils, or lipid extraction from plants, sc-CO_{2} is a green substitute to dichloromethane in coffee decaffeination, avoiding the use of a hazardous solvent and additional synthesis steps. Sc-CO_{2} can also apply to polymerization reactions, specifically in PTFE formation to manipulate monomers safely and avoid explosive reactions of peroxide with dioxygen. Although the original process involves water, a green solvent itself, sc-CO_{2} allows less waste materials.
- In deep eutectic solvents, observations report that the higher the solvent's hydrophobicity, the higher the extraction efficiency of neonicotinoids from aqueous solutions, although the exact trend has not been established yet. Additionally, the creation of a biphasic system is easier to achieve. In 2015, several hydrophobic DES composed of highly hydrophobic hydrogen bond donors were reported, one of them being decanoic acid with a quaternary ammonium salt, and a fatty acid as a hydrogen bond acceptor.
- The pharmaceutical industry intends to substitute their solvents for greener options, emphasized as solvent use in active substance synthesis is important, which aggrandizes solvents with a high boiling point. Solvent must generally be evaporated at the end of a chemical reaction, hence the insistence on low-boiling solvents in order to minimize the energy required for its removal by distillation.

=== Industrial chemistry ===
- Ethyl lactate has uses in cleaning metal surfaces, removing greases, oils, adhesives and solid fuels. They are included in aqueous preparations used for industrial degreasing, coatings, adhesives and inks.
- Fatty acid methyl esters (FAMEs) have been used as a reactive diluent in coatings for continuous metal strip coating (e.g., the interior coating of food cans), reducing the amount of volatile solvent in this type of coating and lowering its overall toxicity.
- Tetrahydrofurfuryl alcohol (THFA) mixtures with other green solvents are studied for their cleaning properties. As an example, the mixture of THFA with FAME and ethyl lactate has been patented as a paint stripper.
- Ionic liquids particularly have applications in electrodeposition. Their relevance as green solvents is further enhanced by the emergence of production methods based on renewable and biodegradable resources.

Solvent manufacturers also provide industrial companies with databases to propose green alternative solvent mixtures to those originally used in industrial processes with similar efficiency and reaction yield. However, environmental and safety requirements are not always considered in these suggestions.

== Safety ==
The use of green solvents is increasingly preferred because of their lower harm to human health and environmental impact. This does not mean they are harmless; the reduced harm remains a good reason for caution. In addition, for a number of green solvents, their impact is still unclear, or at least, not categorized yet.

Listed here is selected information from the safety data sheets of common green solvents:

Solvents	Pictograms	Hazards
Ethyl lactate		Flammable liquid and vapors Causes severe eye damage. May irritate the respiratory tract
Ethanol		Highly flammable liquid and vapors Causes severe eye irritation
2-Methyltetrahydrofuran		Highly flammable liquid and vapors Harmful if swallowed. Causes skin irritation and severe eye damage
Levulinic acid		Harmful if swallowed. Causes skin irritation Causes severe eye irritation
Limonene		Flammable liquid and vapors Causes skin irritation. May cause skin allergy Very toxic to aquatic organisms, causes long-term adverse effects
Propylene carbonate		

=== Solvents derived from carbohydrates ===
For ethanol, the American Conference of Governmental Industrial Hygienists, shortened ACGIH, advises a short-term exposure limit of 1000 ppm to avoid irritating the respiratory tract.

The French National Agency for Food, Environmental, and Occupational Health Safety (ANSES) has recommended a short-term occupational exposure limit value of 100 mg/m^{3} for butan-1-ol, a solvent used in paints, cleaners, and degreasers, in order to prevent irritation of the mucous membranes of the eyes and upper airways. Since 1998, the ACGIH has suggested an 8-hour exposure limit value (ELV) of 20 ppm of butan-1-ol to prevent irritation of the upper respiratory tract and eyes.

Male rats exposed to THFA develop reproductive toxicity. Moreover, it has an impact on fetal and embryonic development in rats. The American Industrial Hygiene Association suggested an ELV of 2 ppm for THFA to prevent testicular degeneration in 1993 based on the No-observed-effect level of two subchronic investigations in rats and dogs

=== Deep eutectic solvents ===
Individual DES components are typically non-toxic. However, their combination into a DES produces a higher toxicity for bacteria, fungi, fish, Artemia (brime shrimp), Hydra, and cultured mammal cells compared to the individual components; a case of synergy. The toxicity of DES to naked, individual cells is a natural consequence of its physiochemical properties: what allows it to work as a good solvent also enables it to disrupt cell membranes. So-called natural deep eutectic solvents (NADES) may be less toxic to these forms of life.

Both individual DES components and the resulting mixtures (tested so far) are highly biodegradable.

== Regulation ==
=== Legislation ===
Due to the recency of green solvent development, few laws related to their regulation have been developed beyond standard workplace safety precautions already in place, and laws that enforce the use of green solvents have not been widespread.
