= Tetramethylammonium perchlorate =

Identifiers
CAS Number	2537-36-2
3D model (JSmol)	Interactive image
ChemSpider	16407
ECHA InfoCard	100.018.005
EC Number	219-805-5
PubChem CID	17337
UNII	6K76T85VMQ
CompTox Dashboard (EPA)	DTXSID5062502
- InChI: InChI=1S/C4H12N.ClHO4/c1-5(2,3)4;2-1(3,4)5/h1-4H3;(H,2,3,4,5)/q+1;/p-1 Key: ZCWKIFAQRXNZCH-UHFFFAOYSA-M
- SMILES: C[N+](C)(C)C.[O-]Cl(=O)(=O)=O

Properties
Chemical formula	(CH_{3})_{4}NClO_{4}
Molar mass	173.59 g·mol^{−1}
Appearance	White crystalline powder
Melting point	300 °C

Hazards
- GHS labelling
Pictograms	(GHS03: Oxidizing) (GHS06: Toxic) (GHS07: Exclamation mark) (GHS08: Health hazard) (GHS09: Environmental hazard)
Signal word	Danger
Hazard statements	H272, H300, H311, H315, H319, H335, H370, H373, H411
Precautionary statements	P210, P220, P221, P260, P264, P270, P271, P273, P280, P301+P310, P302+P352, P304+P340, P305+P351+P338, P307+P311, P312, P314, P321, P322, P330, P332+P313, P337+P313, P361, P362, P363, P370+P378, P391, P403+P233, P405, P501
NFPA 704 (fire diamond)	2 1 3 OX

Related compounds
Other anions	Tetramethylammonium nitrate; Tetramethylammonium chloride; Tetramethylammonium sulfate
Other cations	Tetraethylammonium perchlorate
- Except where otherwise noted, data are given for materials in their standard state (at 25 °C [77 °F], 100 kPa). Infobox references

Tetramethylammonium perchlorate is a perchlorate salt with a chemical formula [(CH_{3})_{4}N]ClO_{4}. It is a white crystalline powder. It is a quaternary ammonium salt. It consists of tetramethylammonium cations [(CH_{3})_{4}N]^{+} and perchlorate anions ClO^{−}_{4}.

== Preparation ==
Tetramethylammonium perchlorate can be produced by mixing cold tetramethylammonium hydroxide with cold, dilute perchloric acid, the reaction leads to a white precipitation.

[(CH_{3})_{4}N]OH + HClO_{4} → [(CH_{3})_{4}N]ClO_{4} + H_{2}O

== Uses ==
The perchlorate is used as an intermediate in organic synthesis, in chromatography and as a supporting electrolyte in electrochemistry. Along with trimethylammonium perchlorate, it was investigated as a component in composite propellants during the Cold War, but without much success.
