= Tetramethylammonium-corrinoid protein Co-methyltransferase =

Identifiers
- EC no.: 2.1.1.252

Databases
- IntEnz: IntEnz view
- BRENDA: BRENDA entry
- ExPASy: NiceZyme view
- KEGG: KEGG entry
- MetaCyc: metabolic pathway
- PRIAM: profile
- PDB structures: RCSB PDB PDBe PDBsum
Search
- PMC: articles
- PubMed: articles
- NCBI: proteins

Tetramethylammonium-corrinoid protein Co-methyltransferase (EC 2.1.1.252, mtqB (gene), tetramethylammonium methyltransferase) is an enzyme with systematic name tetramethylammonium:5-hydroxybenzimidazolylcobamide Co-methyltransferase. This enzyme catalyses the following chemical reaction

tetramethylammonium + [Co(I) tetramethylammonium-specific corrinoid protein] $\rightleftharpoons$ [methyl-Co(III) tetramethylammonium-specific corrinoid protein] + trimethylamine

This enzyme is involved in methanogenesis from tetramethylammonium.
