= Aurosilane =

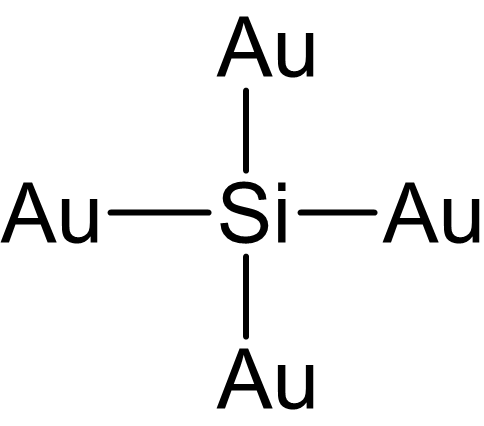

Names
- IUPAC name Tetraaurosilane
- Other names Silicon tetraauride

Identifiers
CAS Number	12421-46-4
3D model (JSmol)	Interactive image
- InChI: InChI=1S/4Au.Si Key: HAWKSDAOUYSVMB-UHFFFAOYSA-N
- SMILES: [Au][Si]([Au])([Au])[Au]

Properties
Chemical formula	SiAu_{4}
Molar mass	675.159

Related compounds
Other anions	silane
Other cations	caesium auride
- Except where otherwise noted, data are given for materials in their standard state (at 25 °C [77 °F], 100 kPa). Infobox references

Aurosilane is an inorganic compound with a chemical formula of SiAu_{4}. In this compound, gold acts as an electron acceptor with a valence of –1. Aurosilane has been isolated as a type of gold silane. Its unit cell parameters are a = 5.658, c = 5.605 A. The LUMO and the four Si-Au bonding orbitals of SiAu_{4} are similar to those of SiH_{4}.

In addition, silicon can also form other compounds with gold such as Si_{3}Au_{3}.

== External reading ==
- Pyykkö, Pekka (October 2002). "Relativity, Gold, Closed-Shell Interactions, and CsAu⋅NH_{3}". Angewandte Chemie International Edition. 41 (19): 3573–3578. doi:10.1002/1521-3773(20021004)41:19<3573::AID-ANIE3573>3.0.CO;2-R. PMID 12370896.
- Wang, Lai-Sheng (2010). "Covalent gold" (PDF). Physical Chemistry Chemical Physics. 12 (31): 8694–8705. Bibcode:2010PCCP...12.8694W. doi:10.1039/c003886e. PMID 20567749. Archived from the original (PDF) on 2016-03-04.
