= Tetramethylammonium nitrate =

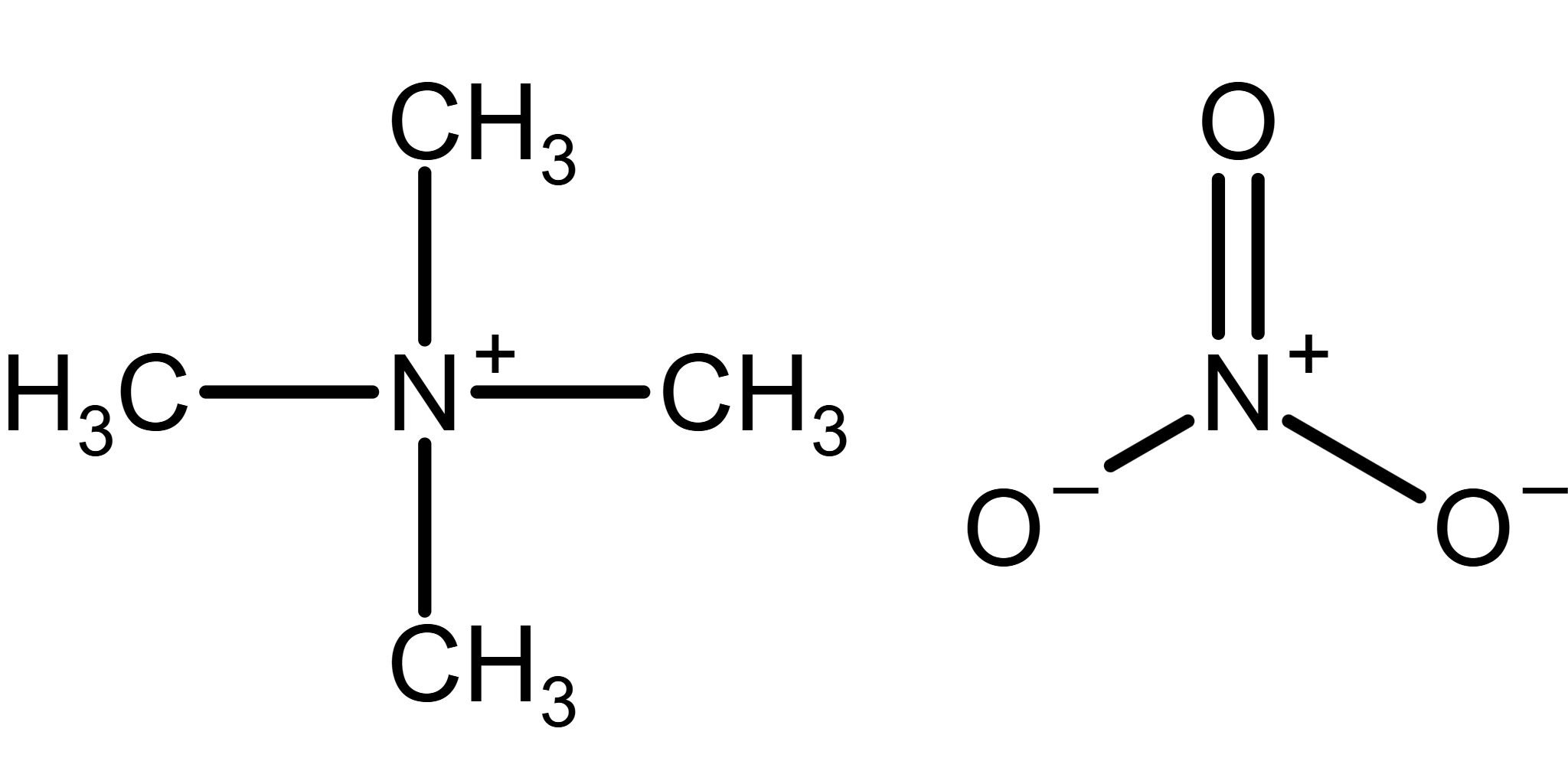

Names
- IUPAC name Tetramethylazanium nitrate
- Other names Methanaminium, N,N,N-trimethyl-, nitrate (1:1)

Identifiers
CAS Number	1941-24-8
3D model (JSmol)	Interactive image
ChemSpider	67315
ECHA InfoCard	100.016.113
EC Number	217-723-4
PubChem CID	74743
CompTox Dashboard (EPA)	DTXSID8062074
- InChI: InChI=1S/C4H12N.NO3/c1-5(2,3)4;2-1(3)4/h1-4H3;/q+1;-1 Key: QGPVYHSXZFOSRL-UHFFFAOYSA-N
- SMILES: C[N+](C)(C)C.[N+](=O)([O-])[O-]

Properties
Chemical formula	[N(CH_{3})_{4}]NO_{3}
Molar mass	136.151 g·mol^{−1}
Appearance	White crystalline solid
Odor	Odorless
Melting point	300 °C (572 °F; 573 K)
Solubility in water	0.1 g/mL

Hazards
- GHS labelling
Pictograms	(GHS03: Oxidizing) (GHS07: Exclamation mark)
Signal word	Danger
Hazard statements	H272, H315, H319, H335
Precautionary statements	P210, P220, P261, P264, P264+P265, P271, P280, P302+P352, P304+P340, P305+P351+P338, P319, P321, P332+P317, P337+P317, P362+P364, P370+P378, P403+P233, P405, P501
NFPA 704 (fire diamond)	2 1 1 OX

Related compounds
Other anions	Tetramethylammonium perchlorate; Tetramethylammonium chloride; Tetramethylammonium sulfate
Other cations	Tetraethylammonium nitrate
- Except where otherwise noted, data are given for materials in their standard state (at 25 °C [77 °F], 100 kPa). Infobox references

Tetramethylammonium nitrate is an organic compound with the chemical formula [N(CH_{3})_{4}]NO_{3}. It is a white crystalline solid. It is a quaternary ammonium salt. Tetramethylammonium nitrate consists of tetramethylammonium cations [N(CH_{3})_{4}]^{+} and nitrate anions NO^{−}_{3}.

== Uses ==
Tetramethylammonium nitrate is used as a glycolate oxidase inhibitor.

It is also used, together with trifluoromethanesulfonic anhydride, to selectively and rapidly nitrate cyclic (number of atoms in the ring is 5 or 6), aromatic and heteroaromatic compounds in dichloromethane as a solvent. An advantage is the removal of undesired byproducts. This very mild nitration is used for large-scale syntheses and gives high product yields that often require no further purification.

== Reactions ==
At high temperatures, tetramethylammonium nitrate decomposes to trimethylamine and methyl nitrate.

[N(CH_{3})_{4}]NO_{3} → N(CH_{3})_{3} + CH_{3}NO_{3}
