= Tetramethylammonium auride =

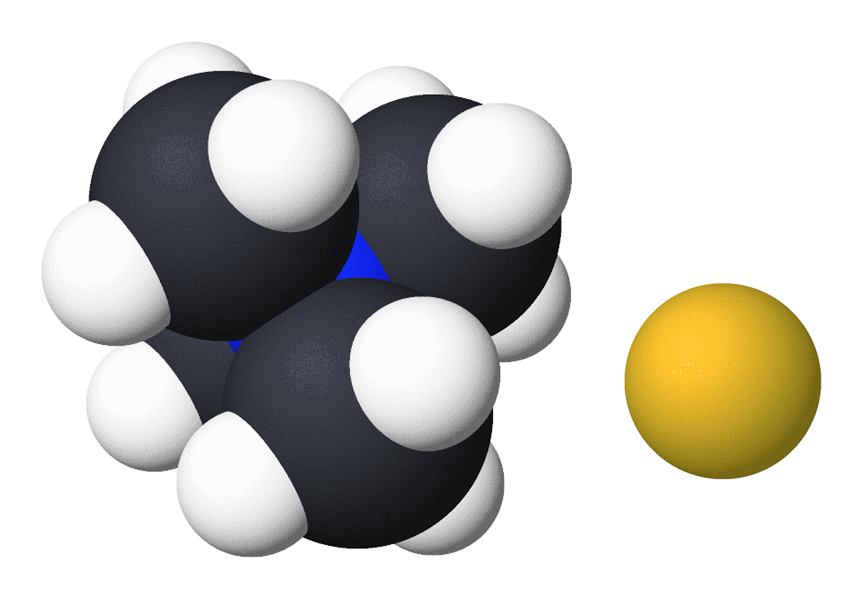

Names
- IUPAC name N,N,N-Trimethylmethanaminium auride

Identifiers
CAS Number	390801-81-7
3D model (JSmol)	Interactive image
- InChI: InChI=1S/C4H12N.Au/c1-5(2,3)4;/h1-4H3;/q+1;-1 Key: FNABMZORGWEURW-UHFFFAOYSA-N
- SMILES: C[N+](C)(C)C.[Au-]

Properties
Chemical formula	C_{4}H_{12}AuN
Molar mass	271.114 g·mol^{−1}
Density	2.87
- Except where otherwise noted, data are given for materials in their standard state (at 25 °C [77 °F], 100 kPa). Infobox references

Tetramethylammonium auride, (CH_{3})_{4}NAu, is an ionic compound containing tetramethylammonium as cation and gold in a –1 oxidation state as anion. It is an example of a compound containing this rare ionic form of gold, and the first auride paired with a cation that is not a metal atom that has been synthesized.

== Production ==
Tetramethylammonium auride can be made from caesium auride dissolved in liquid ammonia reacting with tetramethylammonium chloride or an ion exchange resin.

== Properties ==
Tetramethylammonium auride decomposes over the period of a day at room temperature to form gold. However it is stable at −55°C. Crystals are transparent.

The crystal structure is tetragonal with space group P4/nmm. Unit dell dimensions are a = 7.599, c = 5.433 Å with volume V = 313.7 Å^{3}, Z = 2 formulas per unit cell.
