= Choline bitartrate =

Chemical compound

Choline (2R,3R)-bitartrate
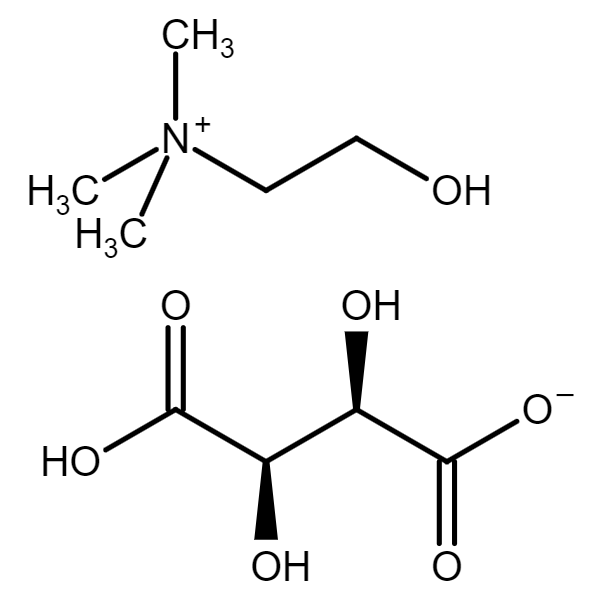

Names
- IUPAC name Choline (2R,3R)-bitartrate
- Systematic IUPAC name (2-Hydroxyethyl)trimethylaminium hydrogen (2R,3R)-tartrate
- Other names: Choline hydrogen L-(+)-tartrate; Choline (2R,3R)-tartrate (1:1); (2-Hydroxyethyl)trimethylammonium hydrogen (2R,3R)-tartrate; (2-Hydroxyethyl)trimethylammonium L-(+)-bitartrate; (2-Hydroxyethyl)trimethylammonium (2R,3R)-bitartrate; (2-Hydroxyethyl)trimethylammonium L-(+)-tartrate salt (1:1)

Identifiers
CAS Number	87-67-2
3D model (JSmol)	Non-isomeric: Interactive image; Isomeric: Interactive image
ChemSpider	8374424
ECHA InfoCard	100.001.604
EC Number	201-763-4
PubChem CID	6900
UNII	6K2W7T9V6Y
CompTox Dashboard (EPA)	DTXSID00889332
- InChI: : InChI=1S/C5H14NO.C4H6O6/c1-6(2,3)4-5-7;5-1(3(7)8)2(6)4(9)10/h7H,4-5H2,1-3H3;1-2,5-6H,(H,7,8)(H,9,10)/q+1;/p-1/t;1-,2-/m.1/s1 Key: QWJSAWXRUVVRLH-LREBCSMRSA-M
- SMILES: Non-isomeric: C[N+](C)(C)CCO.C(C(C(=O)[O-])O)(C(=O)O)O; Isomeric: C[N+](C)(C)CCO.[C@@H]([C@H](C(=O)[O-])O)(C(=O)O)O

Properties
Chemical formula	C_{9}H_{19}NO_{7}
Molar mass	253.251 g·mol^{−1}
Appearance	White crystalline powder
Odor	Odorless or faint trimethylamine-like odor
Melting point	147–153 °C (297–307 °F; 420–426 K)
Solubility	Water (slightly), ethanol (slightly), DMSO (slightly), methanol (slightly, when heated); insoluble in diethyl ether, chloroform and benzene

Structure
Coordination geometry	Tetrahedral molecular geometry at the nitrogen atom

Hazards
- GHS labelling
Pictograms	(GHS07: Exclamation mark)
Signal word	Warning
Hazard statements	H315, H319, H335
Precautionary statements	P261, P264, P264+P265, P271, P280, P302+P352, P304+P340, P305+P351+P338, P319, P321, P332+P317, P337+P317, P362+P364, P403+P233, P405, P501
- Lethal dose or concentration (LD, LC)
LD_{50} (median dose)	200 to 400 grams (as choline, human, estimated)

Related compounds
Other anions	Choline chloride; Choline hydroxide
Other cations	N,N-Dimethylethanolamine bitartrate
Related compounds	Choline; Ethanolamine; Tartaric acid; Trimethylamine
- Except where otherwise noted, data are given for materials in their standard state (at 25 °C [77 °F], 100 kPa). Infobox references

Choline bitartrate is an organic compound with the chemical formula [(CH_{3})_{3}NCH_{2}CH_{2}OH]^{+}HOOC−CH(OH)−CH(OH)−COO^{−}. It is a white crystalline powder with an acid taste. It is hygroscopic when exposed to air. Modern texts refer to the choline salt of the natural form of tartaric acid, that is, the salt called choline dextrobitartrate, choline (2R,3R)-bitartrate or choline L-(+)-bitartrate.

== Chemistry ==
Choline bitartrate is a choline salt of tartaric acid. Choline bitartrate contains quaternary ammonium cations ((2-hydroxyethyl)trimethylammonium [(CH_{3})_{3}NCH_{2}CH_{2}OH]^{+}) and bitartrate anions (HOOC−CH(OH)−CH(OH)−COO^{−}). Quaternary ammonium cation is a cation in which all four hydrogen atoms of ammonium are replaced with organyl groups. In the choline cation, the four substituents of ammonium are three methyl groups (−CH_{3}) and one 2-hydroxyethyl group (−CH_{2}CH_{2}OH). The bitartrate anion is chiral (there are left, right and meso forms of bitartrate, see tartaric acid).

== Production ==
Choline bitartrate can be produced by the chemical reaction of trimethylamine with ethylene oxide and water, followed by reaction with tartaric acid.

N(CH_{3})_{3} + CH_{2}CH_{2}O + H_{2}O → [(CH_{3})_{3}NCH_{2}CH_{2}OH]^{+}OH^{−} [(CH_{3})_{3}NCH_{2}CH_{2}OH]^{+}OH^{−} + C_{4}H_{6}O_{6} → [(CH_{3})_{3}NCH_{2}CH_{2}OH]^{+}C_{4}H_{5}O^{−}_{6} + H_{2}O

== Uses ==
Choline bitartrate is used as a dietary supplement, a food additive, a nutrient and as a lipotropic compound. It is also used as a medication against bipolar disorder and mania (see: choline). Certain conducted double-blind, placebo-controlled studies of the effects of choline bitartrate treatment against Alzheimer-type dementias suggest improvement in some areas of patients' cognitive performance.

== Safety ==
Choline bitartrate is flammable. When burned, choline bitartrate may release toxic gases, like carbon monoxide (CO), carbon dioxide (CO_{2}) and nitrogen oxides (NO, NO_{2}). It may react violently with strong oxidizing agents.

The toxicity of this compound is similar to toxicity of choline itself, which is fairly low, and it is used as a dietary supplement. Oral LD_{50} value for a human is estimated to be 200 to 400 grams (as choline). Nevertheless, choline bitartrate can be harmful, if absorbed through skin. It may cause skin, eye and respiratory system irritation. It may cause gastrointestinal system irritation as well. If swallowed in high doses, may cause dizziness, nausea, vomiting and diarrhea, and a rotten fish-like body smell resulting from the excretion of trimethylamine from the body (trimethylamine is a choline metabolite). There are reports of depression or increased symptoms of it in patients using high doses of choline bitartrate. When choline bitartrate is used appropriately, hazardous effects are unlikely to occur.
