= Choline hydroxide =

Organic chemical compound

Names
- IUPAC name Choline hydroxide
- Systematic IUPAC name 2-Hydroxy-N,N,N-trimethylethanaminium hydroxide
- Other names: Choline base; Ethanaminium, 2-hydroxy-N,N,N-trimethyl-, hydroxide (1:1); Gossypine; (2-Hydroxyethyl)trimethylammonium hydroxide; 2-Hydroxyethyl(trimethyl)azanium hydroxide; Sincaline

Identifiers
CAS Number	123-41-1
3D model (JSmol)	Interactive image
Abbreviations	ChOH
ChEMBL	ChEMBL3187547
ChemSpider	28995
ECHA InfoCard	100.004.206
EC Number	204-625-1
PubChem CID	31255
UNII	7THJ3EG9SY
CompTox Dashboard (EPA)	DTXSID9047467
- InChI: InChI=1S/C5H14NO.H2O/c1-6(2,3)4-5-7;/h7H,4-5H2,1-3H3;1H2/q+1;/p-1 Key: KIZQNNOULOCVDM-UHFFFAOYSA-M
- SMILES: C[N+](C)(C)CCO.[OH-]

Properties
Chemical formula	[(CH_{3})_{3}NCH_{2}CH_{2}OH]^{+}OH^{−}
Molar mass	121.180 g·mol^{−1}
Appearance	Viscous colorless deliquescent liquid or white granular powder
Odor	Unpleasant, like trimethylamine
Density	1.073 g/cm^{3} at 25 °C (46% water solution by weight)
Solubility in water	Very soluble
Solubility	48-50% solution of choline hydroxide in water (by weight) is insoluble in toluene. Choline hydroxide is soluble in ethanol, insoluble in diethyl ether and chloroform.
Refractive index (n_{D})	1.4304 (46% water solution by weight)

Structure
Coordination geometry	Tetrahedral at the nitrogen atom

Hazards
- Occupational safety and health (OHS/OSH)
Main hazards	Corrosive
- GHS labelling
Pictograms	(GHS05: Corrosive) (GHS07: Exclamation mark) (GHS08: Health hazard)
Signal word	Danger
Hazard statements	H314, H335, H372
Precautionary statements	P260, P264, P270, P271, P280, P301+P330+P331, P302, P304+P340, P305, P316, P317, P319, P321, P338, P361, P363, P403+P233, P405, P501
NFPA 704 (fire diamond)	3 0 0
Flash point	92 °F (33 °C)
Autoignition temperature	380 °C (716 °F)
- Lethal dose or concentration (LD, LC)
LD_{50} (median dose)	21.4 mg/kg (mouse, intravenous)

Related compounds
Other anions	Choline chloride
Other cations	Tetraethylammonium hydroxide
Related compounds	Choline
- Except where otherwise noted, data are given for materials in their standard state (at 25 °C [77 °F], 100 kPa). Infobox references

Choline hydroxide is an organic compound with the chemical formula [(CH_{3})_{3}NCH_{2}CH_{2}OH]^{+}OH^{−}. It is also known as choline base. It is used as solutions in water or alcohols, which are colorless and very alkaline.

== Properties ==
It is hygroscopic and thus often encountered as a colorless viscous hydrated syrup that smells of trimethylamine (TMA). Aqueous solutions of choline are stable, but the compound slowly breaks down to ethylene glycol, polyethylene glycols, and TMA.

== Chemistry ==
Choline hydroxide is a quaternary ammonium salt, consisting of choline cations ([(CH_{3})_{3}NCH_{2}CH_{2}OH]^{+}) and hydroxide anions (OH^{−}). It is bifunctional compound, meaning, it contains both quaternary ammonium functional group and a hydroxyl functional group. Choline hydroxide forms an ionic liquid.

== Occurrence ==
The cation of this salt, choline, occurs in nature in living beings.

== Uses ==
Choline hydroxide is used in industry as a pH regulating agent and as an eco-friendly, biodegradable, recyclable and efficient catalyst with high yields for synthesis of certain organic compounds (2-amino-3-nitro-4H-chromene derivatives) in an aqueous solution at room temperatures.

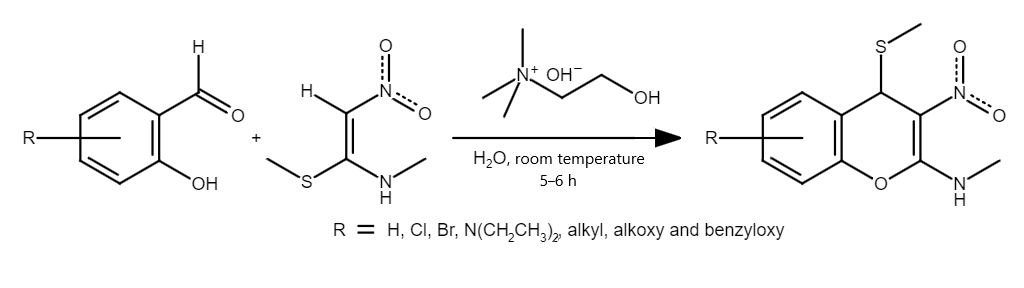
A chemical reaction of various salicylaldehydes (2-hydroxybenzaldehydes) with (E)-N-methyl-1-(methylthio)-2-nitroethenamine, in the presence of a basic ionic liquid catalyst such as choline hydroxide, at room temperature in an aqueous medium, produces 2-amino-3-nitro-4H-chromene derivatives (yields up to 83-96%).

== Safety ==
Choline hydroxide irritates skin, eyes and respiratory system. It can cause serious injuries to the eyes. Causes serious skin and eye burns. Inhalation of this chemical may cause dyspnea and corrosive injuries to upper respiratory system and lungs, which can lead to pneumonia. May react violently with strong oxidizing agents.
