= N,N-Dimethylethanolamine bitartrate =

N,N-Dimethylethanolamine (2R,3R)-bitartrate
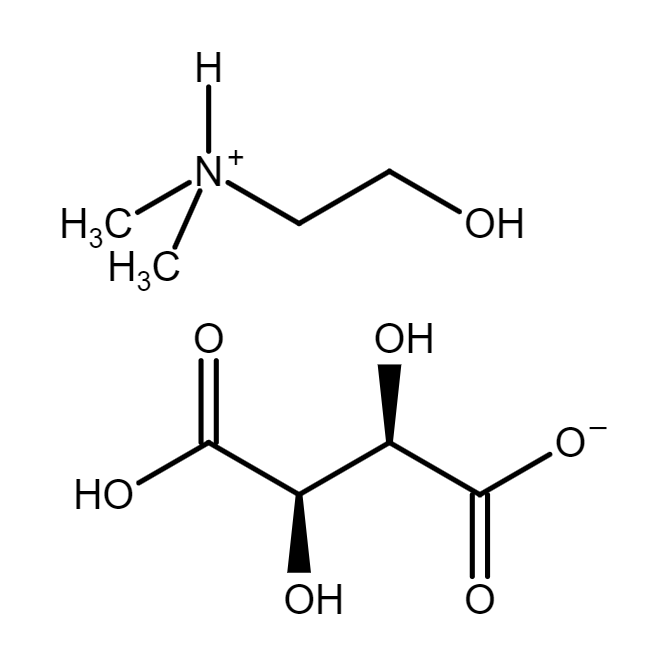

Names
- IUPAC name N,N-Dimethylethanolamine (2R,3R)-bitartrate
- Systematic IUPAC name Dimethyl(2-hydroxyethyl)ammonium hydrogen 1,4-butanedioate
- Other names: 2-(Dimethylamino)ethanol hydrogen L-(+)-Tartrate; 2-(Dimethylamino)ethanol L-(+)-bitartrate; 2-(Dimethylamino)ethanol (2R,3R)-2,3-dihydroxysuccinate; Atrol; Deanol bitartrate; DMAE bitartrate; Ethanol, 2-(dimethylamino)-, (2R,3R)-2,3-dihydroxybutanedioate (1:1); Liparon; N,N-dimethylethanolamine L-(+)-bitartrate; N,N-Dimethylethanolamine (2R,3R)-bitartrate

Identifiers
| CAS Number | 29870-28-8 |
| 3D model (JSmol) | Isomeric: Interactive image; Non-isomeric: Interactive image |
| ChemSpider | 17340333 |
| ECHA InfoCard | 100.025.281 |
| EC Number | 227-809-3 |
| PubChem CID | 16212495 |
| UNII | D240J05W14 |
| CompTox Dashboard (EPA) | DTXSID40952332 |
- InChI: InChI=1S/C4H11NO.C4H6O6/c1-5(2)3-4-6;5-1(3(7)8)2(6)4(9)10/h6H,3-4H2,1-2H3;1-2,5-6H,(H,7,8)(H,9,10)/t;1-,2-/m.1/s1 Key: UIEGYKVRCKDVKQ-LREBCSMRSA-N
- SMILES: Isomeric: CN(C)CCO.C(C(C(=O)O)O)(C(=O)O)O; Non-isomeric: CN(C)CCO.[C@@H]([C@H](C(=O)O)O)(C(=O)O)O

Properties
| Chemical formula | C_{8}H_{17}NO_{7} |
| Molar mass | 239.224 g·mol^{−1} |
| Appearance | White powder or white crystals |
| Melting point | 111–113 °C (232–235 °F; 384–386 K) |
| Solubility in water | Slightly |
| Solubility | Methanol (slightly, heated) |

Structure
| Coordination geometry | Tetrahedral at the nitrogen atom |

Hazards
- Occupational safety and health (OHS/OSH)
| Main hazards | Serious eye damage |
- GHS labelling
| Pictograms | (GHS07: Exclamation mark) |
| Signal word | Warning |
| Hazard statements | H315, H319, H335 |
| Precautionary statements | P261, P264, P271, P280, P302+P352, P304+P340, P305+P351+P338, P317, P319, P321, P332, P337, P362+P364, P403+P233, P405, P501 |
- Lethal dose or concentration (LD, LC)
| LD_{50} (median dose) | 2600 mg/kg (rat, oral); 3100 mg/kg (mouse, oral); 3000 mg/kg (mouse, intraperitoneal) |

Related compounds
| Other cations | Choline bitartrate; Sodium bitartrate; Potassium bitartrate |
| Related compounds | Bitartrate; Tartrate; Tartaric acid |
- Except where otherwise noted, data are given for materials in their standard state (at 25 °C [77 °F], 100 kPa). Infobox references

N,N-Dimethylethanolamine bitartrate or deanol bitartrate is an organic compound with the chemical formula [HN(CH_{3})_{2}CH_{2}CH_{2}OH]^{+}HOOC−CH(OH)−CH(OH)−COO^{−}. It is a white powder. Modern texts refer to the N,N-dimethylethanolamine salt of the natural form of tartaric acid, that is, the salt called N,N-dimethylethanolamine dextrobitartrate, N,N-dimethylethanolamine (2R,3R)-bitartrate or N,N-dimethylethanolamine L-(+)-bitartrate.

== Chemistry ==
N,N-Dimethylethanolamine bitartrate is a N,N-dimethylethanolamine salt of tartaric acid. N,N-Dimethylethanolamine bitartrate contains tertiary ammonium cations (dimethyl(2-hydroxyethyl)ammonium [HN(CH_{3})_{2}CH_{2}CH_{2}OH]^{+}) and bitartrate anions (HOOC−CH(OH)−CH(OH)−COO^{−}). Tertiary ammonium cation is a cation in which three hydrogen atoms of ammonium are replaced with organyl groups. In this compound, the three substituents of ammonium are two methyl groups (−CH_{3}) and one 2-hydroxyethyl group (−CH_{2}CH_{2}OH). The bitartrate anion is chiral (there are left, right and meso forms of bitartrate, see tartaric acid).

== Uses ==
N,N-Dimethylethanolamine bitartrate is used in biological studies to evaluate motor activity in response to the injection of N,N-dimethylethanolamine.
