= Ethyl lactate =

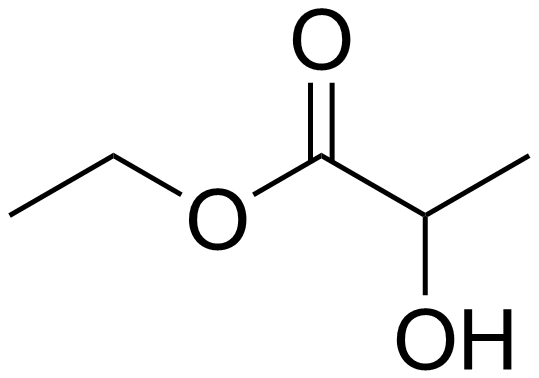

Names
- IUPAC name Ethyl 2-hydroxypropanoate
- Other names Ethyl lactate; Lactic acid ethyl ester; 2-Hydroxypropanoic acid ethyl ester; Actylol; Acytol

Identifiers
CAS Number	687-47-8 (L-isomer); 97-64-3 (racemate); 7699-00-5 (D-isomer)
3D model (JSmol)	Interactive image
ChemSpider	13837423
ECHA InfoCard	100.002.363
EC Number	202-598-0
PubChem CID	7344
RTECS number	OD5075000
UNII	F3P750VW8I
UN number	1192
CompTox Dashboard (EPA)	DTXSID6029127
- InChI: InChI=1S/C5H10O3/c1-3-8-5(7)4(2)6/h4,6H,3H2,1-2H3 Key: LZCLXQDLBQLTDK-UHFFFAOYSA-N; InChI=1/C5H10O3/c1-3-8-5(7)4(2)6/h4,6H,3H2,1-2H3 Key: LZCLXQDLBQLTDK-UHFFFAOYAV
- SMILES: CCOC(=O)C(C)O

Properties
Chemical formula	C_{5}H_{10}O_{3}
Molar mass	118.132 g·mol^{−1}
Appearance	Colorless liquid
Density	1.03 g/cm^{3}
Melting point	−26 °C (−15 °F; 247 K)
Boiling point	151 to 155 °C (304 to 311 °F; 424 to 428 K)
Solubility in water	Miscible
Solubility in ethanol and most alcohols	Miscible
Chiral rotation ([α]_{D})	−11.3°
Magnetic susceptibility (χ)	−72.6·10^{−6} cm^{3}/mol

Structure
Dipole moment	3.46 D

Hazards
- GHS labelling
Pictograms	(GHS02: Flammable) (GHS05: Corrosive) (GHS07: Exclamation mark)
Signal word	Danger
Hazard statements	H226, H318, H335
Precautionary statements	P210, P233, P240, P241, P242, P243, P261, P271, P280, P303+P361+P353, P304+P340, P305+P351+P338, P310, P312, P370+P378, P403+P233, P403+P235, P405, P501
NFPA 704 (fire diamond)	3 2 0
Flash point	58 °C (136 °F; 331 K)

Related compounds
Related compounds	Lactic acid, Methyl lactate
- Except where otherwise noted, data are given for materials in their standard state (at 25 °C [77 °F], 100 kPa). verify (what is ?) Infobox references

Ethyl lactate, also known as lactic acid ethyl ester, is the organic compound with the formula CH_{3}CH(OH)CO_{2}CH_{2}CH_{3}. It is the ethyl ester of lactic acid. A colorless liquid, it is a chiral ester. Being naturally derived, it is readily available as a single enantiomer. It is commonly used as a solvent. This compound is considered biodegradable and can be used as a water-rinsible degreaser. Ethyl lactate is found naturally in small quantities in a wide variety of foods including wine, chicken, and various fruits. The odor of ethyl lactate when dilute is mild, buttery, creamy, with hints of fruit and coconut.

== Production ==
Ethyl lactate is produced from biological sources, and can be either the levo (S) form or dextro (R) form, depending on the organism that is the source of the lactic acid. Most biologically sourced ethyl lactate is ethyl (−)-L-lactate (ethyl (S)-lactate). Ethyl lactate is also produced industrially from petrochemical stocks, and this ethyl lactate consists of the racemic mixture of levo and dextro forms.

== Applications ==
Because both enantiomers are found in nature, and because ethyl lactate is easily biodegradable, it is considered to be a "green solvent." Ethyl lactate and its aqueous solutions are used as sustainable media for organic synthesis. Due to its relatively low toxicity, ethyl lactate is used commonly in pharmaceutical preparations, food additives, and fragrances. Ethyl lactate is also used as solvent for nitrocellulose, cellulose acetate, and cellulose ethers.
