= Tetramethylammonium chloride =

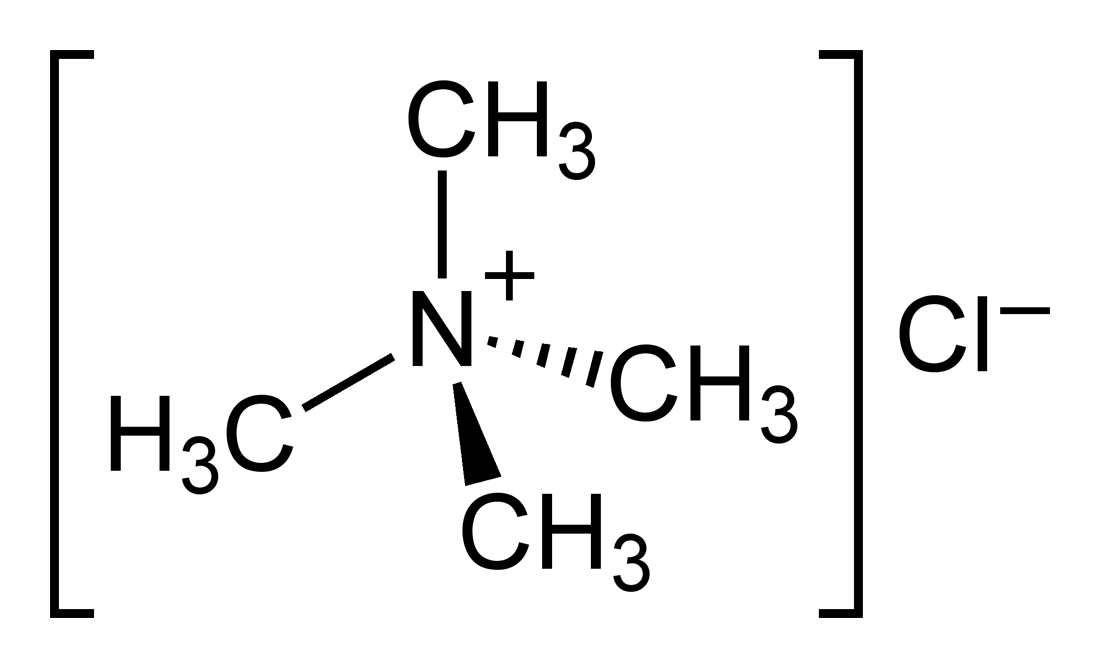

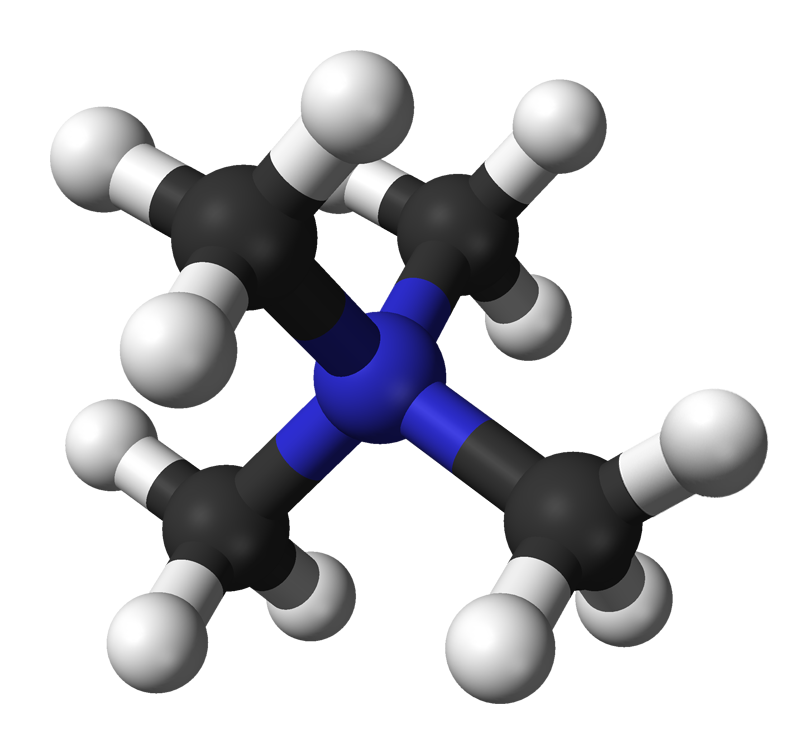
- Tetramethylammonium ion. Blue: nitrogen, black: carbon, white: hydrogen

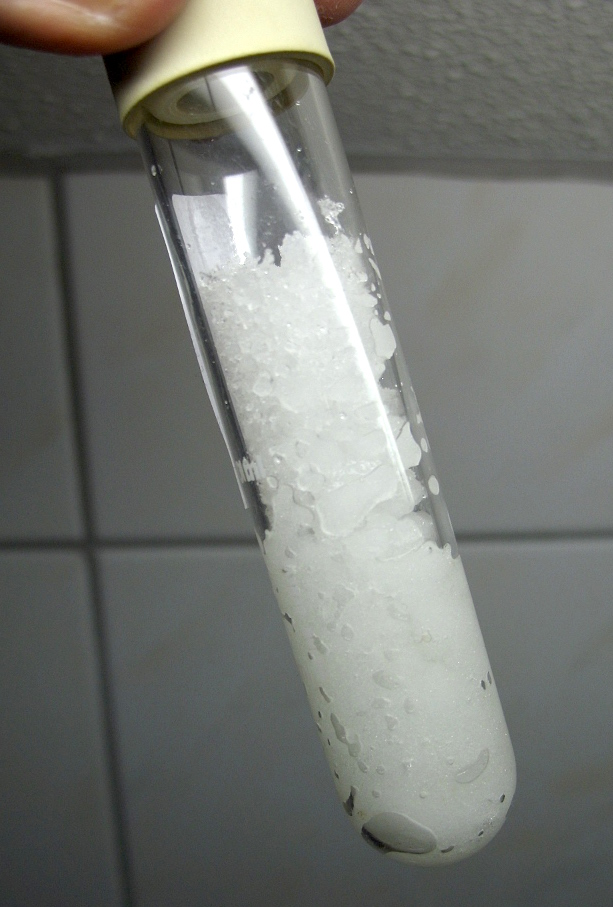

Names
- Preferred IUPAC name N,N,N-Trimethylmethanaminium chloride
- Other names Tetramethylammonium chloride Tetramethylazanium chloride

Identifiers
CAS Number	75-57-0
3D model (JSmol)	Interactive image
ChemSpider	6139
ECHA InfoCard	100.000.801
PubChem CID	6379
UNII	DCQ9S88703
CompTox Dashboard (EPA)	DTXSID501030186 DTXSID6021749, DTXSID501030186
- InChI: InChI=1S/C4H12N.ClH/c1-5(2,3)4;/h1-4H3;1H/q+1;/p-1 Key: OKIZCWYLBDKLSU-UHFFFAOYSA-M; InChI=1/C4H12N.ClH/c1-5(2,3)4;/h1-4H3;1H/q+1;/p-1 Key: OKIZCWYLBDKLSU-REWHXWOFAY
- SMILES: C[N+](C)(C)C.[Cl-]

Properties
Chemical formula	C_{4}H_{12}NCl
Molar mass	109.60 g/mol
Appearance	White crystals
Density	1.17 g/cm^{3}
Melting point	425 °C (797 °F; 698 K) (decomposes)
Solubility	Soluble in water and methanol. Slightly soluble in ethanol. Insoluble in ether, benzene, chloroform.

Hazards
Safety data sheet (SDS)	External MSDS

Related compounds
Other anions	Tetramethylammonium hydroxide; Tetramethylammonium fluoride; Tetramethylammonium nitrate; Tetramethylammonium perchlorate; Tetramethylammonium ozonide; Tetramethylammonium auride
Other cations	Tetraethylammonium chloride; Tetrapropylammonium chloride; Tetrabutylammonium chloride
- Except where otherwise noted, data are given for materials in their standard state (at 25 °C [77 °F], 100 kPa). verify (what is ?) Infobox references

Tetramethylammonium chloride is one of the simplest quaternary ammonium salts, with four methyl groups tetrahedrally attached to the central N. The chemical formula (CH_{3})_{4}N^{+}Cl^{−} is often abbreviated further as Me_{4}N^{+}Cl^{−}. It is a hygroscopic colourless solid that is soluble in water and polar organic solvents. Tetramethylammonium chloride is a major industrial chemical, being used widely as a chemical reagent and also as a low-residue bactericide in such processes as hydrofracking. In the laboratory, it has fewer synthetic chemical applications than quaternary ammonium salts containing longer N-alkyl substituents, which are used extensively as phase-transfer catalysts.

== Preparation and laboratory uses ==
Tetramethylammonium chloride is efficiently produced by the reaction of trimethylamine and methyl chloride.

N(CH_{3})_{3} + CH_{3}Cl → N(CH_{3})_{4}^{+}Cl^{−}

It is produced by the alkylation of ammonium chloride with dimethyl carbonate in the presence of an ionic liquid catalyst.

Except under extraordinary conditions, it is typically employed as a source of the inert counter cation Me_{4}N^{+}. Similarly, it serves as a lipophilic precipitating agent.

In low concentrations, it is used in polymerase chain reactions to increase yields and specificity. It has been shown to enhance yields 5–10 fold at 60mM by stabilizing the AT base pairs.

== Toxicity ==
LD_{50} = 25 mg/kg (mouse, i.p.); 40 mg/kg (mouse, s.c.); 50 mg/kg (rat, p.o.). Very toxic to aquatic organisms.

Diverse data on human exposure, environmental toxicology and environmentally-related chemistry is available through the NIH Toxnet database.

== See also ==
- Quaternary ammonium cation
- Tetraethylammonium chloride
- Tetramethylammonium hydroxide
- Tetramethylammonium
