= Caesium auride =

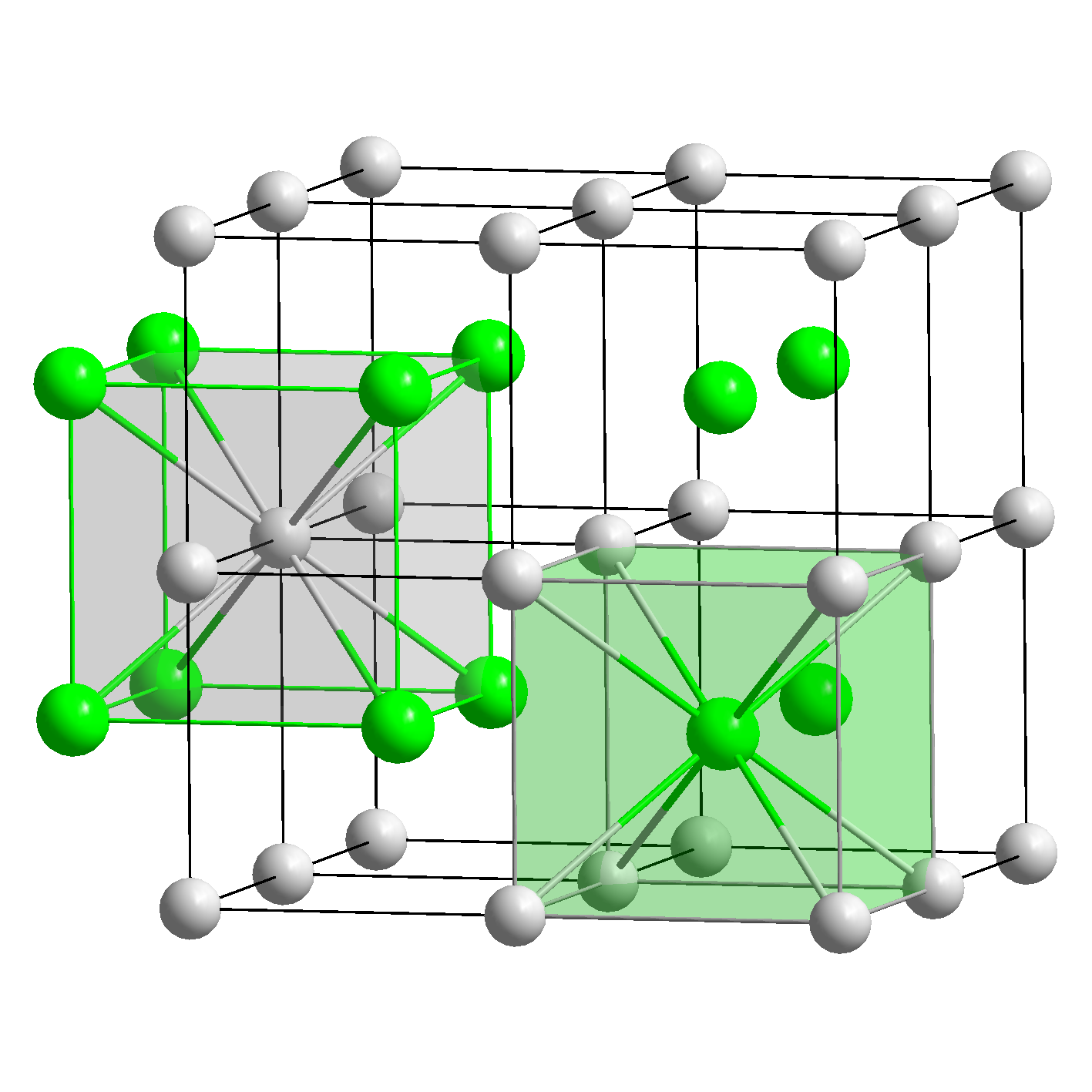

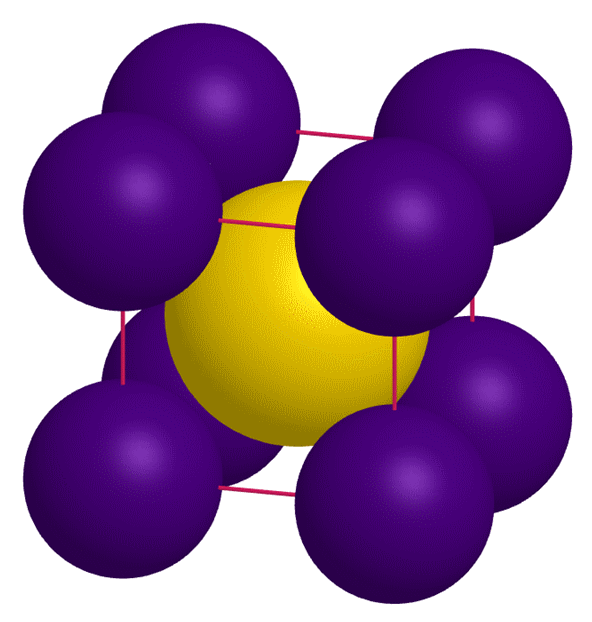

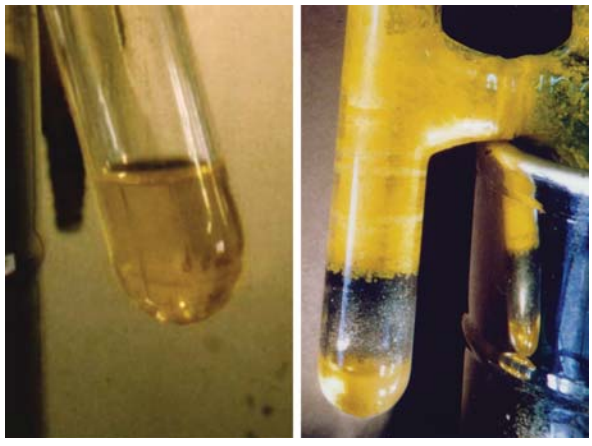
- Solution of CsAu(left), pure CsAu(right)

Names
- IUPAC name Caesium auride

Identifiers
CAS Number	12256-37-0
3D model (JSmol)	covalent form: Interactive image; ionic form: Interactive image
ChemSpider	65322210
PubChem CID	71308168
- InChI: InChI=1S/Au.Cs Key: COOMJVRPVOQALF-UHFFFAOYSA-N
- SMILES: covalent form: [Cs][Au]; ionic form: [Cs+].[Au-]

Properties
Chemical formula	AuCs
Molar mass	329.872022 g·mol^{−1}
Appearance	Yellow crystals
Melting point	580 °C (1,076 °F; 853 K)
Solubility in water	reacts violently

Structure
Crystal structure	CsCl
Lattice constant	a = 4.24 Å

Thermochemistry
Std enthalpy of formation (Δ_{f}H^{⦵}_{298})	−123 kJ/mol
- Except where otherwise noted, data are given for materials in their standard state (at 25 °C [77 °F], 100 kPa). verify (what is ?) Infobox references

Caesium auride is the inorganic compound with the formula CsAu. It is the Cs^{+} salt of the unusual Au^{−} anion.

When molten, it is one of the very few liquids other than typical salts (composed of a metal and a nonmetal) in which mobile ions drive conductivity.

Gold has the highest electronegativity of all metals due to relativistic effects. In this compound, it is described to be acting as a pseudo-halogen.

== Preparation and reactions ==
CsAu is obtained by heating a stoichiometric mixture of caesium and gold. Non-stoichiometric mixtures result in an alloy rather than an ionic compound. The two metallic-yellow liquids react to give a transparent yellow product.

Despite being a compound of two metals, CsAu lacks metallic properties since it is a salt with localized charges; it instead behaves as a semiconductor with band gap 2.6 eV. In this way it splits the difference between typical ionic solids, which are insulators, and typical metallic solids, which are conductors. This semiconductivity is a relativistic effect.

The compound hydrolyzes readily on contact with water, yielding caesium hydroxide, metallic gold, and hydrogen.

2 CsAu + 2 H_{2}O → 2 CsOH + 2 Au + H_{2}

The solution in liquid ammonia is brown, and the ammonia adduct CsAu·NH_{3} is blue; the latter has ammonia molecules intercalated between layers of the CsAu crystal parallel to the (110) plane. Solutions undergo metathesis with tetramethylammonium loaded ion exchange resin to give tetramethylammonium auride.

The solid is transparent and red.

== Crystal structure ==
Caesium auride has a cubic lattice structure of the CsCl type. Each caesium atom is octahedrally coordinated with 8 gold atoms, and vice versa. The lattice constant at ambient conditions is approximately 4.24 Å, close to that of CsCl but slightly larger due to the larger Au^{−} ionic radius compared to Cl^{−}. The bonding is predominantly ionic, as found by X-ray photoelectron spectroscopy, because gold has a much higher electronegativity than caesium.
