= 4-Chlorobenzotrifluoride =

Names
- Preferred IUPAC name 1-Chloro-4-(trifluoromethyl)benzene
- Other names: Benzene, 1-chloro-4-(trifluoromethyl)-; Parachlorobenzotrifluoride; 4-Chlorobenzotrifluoride; Oxsol

Identifiers
CAS Number	98-56-6
3D model (JSmol)	Interactive image
Abbreviations	PCBTF
Beilstein Reference	510203
ChemSpider	7116
ECHA InfoCard	100.002.438
EC Number	202-681-1202-681-1
MeSH	C037723
PubChem CID	7394
UNII	694YO34JHC
UN number	2234
CompTox Dashboard (EPA)	DTXSID7024821
- InChI: InChI=1S/C7H4ClF3/c8-6-3-1-5(2-4-6)7(9,10)11/h1-4H Key: QULYNCCPRWKEMF-UHFFFAOYSA-N; InChI=1/C7H4ClF3/c8-6-3-1-5(2-4-6)7(9,10)11/h1-4H Key: QULYNCCPRWKEMF-UHFFFAOYAI
- SMILES: C1=CC(=CC=C1C(F)(F)F)Cl

Properties
Chemical formula	C_{7}H_{4}ClF_{3}
Molar mass	180.55 g·mol^{−1}
Appearance	Colorless liquid
Density	1.33-1.35 @ 22 °C (72 °F)
Melting point	−32.8 °C (−27.0 °F; 240.3 K)
Boiling point	138.6 °C (281.5 °F; 411.8 K)
Solubility in water	29 mg/L
log P	3.7 @ 25 °C (77 °F)
Vapor pressure	5.3 millimetres of mercury (0.0070 atm) @ 20 °C (68 °F)
Henry's law constant (k_{H})	0.0347

Hazards
- GHS labelling
Pictograms	(GHS02: Flammable) (GHS07: Exclamation mark) (GHS09: Environmental hazard)
Signal word	Warning
Hazard statements	H226, H315, H319, H335, H411
Precautionary statements	P210, P233, P240, P241, P242, P243, P261, P264, P271, P273, P280, P302+P352, P303+P361+P353, P304+P340, P305+P351+P338, P312, P321, P332+P313, P337+P313, P362, P370+P378, P391, P403+P233, P403+P235, P405, P501
NFPA 704 (fire diamond)	1 2 1
Flash point	42.8 °C (109.0 °F; 315.9 K)
Autoignition temperature	600 °C (1,112 °F; 873 K)
Explosive limits	0.9%-10.5% (V)
- Lethal dose or concentration (LD, LC)
LD_{50} (median dose)	Oral, rat: 13000 mg/kg; Dermal, rabbit: > 2000 mg/kg
LC_{50} (median concentration)	Inhalation, rat: 33 mg/L
Safety data sheet (SDS)	https://smc-global.com/wp-content/uploads/2020/07/SMC-msds_m900.pdf
- Except where otherwise noted, data are given for materials in their standard state (at 25 °C [77 °F], 100 kPa). verify (what is ?) Infobox references

4-Chlorobenzotrifluoride is a organofluorine compound with the molecular formula C_{7}H_{4}ClF_{3}. Frequently abbreviated PCBTF (for parachlorobenzotrifluoride), it is a colorless liquid with a distinct aromatic odor. PCBTF has been commercially-produced since the 1960s. It is a precursor to commercial dyes.

== Preparation ==
4-Chlorobenzotrifluoride is produced commercially by trifluoromethylation of chlorobenzene.

Historically, Occidental Chemical Corporation was a leading producer and sold it as part of its Oxsol product line, specifically under the brand name of Oxsol 100. Occidental Chemical Corporation sold the OXSOL line to Makhteshim Agan Industries, Ltd., in 2002.

== Uses ==
Nitration of PCBTF gives 4-chloro-3,5-dinitrobenzotrifluoride, a precursor to the herbicides trifluralin, fluorodifen, and acifluorfen. It is also a precursor to the insecticide fluvalinate.

PCBTF has also been used as a solvent.

== Health and Environmental effects ==
Health effects:

- Points of entry: eyes, ingestion, inhalation, skin.
- Target organs: central nervous system, kidneys, liver.
- Irritancy: eyes, respiratory tract, skin

In the troposphere, PCBTF has an estimated half-life of 67 days. It is transformed by reaction with photochemically-produced hydroxyl radicals to give mainly 2-chloro-5-trifluoromethylphenol.

== Regulation ==
PCBTF currently has VOC Exempt status from the U.S. Environmental Protection Agency. However, California's Office of Environmental Health Hazard Assessment (OEHHA) has adopted inhalation risk factors for PCBTF as of June 2019, which could have implications for its ongoing VOC Exempt status.
