= Deep eutectic solvent =

Solutions of Lewis or Brønsted acids and bases

Deep eutectic solvents (DESs) are solutions of Lewis or Brønsted acids and bases which form a eutectic mixture. Deep eutectic solvents are highly tunable through varying the structure or relative ratio of parent components and thus have a wide variety of potential applications including catalytic, separation, and electrochemical processes. The parent components of deep eutectic solvents engage in a complex hydrogen bonding network, which results in significant freezing point depression as compared to the parent compounds. The extent of freezing point depression observed in DESs is well illustrated by a mixture of choline chloride (ChCl) and urea in a 1:2 mole ratio. Choline chloride and urea are both solids at room temperature with melting points of 302 °C (decomposition point) and 133 °C respectively, yet the combination of the two in a 1:2 molar ratio forms a liquid with a freezing point of 12 °C. DESs share similar properties to ionic liquids such as tunability and lack of flammability, yet are distinct in that ionic liquids are neat salts composed exclusively of discrete ions. In contrast to ordinary solvents, such as volatile organic compounds, DESs are non-flammable, and possess low vapour pressures and toxicity and are generally recognized as safe.

Widespread practical use of DESs in industrial process or devices has thus far been hindered by relatively high viscosities and low ionic conductivities. Additionally, lack of understanding of the relationship between parent compound structure and solvent function has prevented development of general design rules. Work to understand structure-function relation is on-going.

== Chemical classes ==
=== Four-class classification ===
DESs can be classified on the basis of their composition:

	Hydrogen bond acceptor	Hydrogen bond donor
Type 1 (I)	Organic cation salt	Metal salt
Type 2 (II)	Organic cation salt	Metal salt hydrate
Type 3 (III)	Organic cation salt	Organic HBD
Type 4 (IV)	Metal salt	Organic HBD

This classification is an extension of the traditional scheme, in which the "organic cation" was limited to a quaternary ammonium and the "metal salt" was limited to chlorides.

1. Type 1 eutectics include a wide range of chlorometallate ionic solvents which were widely studied in the 1980s, such as imidazolium chloroaluminates which are based on mixtures of AlCl_{3} + 1-Ethyl-3-methylimidazolium chloride. When chlorides are used, the metal can be Zn, Sn, Fe, Al, or Ga.
2. Type 2 eutectics are similar to type 1, except that the hydrated form of the metal halide is used. When chlorides are used, the metal can be Cr, Co, Cu, Ni, or Fe.
3. Type 3 eutectics consist of hydrogen bond acceptors such as quaternary ammonium salts (e.g. choline chloride) and hydrogen bond donors (e.g urea, ethylene glycol). Many of them are metal-free deep eutectic solvents. Type 3 eutectics have been successfully used in metal processing applications such as electrodeposition, electropolishing, and metal extraction.
4. Type 4 eutectics use a metal salt as the HBA and an organic HBD. It was originally thought to be a hybrid between type 1 and type 3, but then it was found that it had some properties of its own; for example, urea can form a type 4 DES with the chloride of Zn, Sn, and Fe(III), but not with Al. Type 4 eutectics are of interest for electrodeposition as they produce cationic metal complexes, ensuring that the double layer close to the electrode surface has a high metal ion concentration.

=== Natural deep eutectic solvents ===
Natural deep eutectic solvents (NADES) are deep eutectic solvents which are composed of two or more compounds that are generally primary metabolites, i.e. organic acids, sugars, alcohols, amines and amino acids. The classical example is the combination of ChCl and carboxylic acids. Almost all known NADES are metal-free and type 3. Being made from cheap, abundant, and nontoxic biomolecules, there is considerable interest in their application in the lab and in industry.

NADES are also biologically interesting as they can plausibly form in living cells. Alongside natural ionic liquids, they may represent a type of liquid phase separate from water and lipids. They serve as a potential explanation to so-called "glass formation" of sugars. Some eutectic solvents are formed by complete drying of biological fluids. For example, completely drying maple syrup leaves a liquid consisting of mostly Suc [sucrose] and malic acid; lab work shows that the ideal DES mixture for these two substances is at 1:1 molar ratio. Cleome hassleriana nectar (mostly Glu [glucose], Fru [fructose], Suc) remains a fluid when completely dried; lab work shows that the most stable DES made from these three substances is at a 1:1:1 molar ratio. Also of biological interest is the formation of water-containing DESs using Glu, Fru, or Suc at 1:1:1 molar ratio with ChCl and water. Here the water is strongly retained in the liquid and cannot be evaporated.

== Chemical research ==
Compared to modern ionic liquids based on discrete anions, such as bistriflimide, which share many characteristics but are ionic compounds and not ionic mixtures, DES are cheaper to make and sometimes biodegradable. Therefore, DES can be used as safe, efficient, simple, and low–cost solvents.

To date, there are numerous applications that have been studied for DES. By varying the components of the DES and their molar ratios, new DES can be produced. For this reason, many new applications are presented in the literature every year. Some of the earliest applications of DES were the electrofinishing of metals using DES as electrolytes. Organic compounds such as benzoic acid (solubility 0.82 mol/L) have great solubility in DES, and this even includes cellulose. For this reason, DES were applied as extraction solvents for such material from their complex matrices. DES as extraction solvents in the separation of aromatic hydrocarbons from naphtha was also studied and promising results were published in 2012 and 2013.

They were also studied for their applicability in the production and purification of biodiesel, and their ability to extract metals for analysis. Incorporating microwave heating with deep eutectic solvent can efficiently increase the solubility power of DES and reduce the time required for complete dissolution of biological samples at atmospheric pressure. It is noteworthy that proton-conducting DES (e.g. the mixture of imidazolium methanesulfonate and 1H-1,2,4-triazole in a 1:3 mole ratio or the mixture of 1,2,4-triazolium methanesulfonate and 1H-1,2,4-triazole in a 1:3 mole ratio, wherein the Brønsted base may act as the hydrogen bond donor) have also found applications as proton conductors for fuel cells.

=== Emulsions ===
Owing to their unique composition, DES are promising solvating environments, affecting the structure and self-assembly of solutes. For example, the self-assembly of sodium dodecyl sulfate (SDS) in DES has recently been studied, implying DES can form microemulsions different from those in water. In another case, the solvation of the polymer polyvinylpyrrolidone (PVP) in DES is distinct from water, whereby the DES appear to be a better solvent for the polymer. It has been also shown that depending on state of matter of the solute homogeneous or heterogeneous mixtures are formed.

=== Ore ===
DES have also been studied for their potential use as more environmentally sustainable solvents for extracting gold and other precious metals from ore. Some solvent extraction work has been done using DES solvents; Mark Foreman at Chalmers has in recent years published several papers on this topic. He wrote about the use of the solvents for battery recycling from an applied point of view and he also published what may be the first ever serious study of solvent extraction of metals from DES. Foreman has also published two pure research papers on the activity issues in DES, in the first he pointed out that activity coefficients in DES do appear to deviate wildly away from their values in sodium chloride solution while in his later paper he provides a mathematical model for the activity coefficients in DES using the SIT equation. Lastly, DES involvement in thermoelectrical field was researched through the incorporation of DES in thermoelectric polymer for the synthesis of improved thermoelectric polymer films.

== In biology ==
Both individual DES components and the resultant mixtures are highly biodegradable.

Individual DES components are generally non-toxic. However, their combination into a DES produces a higher toxicity for bacteria, fungi, fish, Artemia (brime shrimp), Hydra, and cultured mammal cells compared to the individual components; a case of synergy. The toxicity of DES to naked, individual cells is a natural consequence of its physiochemical properties: what allows it to work as a good solvent also enables it to disrupt cell membranes.

The ability of DES to increase the permeability of lipid bilayer membranes leads to applications in biocatalysis. When living microbes are grown for producing chemicals, a common bottleneck is the permeability of their cell membranes limiting the flux of substrates and products. Adding a small amount of DES to the growth medium solves this problem: just a 1% (v/v) addition of a (NA)DES based on choline acetate increases the isoeugenol-to-vanillin bioconversion yield of Lysinibacillus fusiformis 142%. DES also acts in membrane-independent ways, directly acting on the enzymes to modify its behavior (e.g. increase stereoselectivity). This can be applied to live cells and their dead components alike. Some enzymes even work in water-free conditions where DES is the only solvent.
