= Tetramethylammonium hydroxide =

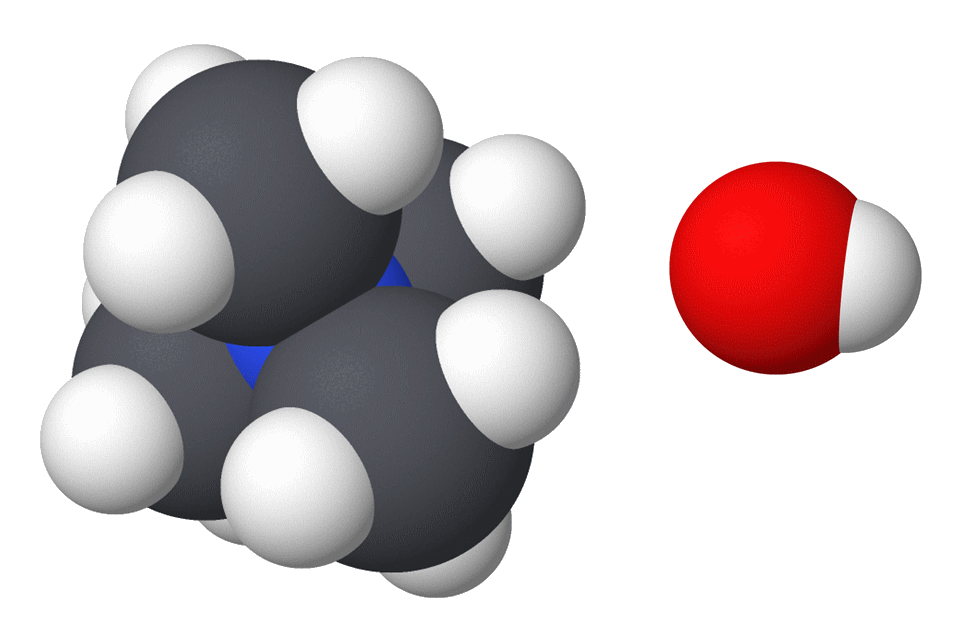

Names
- IUPAC name N,N,N-Trimethylmethanaminium hydroxide
- Other names tetramethylammonium hydroxide

Identifiers
CAS Number	75-59-2; 10424-66-5 (trihydrate); 10424-65-4 (pentahydrate)
3D model (JSmol)	Interactive image
ChemSpider	54928
ECHA InfoCard	100.000.803
PubChem CID	60966
UNII	5GKP7317Q2; B2HKT2LCKQ (pentahydrate)
CompTox Dashboard (EPA)	DTXSID3029108
- InChI: InChI=1S/C4H12N.H2O/c1-5(2,3)4;/h1-4H3;1H2/q+1;/p-1 Key: WGTYBPLFGIVFAS-UHFFFAOYSA-M; InChI=1/C4H12N.H2O/c1-5(2,3)4;/h1-4H3;1H2/q+1;/p-1 Key: WGTYBPLFGIVFAS-REWHXWOFAQ
- SMILES: C[N+](C)(C)C.[OH-]

Properties
Chemical formula	C_{4}H_{13}NO
Molar mass	91.154 g·mol^{−1}
Density	~ 1.015 g/cm^{3} (20-25% aqueous solution)
Melting point	67 °C (153 °F; 340 K) (pentahydrate)
Boiling point	decomposes
Solubility in water	high

Hazards
- GHS labelling
Pictograms	
Signal word	Danger
Hazard statements	H300+H310, H314, H370, H372, H411
Precautionary statements	P260, P273, P280, P303+P361+P353, P304+P340+P310, P305+P351+P338
NFPA 704 (fire diamond)	3 0 0
Safety data sheet (SDS)	Sigma-Aldrich MSDS for TMAH·5H_{2}O

Related compounds
Other anions	tetramethylammonium chloride
Other cations	tetraethylammonium hydroxide
- Except where otherwise noted, data are given for materials in their standard state (at 25 °C [77 °F], 100 kPa). verify (what is ?) Infobox references

Tetramethylammonium hydroxide (TMAH or TMAOH) is a quaternary ammonium salt with molecular formula N(CH_{3})_{4}^{+}OH^{−}, abbreviated NMe_{4}^{+}OH^{−}, where Me stands for the methyl group, –CH_{3}. It is commonly encountered in the form of concentrated solutions in water or methanol. TMAH in solid state and its aqueous solutions are all colorless, but may be yellowish if impure. Although TMAH has virtually no odor when pure, samples often have a strong fishy smell due to presence of trimethylamine, which is a common impurity. TMAH has several diverse industrial and research applications.

== Chemical properties ==
=== Structure ===
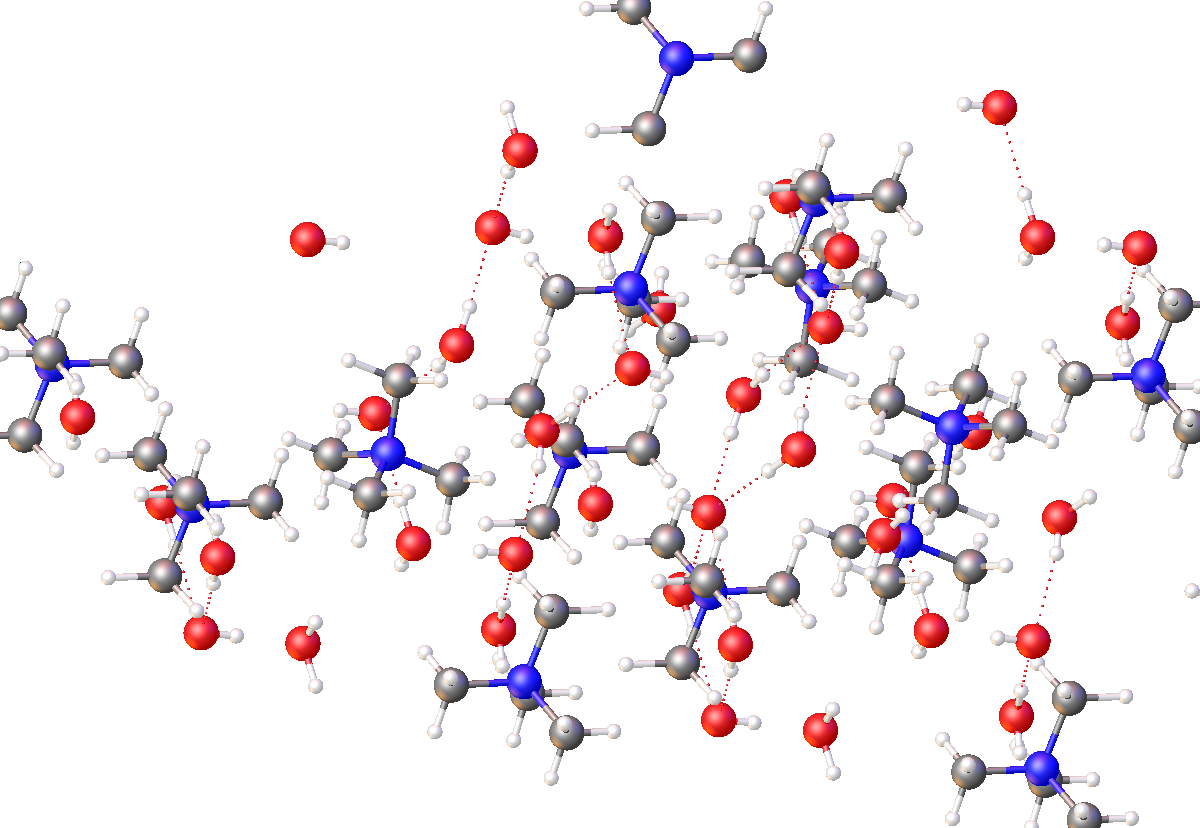
Structure of Me_{4}NOH monohydrate.

TMAH is most commonly encountered as an aqueous solution, in concentrations of ~2–25%, and less frequently as solutions in methanol. These solutions are identified by CAS number 75-59-2. Several hydrates such as N(CH_{3})_{4}OH·xH_{2}O. have been crystallized. These salts contain well separated Me_{4}N^{+} cations and hydroxide anions. The hydroxide groups are linked by hydrogen bonds to the water of crystallization. Anhydrous TMAH has not been isolated.

=== Preparation ===
One of the earliest preparations is that of Walker and Johnston in 1905, who made it by the salt metathesis reaction of tetramethylammonium chloride and potassium hydroxide in dry methanol, in which TMAH is soluble, but potassium chloride is not:

NMe_{4}^{+}Cl^{−} + KOH → NMe_{4}^{+}OH^{−} + KCl

That report also provides details for isolation of TMAH as its pentahydrate, noting the existence of a trihydrate, and emphasizes the avidity which even the former exhibits for atmospheric moisture and carbon dioxide. The authors reported a melting point of 62–63 °C for the pentahydrate, and solubility in water of about 220 g/100 mL at 15 °C.

=== Reactions ===
TMAH is a stable compound, with a half-life longer than 61 h in 6 M NaOH at 160 °C.

TMAH undergoes simple acid-base reactions to produce tetramethylammonium (TMA) salts whose anion is derived from the acid used. Illustrative is the preparation of tetramethylammonium fluoride:

NMe_{4}^{+}OH^{−} + HF → NMe_{4}^{+}F^{−} + H_{2}O

Solutions of TMAH may be used to make other tetramethylammonium salts in metathesis reactions with ammonium (NH_{4}^{+}) salts. For example, tetramethylammonium thiocyanate may be prepared from ammonium thiocyanate as follows:

NMe_{4}^{+}OH^{−} + NH_{4}^{+}SCN^{−} → NMe_{4}^{+}SCN^{−} + NH_{3} + H_{2}O

TMAH and many other TMA salts containing simple anions thermally decompose into trimethylamine. Dimethyl ether is a major decomposition product rather than methanol. The idealized equation is:

2 NMe_{4}^{+}OH^{−} → 2 NMe_{3} + MeOMe + H_{2}O

=== Properties ===
TMAH is a very strong base.

== Uses ==
TMAH is used industrially for anisotropic etching of silicon. It is used as a basic solvent in the development of acidic photoresists in the photolithography process, and is highly effective in stripping photoresists. TMAH has some phase transfer catalyst properties.

TMAH is used as a surfactant in the synthesis of ferrofluids and to inhibit nanoparticle aggregation.

TMAH is one of the most common reagents used in thermochemolysis, an analytical technique involving both pyrolysis and chemical derivatization of analytes.

=== Wet anisotropic etching ===
TMAH belongs to the family of quaternary ammonium hydroxide (QAH) solutions and is commonly used to anisotropically etch silicon. TMAH is preferred over sodium or potassium hydroxide in applications that are sensitive to metal ion contamination. Typical etching temperatures are between 70 and 90 °C and typical concentrations are 5–25 wt.% TMAH in water. For etching the (100) face of silicon, the etching rates generally increase with temperature and decrease with TMAH concentration. Surface roughness of etched (100) silicon decreases with increasing TMAH concentration, and smooth surfaces can be obtained with 20% TMAH solutions. Etch rates are typically in the 0.1–1 micrometer per minute range.

Common masking materials for long etches in TMAH include silicon dioxide (LPCVD and thermal) and silicon nitride. Silicon nitride has a negligible etch rate in TMAH. The etch rate for silicon dioxide in TMAH varies with the quality of the film, but is generally on the order of 0.1 nm/minute.

== Toxicology ==
The tetramethylammonium cation affects nerves and muscles, causing difficulties in breathing, muscular paralysis and possibly death. It is structurally related to acetylcholine, an important neurotransmitter at both the neuromuscular junction and autonomic ganglia. When it acts as an agonist, this structural similarity is reflected in its mechanism of toxicity – it binds to and activates the nicotinic acetylcholine receptors, although they may become desensitized in continued presence of the agonist. The action of tetramethylammonium is most pronounced in autonomic ganglia, so it is traditionally classified as a ganglion-stimulant drug.

The ganglionic effects may have contributed to deaths following accidental industrial exposure. "Chemical burns" induced by this strong base are also severe. There is evidence that poisoning and even death can occur through skin-contact with low concentration solutions of TMAH.
