= Tetramethylammonium fluoride =

Names
- Preferred IUPAC name N,N,N-Trimethylmethanaminium fluoride

Identifiers
CAS Number	373-68-2
3D model (JSmol)	Interactive image
ChemSpider	61120
ECHA InfoCard	100.006.154
EC Number	206-769-0
PubChem CID	67803
CompTox Dashboard (EPA)	DTXSID40883374
- InChI: InChI=1S/C4H12N.FH/c1-5(2,3)4;/h1-4H3;1H/q+1;/p-1 Key: GTDKXDWWMOMSFL-UHFFFAOYSA-M
- SMILES: C[N+](C)(C)C.[F-]

Properties
Chemical formula	C_{4}H_{12}FN
Molar mass	93.145 g·mol^{−1}
Appearance	white solid

Hazards
- GHS labelling
Pictograms	(GHS07: Exclamation mark)
Signal word	Warning
Hazard statements	H302, H312, H315, H319, H332, H335
Precautionary statements	P261, P264, P270, P271, P280, P301+P312, P302+P352, P304+P312, P304+P340, P305+P351+P338, P312, P321, P322, P330, P332+P313, P337+P313, P362, P363, P403+P233, P405, P501
- Except where otherwise noted, data are given for materials in their standard state (at 25 °C [77 °F], 100 kPa). Infobox references

Tetramethylammonium fluoride, commonly abbreviated TMAF, is the quaternary ammonium salt with the formula (CH_{3})_{4}NF. This hygroscopic white solid is a source of “naked fluoride": fluoride ions not complexed with a metal atom. Most other soluble salts of fluoride are in fact bifluorides, HF_{2}^{–}. Historically, there have been two main approaches to prepare tetramethylammonium fluoride: hydrofluoric acid neutralization of tetramethylammonium hydroxide, and salt metathesis between different ammonium salts and inorganic fluoride sources, such as KF or CsF. Because the fluoride anion is extremely basic, the salt slowly reacts with acetonitrile, inducing dimerization to CH_{3}C(NH_{2})=CHCN, which co-crystallizes.

== Related salts ==
- Tetramethylphosphonium fluoride (CH_{3})_{4}PF forms stable acetonitrile solutions. It is prepared from the ylide and potassium bifluoride:

(CH_{3})_{3}P=CH_{2} + KHF_{2} → (CH_{3})_{4}PF + KF
Gaseous tetramethylphosphonium fluoride exists as the phosphorane but autoionizes in acetonitrile solution. A more elaborate phosphazenium salt ([(CH_{3})_{2}N)_{3}P]_{2}N^{+}F^{−}) is also known.

- Anhydrous Tetrabutylammonium fluoride has been prepared by the reaction of hexafluorobenzene and tetrabutylammonium cyanide.
