= Choline chloride =

- Choline chloride

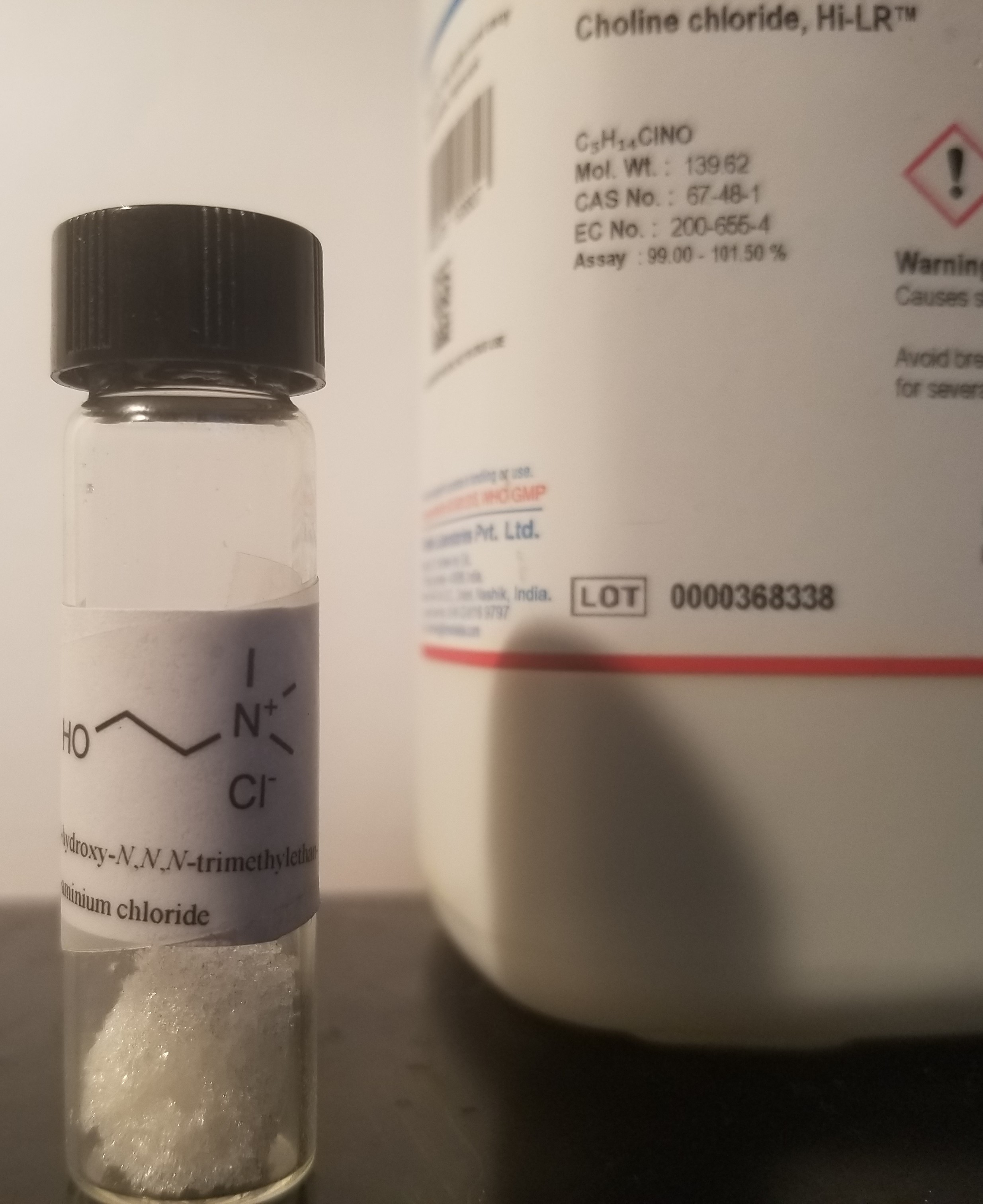

Names
- Preferred IUPAC name 2-Hydroxy-N,N,N-trimethylethan-1-aminium chloride
- Other names: (2-Hydroxyethyl)trimethylammonium chloride; Hepacholine; Biocolina; Lipotril

Identifiers
CAS Number	67-48-1
3D model (JSmol)	Interactive image
ChEBI	CHEBI:133341
ChEMBL	ChEMBL282468
ChemSpider	5974
ECHA InfoCard	100.000.596
E number	E1001(iii) (additional chemicals)
PubChem CID	522265
UNII	45I14D8O27
CompTox Dashboard (EPA)	DTXSID4020325
- InChI: InChI=1S/C5H14NO.ClH/c1-6(2,3)4-5-7;/h7H,4-5H2,1-3H3;1H/q+1;/p-1 Key: SGMZJAMFUVOLNK-UHFFFAOYSA-M; InChI=1/C5H14NO.ClH/c1-6(2,3)4-5-7;/h7H,4-5H2,1-3H3;1H/q+1;/p-1 Key: SGMZJAMFUVOLNK-REWHXWOFAH
- SMILES: [Cl-].OCC[N+](C)(C)C

Properties
Chemical formula	[(CH_{3})_{3}NCH_{2}CH_{2}OH]^{+}Cl^{−}
Molar mass	139.62 g·mol^{−1}
Appearance	White hygroscopic crystals
Melting point	302 °C (576 °F; 575 K) (decomposes)
Solubility in water	very soluble (>650 g/L)

Hazards
- Occupational safety and health (OHS/OSH)
Main hazards	Corrosive
- GHS labelling
Signal word	Danger
NFPA 704 (fire diamond)	2 0 0
Safety data sheet (SDS)	External MSDS
- Except where otherwise noted, data are given for materials in their standard state (at 25 °C [77 °F], 100 kPa). verify (what is ?) Infobox references

Choline chloride is an organic compound with the formula [(CH_{3})_{3}NCH_{2}CH_{2}OH]^{+}Cl^{−}. It is a quaternary ammonium salt, consisting of choline cations ([(CH_{3})_{3}NCH_{2}CH_{2}OH]^{+}) and chloride anions (Cl^{−}). It is a bifunctional compound, meaning, it contains both a quaternary ammonium functional group and a hydroxyl functional group. The cation of this salt, choline, occurs in nature in living beings. Choline chloride is a white, water-soluble salt used mainly as an animal and human dietary supplement.

== Synthesis ==
In the laboratory, choline can be prepared by methylation of dimethylethanolamine with methyl chloride.

Choline chloride is mass-produced with world production estimated at 160 000 tons in 1999. Industrially, it is produced by the reaction of ethylene oxide, hydrogen chloride, and trimethylamine, or from the pre-formed salt:

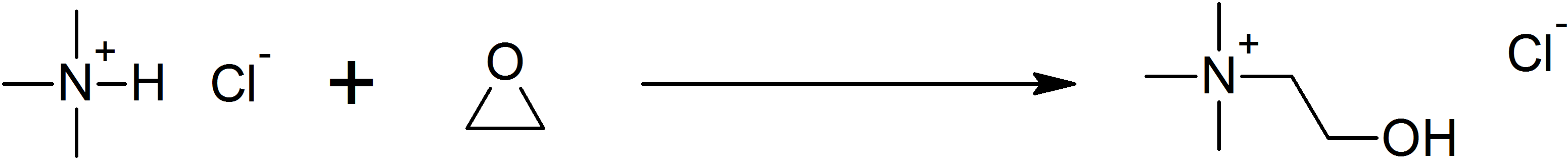

Choline chloride can also be made by treating trimethylamine with 2-chloroethanol.

(CH_{3})_{3}N + ClCH_{2}CH_{2}OH → [(CH_{3})_{3}NCH_{2}CH_{2}OH]^{+}Cl^{−}

== Applications ==
It is a dietary supplement used to accelerate the growth of chickens.

It forms a deep eutectic solvent with urea, ethylene glycol, glycerol, and many other compounds.

It is also used as a clay control additive in fluids used for hydraulic fracturing.

== Related salts ==
Other commercial choline salts are choline hydroxide and choline bitartrate. In foodstuffs, the compound is often present as phosphatidylcholine.
