= Tetraethylammonium hydroxide =

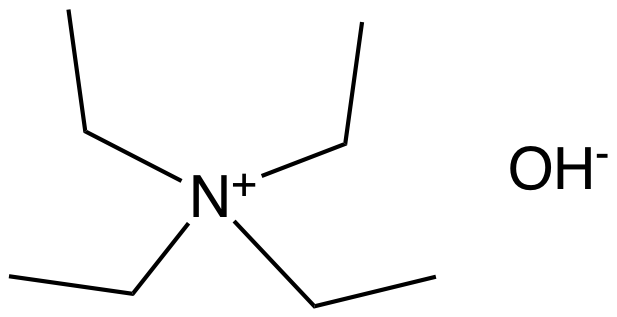

Names
- IUPAC name N,N,N-Triethylethanaminium hydroxide

Identifiers
CAS Number	77-98-5
3D model (JSmol)	Interactive image
ChemSpider	6263
ECHA InfoCard	100.000.977
EC Number	201-073-3
PubChem CID	6509
UNII	RA8VU41B1F
CompTox Dashboard (EPA)	DTXSID30883222
- InChI: InChI=1S/C8H20N.H2O/c1-5-9(6-2,7-3)8-4;/h5-8H2,1-4H3;1H2/q+1;/p-1 Key: LRGJRHZIDJQFCL-UHFFFAOYSA-M
- SMILES: CC[N+](CC)(CC)CC.[OH-]

Properties
Chemical formula	C_{8}H_{21}NO
Molar mass	147.262 g·mol^{−1}
Appearance	colorless solutions

Hazards
- GHS labelling
Pictograms	(GHS05: Corrosive) (GHS09: Environmental hazard)
Signal word	Warning
Hazard statements	H314, H410
Precautionary statements	P260, P264, P273, P280, P301+P330+P331, P303+P361+P353, P304+P340, P305+P351+P338, P310, P321, P363, P391, P405, P501
- Except where otherwise noted, data are given for materials in their standard state (at 25 °C [77 °F], 100 kPa). Infobox references

Tetraethylammonium hydroxide is the organic compound with the formula [(CH_{3}CH_{2})_{4}N]OH, abbreviated [Et_{4}N]OH, where Et stands for ethyl. It is the tetraethylammonium salt of hydroxide. It is used and dispensed as solutions in water or alcohols, which are colorless and highly alkaline. The compound is a common reagent in organic synthesis. It is also employed in the preparation of zeolites.

== Structure ==
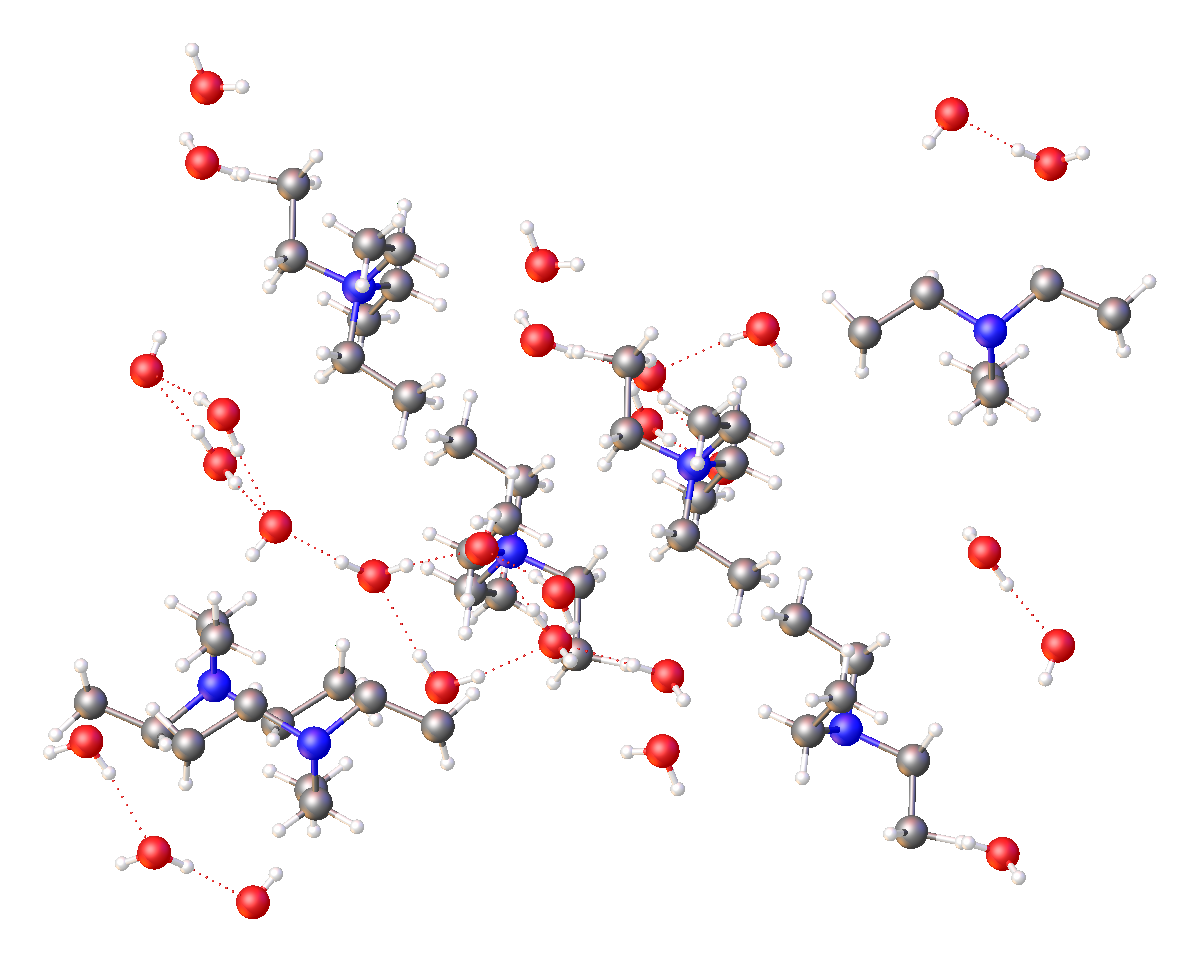
Structure of Et_{4}NOH^{.}4H_{2}O.

Tetraethylammonium hydroxide is most commonly encountered as an aqueous solution. Several hydrates NEt_{4}OH·xH_{2}O. have been crystallized, including x = 4, 5, 9. These salts feature well separated Et_{4}N^{+} cations and hydroxide anions. The hydroxide groups are linked by hydrogen bonds to the water of crystallization. Anhydrous tetraethylammonium hydroxide has not been isolated.

== Synthesis and reactions ==
It is prepared from tetraethylammonium bromide by salt metathesis, using a hydroxide-loaded ion exchange column or by the action of silver oxide. Attempted isolation of Et_{4}NOH induces Hofmann elimination, leading to triethylamine and ethylene.

Treatment of Et_{4}NOH with a wide range of acids gives water and the other tetraethylammonium salts:

Et_{4}NOH + HX → Et_{4}NX + H_{2}O
