= Tetramethylammonium =

Polyatomic ion (N(CH3)4, charge +1)

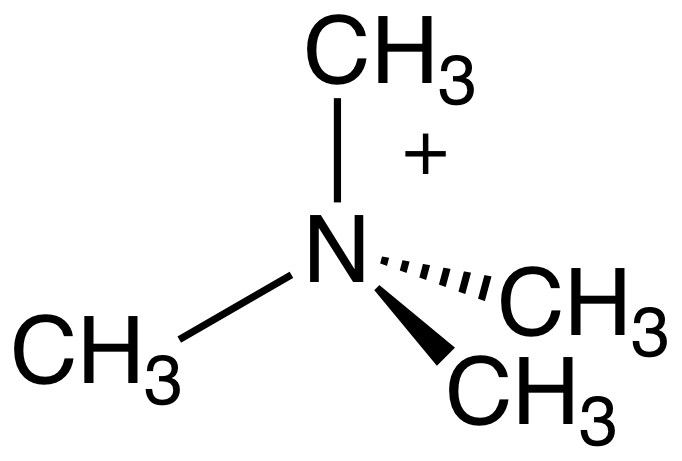

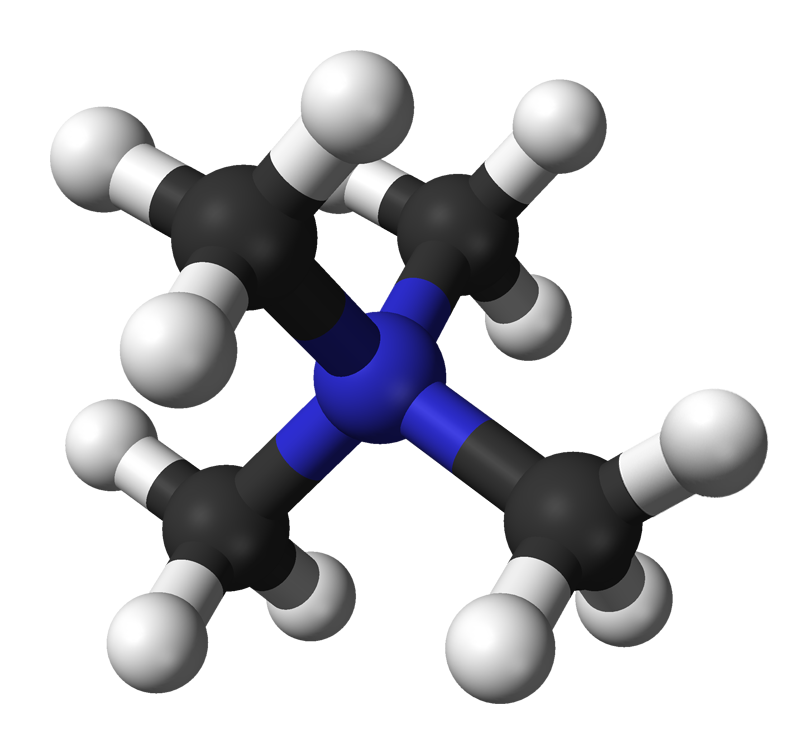

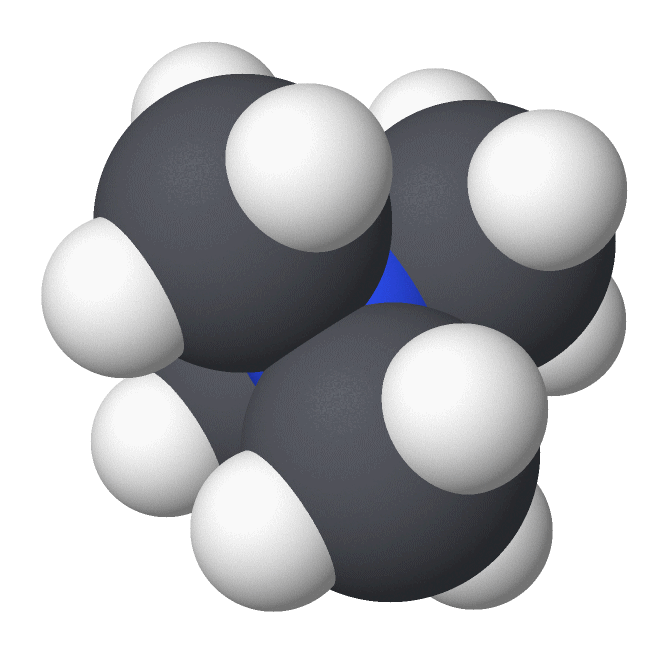

Names
- Preferred IUPAC name N,N,N-Trimethylmethanaminium
- Other names Tetramethylammonium; Tetramethylazanium; Tetramine

Identifiers
CAS Number	51-92-3
3D model (JSmol)	Interactive image
ChEBI	CHEBI:46020
ChemSpider	6140
PubChem CID	6380
UNII	H0W55235FC
CompTox Dashboard (EPA)	DTXSID3048071
- InChI: InChI=1S/C4H12N/c1-5(2,3)4/h1-4H3/q+1 Key: QEMXHQIAXOOASZ-UHFFFAOYSA-N
- SMILES: C[N+](C)(C)C

Properties
Chemical formula	C_{4}H_{12}N+
Molar mass	74.14 g/mol

Related compounds
Related isoelectronic molecules	neo-pentane
- Except where otherwise noted, data are given for materials in their standard state (at 25 °C [77 °F], 100 kPa). Infobox references

Tetramethylammonium (TMA) is the simplest quaternary ammonium cation. It has the chemical formula [Me_{4}N]^{+} and consists of four methyl groups (−CH_{3}, denoted Me) attached to a central nitrogen atom. The cation is isoelectronic with neopentane (Me_{4}C). It is positively-charged and can only be isolated in association with a counter-ion. Common salts include tetramethylammonium chloride and tetramethylammonium hydroxide. Tetramethylammonium salts are used in chemical synthesis and in pharmacological research. It confers no color to its salts.

== Common nomenclature ==
In the toxicological literature, naturally occurring tetramethylammonium (anion unspecified) is often referred to by the name "tetramine". Unfortunately, this non-systematic or "trivial" name is also used for other chemical entities, including a toxic rodenticide (Tetramethylenedisulfotetramine). Similarly, the acronym "TMA", which is frequently used for tetramethylammonium in the pharmacological literature, may also refer to the investigational drug 3,4,5-trimethoxyamphetamine, which, being a close structural analog of mescaline, has been the subject of numerous publications. TMA can also be used for trimethylamine, which is structurally related to tetramethylammonium but has very different toxicological properties.

== Occurrence ==
Tetramethylammonium has been detected in or isolated from a number of marine organisms, mostly amongst the Cnidaria and Mollusca, notably in some species of Neptunea (commonly called whelks) that are eaten by humans. It has also been found in one plant, the African Courbonia virgata (Cappariaceae). TMA also occurs within the crystal structure of tsaregorodtsevite, a rare sodalite group mineral with the formula N(CH_{3})_{4}AlSi_{5}O_{12} found on Gora Yaruta Mountain in Khanty-Mansi Autonomous Okrug, Russia.

== Preparation, reactions, solution properties ==
Tetramethylammonium ion is typically prepared by the reaction between trimethylamine and a methyl chloride:

Me_{3}N + MeCl → Me_{4}N^{+}Cl^{−}

[^{14}C]-labeled TMA has been made by this method.

Although this reaction is suitable for the common halides, tetramethylammonium salts with more complex anions may be prepared by salt metathesis reactions, e.g. tetramethylammonium borohydride has been made from tetramethylammonium hydroxide as shown:

Me_{4}N^{+}[OH]^{−} + Na^{+}[BH_{4}]^{−} → Me_{4}N^{+}[BH_{4}]^{−} + Na^{+} + HO^{−}

Although TMA salts do possess some of the phase-transfer catalytic properties that are characteristic of quaternary ammonium compounds, they tend to behave atypically because of the relatively high hydrophilicity of the TMA cation.

TMA cation is hydrophilic. The octanol-water partition coefficient of TMA iodide, P_{o-w}, is 1.2×10^{−4} (or log P ≈ −3.92).

In the TMA cation, the methyl groups are tetrahedrally arranged around the central N atom, as is evident from X-ray crystallographic studies of various of its salts. From measurements taken on molecular models, it has been estimated that the diameter of the TMA ion is ~0.6 nm; From more accurate physico-chemical measurements, the ionic radius for TMA is given as 0.322 nm; several thermodynamic parameters for the TMA ion are also recorded. The paper by Aue et al. gives a good discussion of the methods by which the ionic radius was determined.

== Pharmacology ==
The pharmacological literature on tetramethylammonium is extensive. In general, TMA is a cholinomimetic whose effects mimic most of those produced by exogenous acetylcholine.

Pharmacological experiments with TMA have been performed using one of its salts, typically the chloride, bromide or iodide, since these anions were not expected to interfere with the actions of the TMA cation. In the early pharmacological literature, however, there are references to the use of "tetramethylammonium hydroxide" or "tetramethylammonium hydrate", which were meant to facilitate comparison between weight-based dosages of different TMA salts, but did not involve the actual use of tetramethylammonium hydroxide, whose strong basicity would have been incompatible with physiological conditions.

A thorough review of the pharmacology of TMA from a toxicological perspective, and current up to 1989, has been given by Anthoni and co-workers. Thus, the effects of TMA on nicotinic and muscarinic ACh receptors first stimulate, then block neurotransmission in sympathetic and parasympathetic ganglia, with depolarization. TMA also acts as an agonist at muscarinic receptors in post-ganglionic nerve endings in smooth muscles, cardiac muscle, and exocrine glands. In skeletal muscle, TMA initially causes fasciculations, then paralysis, as a result of the depolarization from stimulation of nicotinic ACh receptors.

=== Absorption; distribution; metabolism; excretion (ADME) ===
Absorption: TMA is readily absorbed from the gastro-intestinal tract. Studies on the rat jejunum indicated that TMA absorption involved a combination of simple diffusion and carrier-mediated transport, with nearly 100% absorption occurring within 60 to 90 minutes. By comparison, tetraethylammonium and tetrapropylammonium ions were only absorbed to the extent of ~30%.

Distribution: Intraperitoneal administration of radio-labeled tetramethylammonium iodide to mice showed that TMA was rapidly distributed to all parts of the body, with the highest concentrations being in the kidney and liver. Similar results were reported by Neef and co-workers using rats.

Metabolism and excretion: Parenteral administration of radio-labeled tetramethylammonium iodide to rats resulted in almost the whole dose being excreted in urine, without any evidence of metabolic transformation.

== Toxicology ==
The human toxicology of TMA (under the name "tetramine") has been studied primarily in the context of accidental poisoning after ingestion of Neptunea species. Symptoms include the following: nausea, vomiting, headache, vertigo/dizziness, impaired vision/temporary blindness, diplopia, photophobia, lack of balance, feeling of intoxication and urticaria. These symptoms appear within 30 minutes but recovery is usually complete after a few hours. Only one account of human death following ingestion of TMA (from the plant Courbonia virgata) has been recorded. Although many of these symptoms can be accounted for on the basis of impairment of neurotransmission in the autonomic nervous system, there also seem to be distinct indications of central effects.

In animal studies, parenteral administration of TMA-containing extracts from Neptunea to mice, cats and fish mainly show effects involving skeletal muscles: there are muscular fasciculations, convulsions, loss of balance, motor paralysis and ultimately cessation of respiration.

The lethal oral dose of TMA for humans has been estimated at 3–4 mg/kg. The lethal dose for rats was estimated to be ~45–50 mg/kg, p.o., and ~15 mg/kg, i.p.

=== Acute toxicity ===
LD_{50} for TMA chloride: 25 mg/kg (mouse, i.p.); 40 mg/kg (mouse, s.c.). LC_{50} for TMA chloride: 462 mg/L for 96 hrs. (Fathead minnow, Pimephales promelas).

== See also ==
- Tetraethylammonium
