= Solubility chart =

Chart describing whether ionic compounds dissolve or precipitate

A solubility chart is a type of chart that describes whether the ionic compounds formed from different combinations of cations and anions dissolve in or precipitate from solution.

== Chart ==
The following chart shows the solubility of various ionic compounds in water at 1 atm pressure and room temperature (approx. 25 °C, 298.15 K). "Soluble" means the ionic compound does not precipitate, while "slightly soluble" and "insoluble" mean that a solid will precipitate; "slightly soluble" compounds like calcium sulfate may require heat to precipitate. For compounds with multiple hydrates, the solubility of the most soluble hydrate is shown.

Some compounds, such as nickel oxalate, will not precipitate immediately even though they are insoluble, requiring a few minutes to precipitate out.

Key
S	highly soluble or miscible	≥20 g/L
sS	slightly soluble	0.1~20 g/L
I	relatively insoluble	<0.1 g/L
R	reacts with or in water	—N/a
?	unavailable	—N/a

Ions names and symbols	Halogens					Chalcogens				Pnictogens			Crystallogens				
Ions names and symbols	Fluoride F^{−}	Chloride Cl^{−}	Bromide Br^{−}	Iodide I^{−}	Perchlorate ClO^{−}_{4}	Oxide O^{2−}	Hydroxide OH^{−}	Sulfide S^{2−}	Sulfate SO^{2−}_{4}	Nitrate NO^{−}_{3} (Note: Compounds that include ammonium (NH^{+}_{4}), chlorate (ClO^{−}_{3}), or nitrate (NO^{−}_{3}) are soluble without exceptions. Compounds that include carbonate (CO^{2−}_{3}) are insoluble, unless the compound includes group 1 elements or ammonium.)	Azide N^{−}_{3}	Phosphate PO^{3−}_{4}	Carbonate CO^{2−}_{3}	Cyanide CN^{−}	Thiocyanate SCN^{−}	Acetate C_{2}H_{3}O^{−}_{2}	Oxalate C_{2}O^{2−}_{4}
Hydrogen H^{+}	S	S	S	S	S	N/A	N/A	sS	S	S	S	S	S	S	S	S	S
Ammonium NH^{+}_{4}	S	S	S	S	S	S (Note: "Ammonium oxide" does not exist. However, its theoretical molecular formula (NH^{+}_{4})_{2}O^{2−} represents that of aqueous ammonia.)	S	R	S	S	S	S	S	S	S	S	S
Lithium Li^{+}	sS	S	S	S	S	R	S	R	S	S	S	sS	sS	S	S	S	S
Sodium Na^{+}	S	S	S	S	S	R	S	R	S	S	S	S	S	S	S	S	S
Potassium K^{+}	S	S	S	S	sS	R	S	R	S	S	S	S	S	S	S	S	S
Rubidium Rb^{+}	S	S	S	S	sS	R	S	R	S	S	S	S	S	S	S	S	S
Caesium Cs^{+}	S	S	S	S	sS	R	S	R	S	S	S	S	S	S	S	S	S
Beryllium Be^{2+}	S	S	S	R	S	I	I	R	S	S	R	I	sS	R	S	S	S
Magnesium Mg^{2+}	sS	S	S	S	S	R	I	R	S	S	R	I	sS	R	S	S	sS
Calcium Ca^{2+}	I	S	S	S	S	R	sS	R	sS	S	S	I	I	R	S	S	sS
Strontium Sr^{2+}	sS	S	S	S	S	R	sS	R	sS	S	S	I	I	S	S	S	I
Barium Ba^{2+}	sS	S	S	S	S	R	S	R	I	S	S	I	I	S	S	S	I
Aluminium Al^{3+}	sS	S	S	S (Note: Partial electrolysis.)	S	I	I	R	S	S	R	I	R	R	S	S	I
Gallium Ga^{3+}	I	S	S	R	S	I	I	R	sS	S	R	I	R	R	S	S	?
Manganese(II) Mn^{2+}	sS	S	S	S	S	I	I	I	S	S	R	I	I	S	S	S	I
Iron(II) Fe^{2+}	sS	S	S	S	S	I	I	I	S	S	?	I	I	?	S	S	sS
Cobalt(II) Co^{2+}	sS	S	S	S	S	I	I	I	S	S	S	I	I	I	S	S	I
Nickel(II) Ni^{2+}	S	S	S	S	S	I	I	I	S	S	S	I	I	I	S	S	I
Copper(II) Cu^{2+}	sS	S	S	?	S	I	I	I	S	S	I	I	I (Note: The commonly encountered basic copper carbonate (Cu_{2}CO_{3}(OH)_{2}) is insoluble in water. True copper(II) carbonate (CuCO_{3}) is rare and reacts with water to form basic copper carbonate.)	I	I	S	I
Zinc Zn^{2+}	sS	S	S	S	S	I	I	I	S	S	R	I	I	I	S	S	I
Cadmium Cd^{2+}	S	S	S	S	S	I	I	I	S	S	S	I	I	sS	sS	S	I
Mercury(II) Hg^{2+}	R	S	sS	I	S	I	I	I	R	S	sS	I	I	S	sS	S	sS
Vanadium(III) V^{3+}	I	S	S	S	S	I	I	I	sS	S	?	I	?	?	S	?	?
Chromium(III) Cr^{3+}	sS	S	S	S	S	I	I	I	S	S	R	I	I	S	S	S	?
Iron(III) Fe^{3+}	S (Note: Anhydrous FeF_{3} is slightly soluble in water; FeF_{3}·3H_{2}O is much more soluble in water.)	S	S	R	S	I	I	I	S	S	S	sS	R	S	S	S (Note: The commonly encountered basic iron(III) acetate ([Fe_{3}O(OAc)_{6}(H_{2}O)_{3}]OAc) is insoluble in water. True iron(III) acetate (Fe(OAc)_{3}) is rare and is soluble in water.)	sS
Gold(III) Au^{3+}	R	S	sS	?	?	I	I	I	?	?	?	I	I	S	?	sS	?
Tin(II) Sn^{2+}	S	S	S	S	S	I	I	I	S	?	sS	I	I	?	I	R	sS
Lead(II) Pb^{2+}	sS	sS	sS	sS	S	I	sS	I	I	S	S	I	I	?	sS	S	I
Silver Ag^{+}	S	I	I	I	S	I	I	I	sS	S	I	I	I	I	I	sS	I
Mercury(I) Hg^{2+}_{2}	R	I	I	I	S	I	?	?	sS	S (Note: Slowly decomposes in water.)	I	?	I	I	?	S	?
	Fluoride F^{−}	Chloride Cl^{−}	Bromide Br^{−}	Iodide I^{−}	Perchlorate ClO^{−}_{4}	Oxide O^{2−}	Hydroxide OH^{−}	Sulfide S^{2−}	Sulfate SO^{2−}_{4}	Nitrate NO^{−}_{3}	Azide N^{−}_{3}	Phosphate PO^{3−}_{4}	Carbonate CO^{2−}_{3}	Cyanide CN^{−}	Thiocyanate SCN^{−}	Acetate C_{2}H_{3}O^{−}_{2}	Oxalate C_{2}O^{2−}_{4}

== See also ==
- Solubility rules
