= Cadmium cyanide =

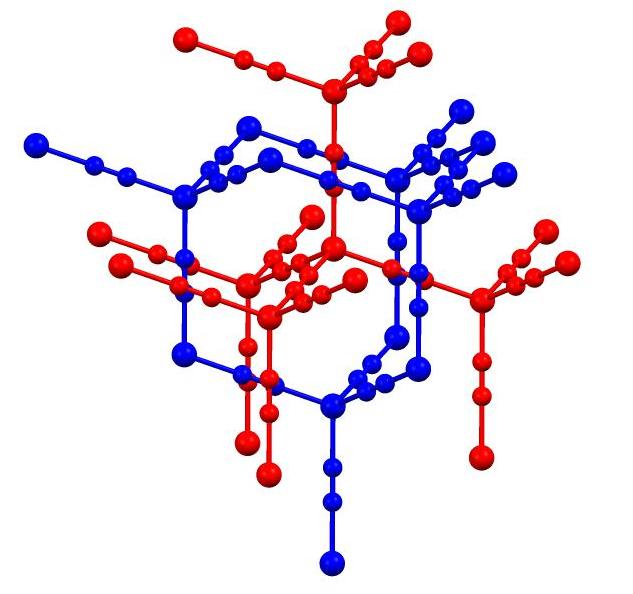
- Cadmium cyanide

Names
- IUPAC name Cadmium(II) cyanide

Identifiers
CAS Number	542-83-6
3D model (JSmol)	Interactive image
ChemSpider	61630
ECHA InfoCard	100.008.027
PubChem CID	68335
UNII	L520HA8ZUK
CompTox Dashboard (EPA)	DTXSID60969164
- InChI: InChI=1S/2CN.Cd/c2*1-2;/q2*-1;+2 Key: NHMJUOSYSOOPDM-UHFFFAOYSA-N; InChI=1/2CN.Cd/c2*1-2;/q2*-1;+2 Key: NHMJUOSYSOOPDM-UHFFFAOYAI
- SMILES: [Cd+2].[C-]#N.[C-]#N

Properties
Chemical formula	Cd(CN)_{2}
Molar mass	164.45 g/mol
Appearance	white cubic crystals
Density	2.226 g/cm^{3}
Solubility in water	1.71 g/100 mL (15 °C); 2.2 g/100 mL (20 °C)
Solubility	slightly soluble in alcohol dissolves in alkali, metal cyanides and hydroxides
Magnetic susceptibility (χ)	−54.0·10^{−6} cm^{3}/mol

Hazards
- NIOSH (US health exposure limits)
PEL (Permissible)	[1910.1027] TWA 0.005 mg/m^{3} (as Cd)
REL (Recommended)	Ca
IDLH (Immediate danger)	Ca [9 mg/m^{3} (as Cd)]

Related compounds
Other anions	Cadmium chloride, Cadmium iodide
Other cations	Zinc cyanide, Calcium cyanide, Magnesium cyanide
- Except where otherwise noted, data are given for materials in their standard state (at 25 °C [77 °F], 100 kPa). verify (what is ?) Infobox references

Cadmium cyanide is an inorganic compound with the formula Cd(CN)_{2}. It is a white crystalline compound that is used in electroplating. It is very toxic, along with other cadmium and cyanide compounds.

== Preparation and structure ==
Cadmium cyanide is prepared commercially by treating cadmium hydroxide with hydrogen cyanide:

Cd(OH)_{2} + 2 HCN → Cd(CN)_{2} + 2 H_{2}O

It can also be generated from tetracyanocadmate:

[Cd(CN)_{4}]^{2−} + CdCl_{2} → 2 Cd(CN)_{2} + 2 Cl^{−}

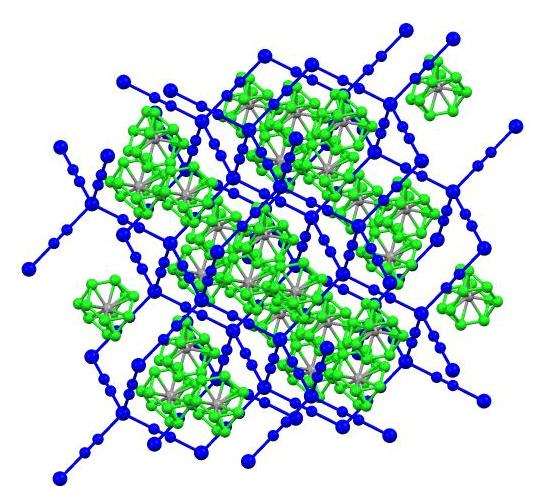
Structure of the clathrate consisting of cadmium cyanide host and carbon tetrachloride guest, Cd(CN)_{2}^{.}CCl_{4}. Blue = Cd(CN)_{2} framework, gray = C, green = disordered Cl.

Cadmium cyanide and zinc cyanide adopt similar structures. As such, each metal has tetrahedral coordination sphere. Cyanide ligands interconnect pairs of metal centers. Two of the resulting diamondoid structures are interpenetrated. The structure is related to that of cristobalite, a polymorphs of SiO_{2}. This structural similarity of cadmium dicyanide and cristobalite was foundational in the development of mineralomimetic chemistry: "the build-up of mineral-like structures using materials that never give stable minerals."

== Reactions and uses ==
It is used as an electrolyte for electrodeposition of thin metallic cadmium coatings on metal to protect against corrosion.

Like zinc cyanide, cadmium cyanide is fairly soluble in water, which is unusual for transition metal cyanides. The solubility increases with the additional cyanide, this reaction proceeding via "[Cd(CN)_{3}]^{−}" and [Cd(CN)_{4}]^{2−}. With acids, its solutions evolve hydrogen cyanide. When it is crystallized in the presence of certain small molecules, it forms clathrates.
