= Nickel(II) thiocyanate =

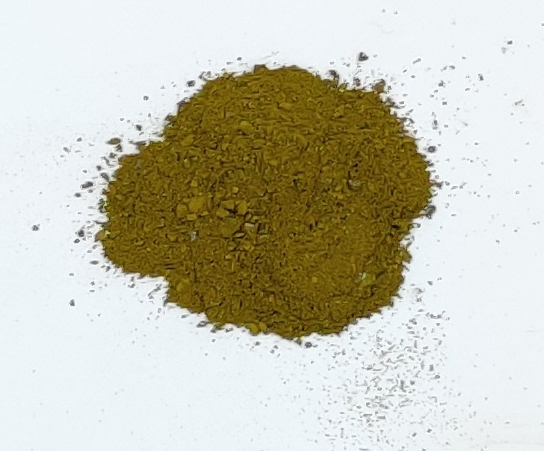
- Sample of nickel(II) thiocyanate

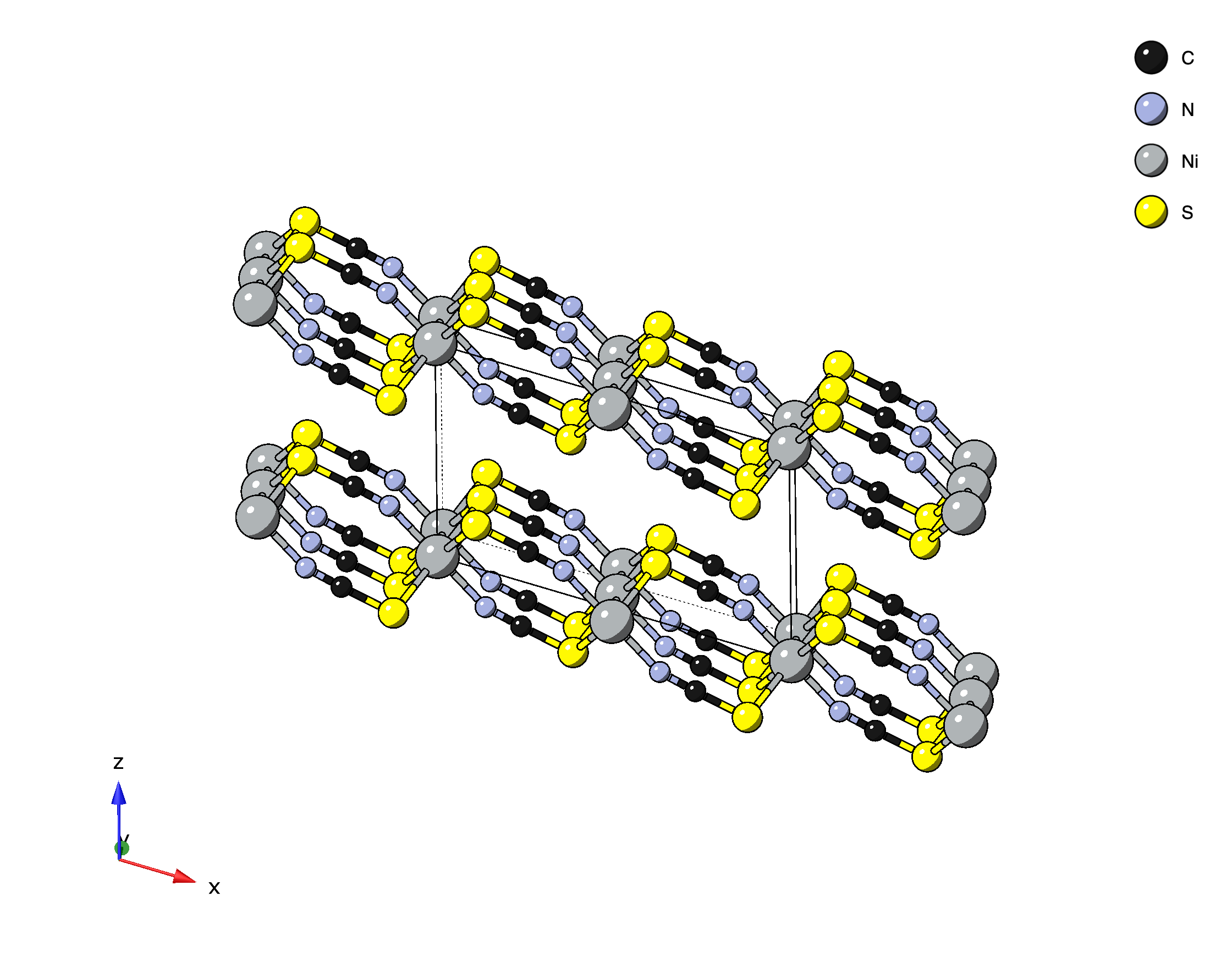
- Crystal structure of nickel(II) thiocyanate

Identifiers
CAS Number	13689-92-4
3D model (JSmol)	Interactive image
ChemSpider	4318849
ECHA InfoCard	100.033.808
EC Number	237-205-1
PubChem CID	5145251
CompTox Dashboard (EPA)	DTXSID30929573
- InChI: InChI=1S/2CHNS.Ni/c2*2-1-3;/h2*3H;/q;;+2/p-2 Key: ALYMILAYQDOMFU-UHFFFAOYSA-L
- SMILES: C(#N)[S-].C(#N)[S-].[Ni+2]

Properties
Chemical formula	Ni(SCN)_{2}
Molar mass	174.86 g/mol
Appearance	green-brown powder
Density	2.59 g/cm^{3}
Melting point	decomposes
Magnetic susceptibility (χ)	5×10^{−3} cm^{3}/mol

Structure
Crystal structure	Hg(SCN)_{2} structure
Coordination geometry	Octahedral

Hazards
- GHS labelling
Pictograms	(GHS07: Exclamation mark) (GHS08: Health hazard) (GHS09: Environmental hazard)
Signal word	Danger
Hazard statements	H317, H334, H341, H350i, H360D, H372, H410
Precautionary statements	P201, P202, P260, P264, P270, P272, P273, P280, P281, P285, P302+P352, P304+P341, P308+P313, P314, P321, P333+P313, P342+P311, P363, P391, P405, P501

Related compounds
Other anions	Nickel(II) bromide; Nickel(II) chloride; Nickel(II) iodide
Other cations	Copper(I) thiocyanate; Cobalt(II) thiocyanate; Mercury(II) thiocyanate; Ammonium thiocyanate; Potassium thiocyanate
- Except where otherwise noted, data are given for materials in their standard state (at 25 °C [77 °F], 100 kPa). Infobox references

Nickel(II) thiocyanate is a coordination polymer with formula Ni(SCN)_{2}. It is a green-brown solid and its crystal structure was determined first in 1982.

== Structure ==
The structure of Ni(SCN)_{2} was determined via single-crystal X-ray diffraction and consists of two-dimensional sheets held together through Van der Waals forces. It belongs to mercury thiocyanate structure-type and can be considered a distorted form of the NiBr_{2} (CdI_{2}) structure. Each nickel is octahedrally coordinated by four sulfurs and two nitrogens. The sulfur end of the SCN^{−} ligand is doubly bridging.

== Synthesis ==
Nickel(II) thiocyanate can be prepared via the reaction of barium thiocyanate and nickel sulfate solutions. After removal of the precipitated barium sulfate, the solution is allowed to evaporate leaving microcrystalline Ni(SCN)_{2}.

== Magnetism ==
Nickel(II) thiocyanate, like nickel(II) iodide, nickel(II) bromide and nickel(II) chloride, is an antiferromagnet at low temperatures.
