= Chromium(III) perchlorate =

Names
- Other names: Chromium(III) perchlorate; Chromium triperchlorate

Identifiers
CAS Number	13537-21-8; hexahydrate: 55147-94-9
3D model (JSmol)	Interactive image; hexahydrate: Interactive image
ChemSpider	55552; hexahydrate: 21241320
EC Number	236-905-4
PubChem CID	61644; hexahydrate: 12987845
CompTox Dashboard (EPA)	DTXSID40890669; hexahydrate: DTXSID00514430
- InChI: InChI=1S/3ClHO4.Cr/c3*2-1(3,4)5;/h3*(H,2,3,4,5);/q;;;+3/p-3 Key: ZKJMJQVGBCLHFL-UHFFFAOYSA-K; hexahydrate: InChI=1S/3ClHO4.Cr.6H2O/c3*2-1(3,4)5;;;;;;;/h3*(H,2,3,4,5);;6*1H2/q;;;+3;;;;;;/p-3 Key: AWECJTDFTJYSGZ-UHFFFAOYSA-K
- SMILES: [O-]Cl(=O)(=O)=O.[O-]Cl(=O)(=O)=O.[O-]Cl(=O)(=O)=O.[Cr+3]; hexahydrate: O.O.O.O.O.O.[O-]Cl(=O)(=O)=O.[O-]Cl(=O)(=O)=O.[O-]Cl(=O)(=O)=O.[Cr+3]

Properties
Chemical formula	Cr(ClO_{4})_{3}
Molar mass	350.3489
Appearance	cyan solid
Solubility in water	anhydrous: 58 g/100 mL (25 °C) hexahydrate: 130 g/100 mL (20 °C)
Solubility	soluble in ethanol

Hazards
- GHS labelling
Pictograms	(GHS03: Oxidizing) (GHS07: Exclamation mark)
Signal word	Danger
Hazard statements	H272, H302, H315, H317, H319
Precautionary statements	P210, P220, P261, P264, P264+P265, P270, P272, P280, P301+P317, P302+P352, P305+P351+P338, P321, P330, P333+P317, P337+P317, P362+P364, P370+P378, P501

Related compounds
Related compounds	Chromium(III) chloride Chromium chlorate
- Except where otherwise noted, data are given for materials in their standard state (at 25 °C [77 °F], 100 kPa). Infobox references

Chromium(III) perchlorate is an inorganic compound, a salt with the chemical formula Cr(ClO_{4})_{3}. It has many hydrates, including a hexahydrate Cr(ClO_{4})_{3}·6H_{2}O and a nonahydrate Cr(ClO_{4})_{3}·9H_{2}O. They water-soluble cyan solids.

== Preparation ==
Chromium perchlorate can be prepared by reacting chromium(III) oxide or chromium(III) hydroxide with perchloric acid:

Cr_{2}O_{3} + 6 HClO_{4} → 2 Cr(ClO_{4})_{3} + 3 H_{2}O

== Reactions ==
Chromium perchlorate reacts with NH_{3} in suitable conditions to form an orange hexammine complex Cr(ClO_{4})_{3}·6NH_{3}. Other compounds with the general formula Cr(ClO_{4})_{3}·xNH_{3} are known. When x = 3, the compound is red, when x = 4 or 5, it is orange. The hexaammine complex will explode.

It forms complexes with N_{2}H_{4}, such as purple Cr(ClO_{4})_{3}·2N_{2}H_{4}.

It can also form complexes with urea (CO(NH_{2})_{2}), such as Cr(ClO_{4})_{3}·6CO(NH_{2})_{2} with a hexagonal structure.
