= Aquation =

Aquation is the chemical reaction incorporating "one or more integral molecules of water" with or without displacement of other atoms or groups. The term is typically employed to refer to reactions of metal complexes where an anion is displaced by water. For example, bromopentaamminecobalt(III) undergoes the following aquation reaction to give a metal aquo complex:

[Co(NH_{3})_{5}Br]^{2+} + H_{2}O → [Co(NH_{3})_{5}(H_{2}O)]^{3+} + Br^{−}

This reaction is catalyzed both by acid and by base. Acid catalysis involves protonation of the bromide, converting it to a better leaving group. Base hydrolysis proceeds by the S_{N}1cB mechanism, which begins with deprotonation of an ammonia ligand.

== See also ==
- Hydration reaction
