= Cobalt(II) bromide =

- Structure of cobalt(II) bromide tetrahydrate

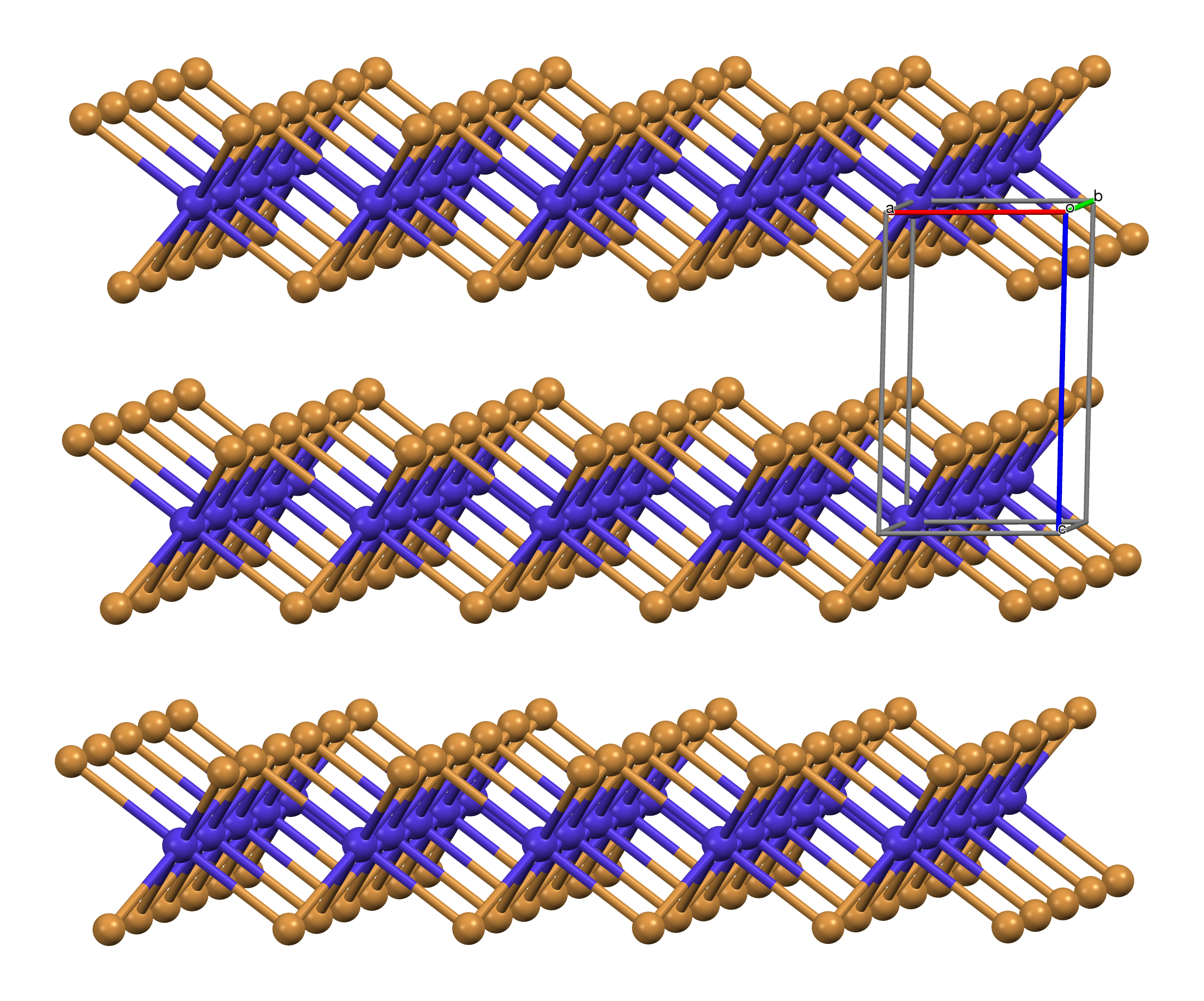
- Crystal structure of cobalt(II) bromide

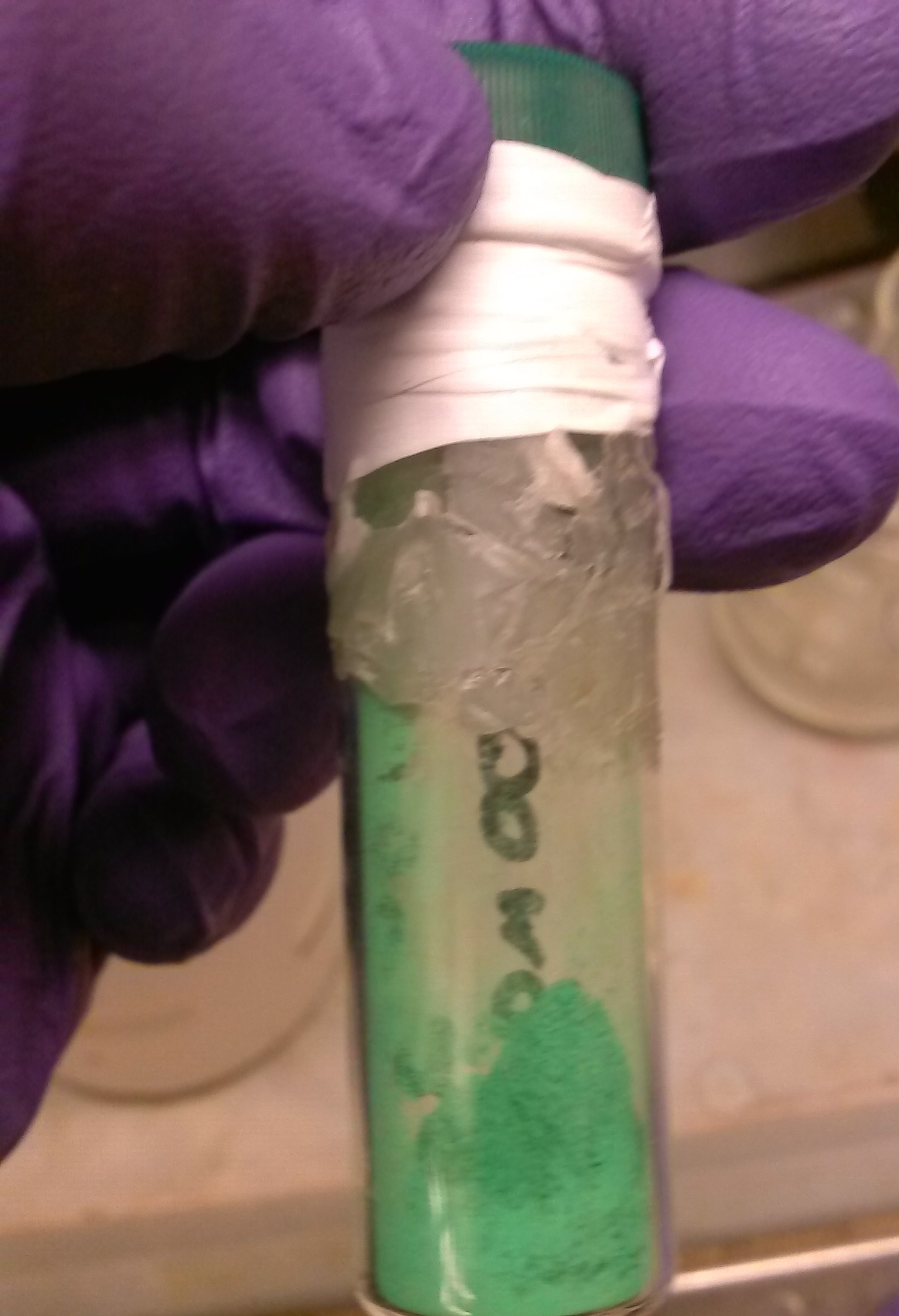
- Anhydrous cobalt(II) bromide in a vial

Identifiers
CAS Number	7789-43-7
3D model (JSmol)	Interactive image
ChemSpider	23012
ECHA InfoCard	100.029.242
EC Number	232-166-7
PubChem CID	24610
RTECS number	GF9595000
UNII	7M7RX75BAL
UN number	3077
CompTox Dashboard (EPA)	DTXSID50894158
- InChI: InChI=1S/2BrH.Co/h2*1H;/q;;+2/p-2 Key: BZRRQSJJPUGBAA-UHFFFAOYSA-L; InChI=1/2BrH.Co/h2*1H;/q;;+2/p-2 Key: BZRRQSJJPUGBAA-NUQVWONBAJ
- SMILES: [Co](Br)Br

Properties
Chemical formula	CoBr_{2}, CoBr_{2}.6H_{2}O, CoBr_{2}.2H_{2}O
Molar mass	218.7412 g/mol (anhydrous); 326.74 g/mol (hexahydrate)
Appearance	Bright green crystals (anhydrous); Red-purple crystals (hexahydrate)
Density	4.909 g/cm^{3} (anhydrous); 2.46 g/cm^{3} (hexahydrate)
Melting point	678 °C (1,252 °F; 951 K) (anhydrous); 47 °C (hexahydrate)
Solubility in water	anhydrous: 66.7 g/100 mL (59 °C); 68.1 g/100 mL (97 °C) hexahydrate: 113.2 g/100 mL (20 °C)
Solubility	77.1 g/100 mL (ethanol, 20 °C); 58.6 g/100 mL (methanol, 30 °C) soluble in methyl acetate, ether, alcohol, acetone
Magnetic susceptibility (χ)	+13000·10^{−6} cm^{3}/mol

Structure
Crystal structure	Rhombohedral, hP3, SpaceGroup = P-3m1, No. 164
Coordination geometry	octahedral

Hazards
- GHS labelling
Pictograms	(GHS07: Exclamation mark) (GHS08: Health hazard) (GHS09: Environmental hazard)
Signal word	Danger
Hazard statements	H302, H312, H315, H317, H319, H332, H334, H335, H350
Precautionary statements	P201, P202, P261, P264, P270, P271, P272, P280, P281, P285, P301+P312, P302+P352, P304+P312, P304+P340, P304+P341, P305+P351+P338, P308+P313, P312, P321, P322, P330, P332+P313, P333+P313, P337+P313, P342+P311, P362, P363, P403+P233, P405, P501
NFPA 704 (fire diamond)	2 0 1
Flash point	Non-flammable
- Lethal dose or concentration (LD, LC)
LD_{50} (median dose)	406 mg/kg (oral, rat)
Safety data sheet (SDS)	Fisher Scientific

Related compounds
Other anions	cobalt(II) fluoride cobalt(II) chloride cobalt(II) iodide
Other cations	iron(II) bromide nickel(II) bromide
- Except where otherwise noted, data are given for materials in their standard state (at 25 °C [77 °F], 100 kPa). verify (what is ?) Infobox references

Cobalt(II) bromide refers to inorganic compounds with the formula CoBr_{2}·(H_{2}O)_{n}. The anhydrous form (n = 0) is a green solid and the hexahydrate (n = 6) is a red solid. These compounds find some use as catalysts.

== Structure ==
The anhydrous compound has a cadmium iodide structure. The tetrahydrate is molecular, with the formula trans-[CoBr_{2}(H_{2}O)_{4}].

== Preparation and reactions ==
Cobalt(II) bromide form by treating an aqueous suspension of cobalt(II) carbonate with hydrobromic acid according to the following idealized equation:

CoCO_{3} + 2 HBr + 5 H_{2}O → CoBr_{2}(H_{2}O)_{6} + CO_{2}

Anhydrous cobalt(II) bromide is hygroscopic. Air exposure eventually forms the hexahydrate in air, which appears as red-purple crystals. The hexahydrate loses four water of crystallization molecules at 100 °C forming the dihydrate:

CoBr_{2}·6H_{2}O → CoBr_{2}·2H_{2}O + 4 H_{2}O

The anhydrous compound forms by heating any of the hydrates to >150 °C in a vacuum:

CoBr_{2}(H_{2}O)_{6} → CoBr_{2} + 6 H_{2}O

The resulting solid can be purified by vacuum sublimation at > 500 °C.

Further heating to 130 °C produces the anhydrous form:

CoBr_{2}·2H_{2}O → CoBr_{2} + 2 H_{2}O

At higher temperatures, cobalt(II) bromide reacts with oxygen, forming cobalt(II,III) oxide and bromine vapor.

The coordination compound bromopentaamminecobalt(III) bromide is prepared by oxidation of an aqueous solution of cobalt(II) bromide and ammonia.

2 CoBr_{2} + 8 NH_{3} + 2 NH_{4}Br + H_{2}O_{2} → 2 [Co(NH_{3})_{5}Br]Br_{2} + 2 H_{2}O

Triphenylphosphine complexes of cobalt(II) bromide have been used as a catalysts in organic synthesis.

== Safety ==
Exposure to large amounts of cobalt(II) can cause cobalt poisoning. Bromide is also mildly toxic.
