= Iron(III) azide =

Names
- Other names: Ferric azide; Iron triazide

Identifiers
| CAS Number | 14215-32-8 |
| 3D model (JSmol) | Interactive image |
| ChemSpider | 57449725 |
| PubChem CID | 57348355 |
| CompTox Dashboard (EPA) | DTXSID00721622 |
- InChI: InChI=1S/Fe.3N3/c;3*1-3-2/q+3;3*-1 Key: MKNZTJIHKCVUHC-UHFFFAOYSA-N
- SMILES: [N-]=[N+]=[N-].[N-]=[N+]=[N-].[N-]=[N+]=[N-].[Fe+3]

Properties
| Chemical formula | Fe(N_{3})_{3} |
| Molar mass | 181.908 g·mol^{−1} |
| Appearance | Dark brown hygroscopic leaflets |
| Melting point | 200 °C (392 °F; 473 K) in air, 230 °C (446 °F; 503 K) in nitrogen Explodes |
| Solubility in water | Soluble |
| Solubility in methanol | Soluble |

Hazards
- GHS labelling
| Pictograms | (GHS01: Explosive) |
| Signal word | Danger |

Related compounds
| Other anions | Iron(II) azide |
| Other cations | Arsenic(III) azide; Boron triazide; Chromium(III) azide |
- Except where otherwise noted, data are given for materials in their standard state (at 25 °C [77 °F], 100 kPa). Infobox references

Iron(III) azide, also called ferric azide, is a chemical compound with the formula Fe(N_{3})_{3}. It is an explosive, very unstable, hygroscopic dark brown solid. This compound is a reagent in organic chemistry. It forms red solutions in water.

== Preparation ==
This compound is prepared by the reaction of sodium azide and iron(III) sulfate in methanol:

6 NaN_{3} + Fe_{2}(SO_{4})_{3} → 2 Fe(N_{3})_{3} + 3 Na_{2}SO_{4}

Iron(III) azide can also be formed by pulse gamma-irradiation of a mixture of iron(II) perchlorate, sodium azide, and hydrogen peroxide. Under these conditions, a neutral N_{3} radical is formed, which oxidizes the iron(II) to iron(III); the iron(III) then promptly combines with azide ions.

== Application in organic chemistry ==
In organic chemistry, ferric azide is a reagent in the one-pot conversion of alkenes to alkyl azide, such as n-butyl azide. The process begins with a hydroboration: an anti-Markovnikov addition of a borane to an alkene. Reaction of the alkylborane with iron(III) azide in the presence of hydrogen peroxide then gives the alkyl azide.
