= Aluminium cyanide =

Identifiers
CAS Number	87993-97-3
3D model (JSmol)	Interactive image
ChemSpider	19984794
PubChem CID	21122287
- InChI: InChI=1S/3CN.Al/c3*1-2;/q3*-1;+3 Key: BIABJQLRIVAXSJ-UHFFFAOYSA-N
- SMILES: [C-]#N.[C-]#N.[C-]#N.[Al+3]

Properties
Chemical formula	C_{3}AlN_{3}
Molar mass	105.036 g·mol^{−1}
Appearance	white solid
Solubility in water	Reacts
- Except where otherwise noted, data are given for materials in their standard state (at 25 °C [77 °F], 100 kPa). Infobox references

Aluminium cyanide is a metallic cyanide with a chemical formula of Al(CN)_{3}. It is a white solid that undergoes hydrolysis to produce aluminium hydroxide and hydrogen cyanide.

== Synthesis and properties ==
Aluminium cyanide was first produced in 1924 as its ammoniate, Al(CN)_{3}·5NH_{3}, by reacting aluminium metal and mercury(II) cyanide in liquid ammonia to prevent hydrolysis.

2 Al + 3 Hg(CN)_{2} → 2 Al(CN)_{3} + 3 Hg

When the ammoniate contacts water, it produces aluminium hydroxide, ammonia, and ammonium cyanide.

The compound was produced in 2001 by the reaction of lithium tetrachloroaluminate and trimethylsilyl cyanide in diethyl ether. Its atoms form a lattice, and X-ray crystallography shows that its crystals form an octahedral Prussian-blue-like structure.

== Uses ==
Aluminium cyanide is used as an intermediate reagent in organic chemical synthesis, transferring cyanide between compounds.
