= Beryllium perchlorate =

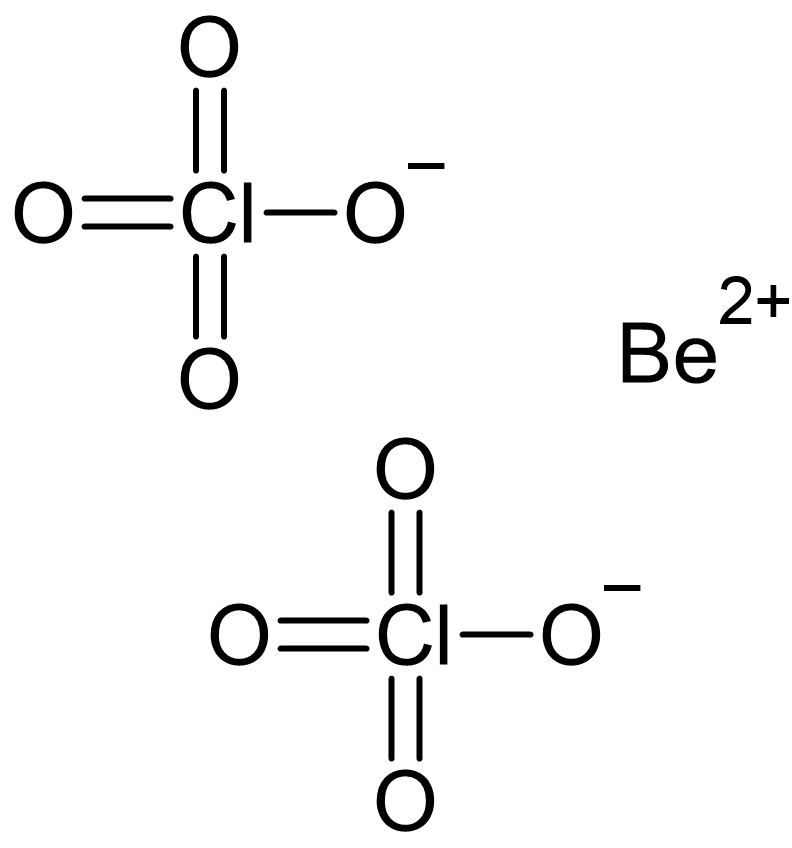

Names
- Other names: Beryllium diperchlorate

Identifiers
CAS Number	13597-95-0; tetrahydrate: 7787-48-6
3D model (JSmol)	Interactive image; tetrahydrate: Interactive image
ChemSpider	25945741
PubChem CID	14389538; tetrahydrate: 53471875
UNII	3A00E42LVD
CompTox Dashboard (EPA)	DTXSID00159608
- InChI: InChI=1S/Be.2ClHO4/c;2*2-1(3,4)5/h;2*(H,2,3,4,5)/q+2;;/p-2 Key: MVTQSBYPNJATTN-UHFFFAOYSA-L; tetrahydrate: InChI=1S/Be.2ClHO4.4H2O/c;2*2-1(3,4)5;;;;/h;2*(H,2,3,4,5);4*1H2/q+2;;;;;;/p-2 Key: TYWIVKBGKVAEHJ-UHFFFAOYSA-L
- SMILES: [Be+2].[O-]Cl(=O)(=O)=O.[O-]Cl(=O)(=O)=O; tetrahydrate: [Be+2].O.O.O.O.[O-]Cl(=O)(=O)=O.[O-]Cl(=O)(=O)=O

Properties
Chemical formula	Be(ClO_{4})_{2}
Molar mass	279.975 g/mol
Appearance	White solid
Melting point	140 °C (284 °F; 413 K) (decomposition, tetrahydrate)
Solubility in water	198 g/100 mL (25 °C, tetrahydrate)
Solubility	Soluble in acetone

Structure
Coordination geometry	Tetrahedral (Be)

Related compounds
Other cations	Magnesium perchlorate Calcium perchlorate
- Except where otherwise noted, data are given for materials in their standard state (at 25 °C [77 °F], 100 kPa). Infobox references

Beryllium perchlorate is an inorganic chemical compound with the formula Be(ClO_{4})_{2}·nH_{2}O, where n is 2 or 4. All forms are white, hygroscopic, and water-soluble solids.

== Synthesis and reactions ==
Beryllium perchlorate tetrahydrate, Be(ClO_{4})_{2}·4H_{2}O, is produced from the reaction of beryllium oxide and concentrated perchloric acid followed by the evaporation of the solution:

BeO + 2 HClO_{4} → Be(ClO_{4})_{2} + H_{2}O

The dihydrate can be similarly prepared by the reaction of beryllium chloride and hydronium perchlorate at 60 °C.

Heating of the tetrahydrate does not produce the anhydrous form; it instead decomposes at 140 °C, producing an unidentified basic beryllium perchlorate, and if this compound is heated to 260 °C, it decomposes to beryllium oxide. Similarly, if the dihydrate is heated to 200 °C, it decomposes to basic beryllium perchlorate (Be_{4}O(ClO_{4})_{6}), which then decomposes at 270 °C to BeO.

The tetrahydrate and dihydrate dissolves in water to form the [Be(H_{2}O)_{4}]^{2+} ion, which then partially hydrolyzes to the trimeric ion [Be_{3}(OH)_{3}(H_{2}O)_{6}]^{3+}. They also dissolve in acetone which then can react with triphenylphosphine oxide to form Be(OPPh_{3})_{4}(ClO_{4})_{2}.

== Structure ==
The structure of the dihydrate, which was probed by IR spectroscopy, consists of discrete [Be(H_{2}O)_{4}]^{2+} and [Be(ClO_{4})_{4}]^{2–} ions.
