= Zinc perchlorate =

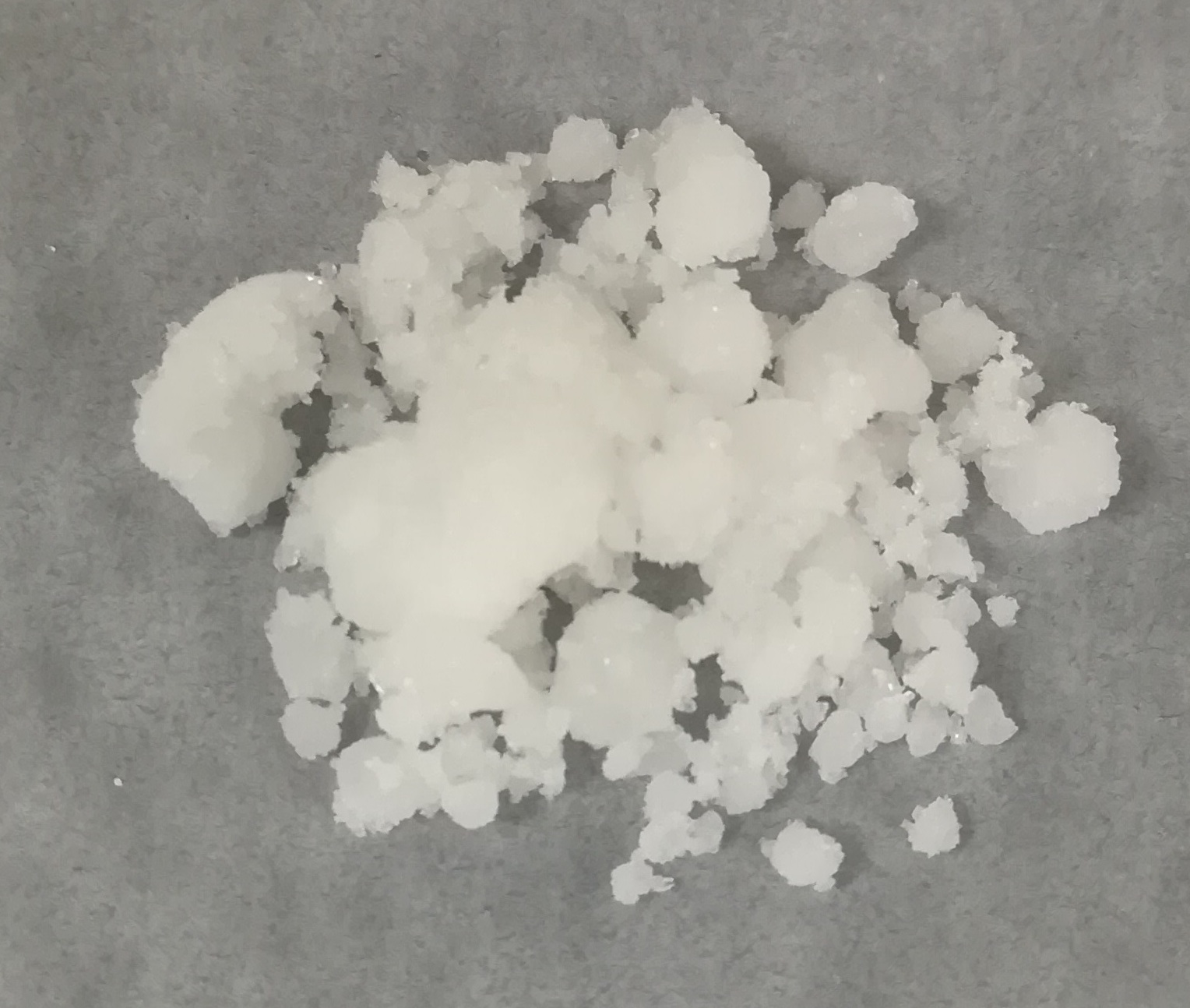
- Zinc perchlorate hexahydrate

Names
- Other names Zinc diperchlorate, zinc(II) perchlorate

Identifiers
CAS Number	13637-61-1
3D model (JSmol)	Interactive image
ChemSpider	8374666
ECHA InfoCard	100.033.733
EC Number	237-122-0
PubChem CID	10199167
UNII	725JL07841
CompTox Dashboard (EPA)	50890711
- InChI: InChI=1S/2ClHO4.Zn/c2*2-1(3,4)5;/h2*(H,2,3,4,5);/q;;+2/p-2 Key: RXBXBWBHKPGHIB-UHFFFAOYSA-L
- SMILES: [O-]Cl(=O)(=O)=O.[O-]Cl(=O)(=O)=O.[Zn+2]

Properties
Chemical formula	Cl_{2}O_{8}Zn
Molar mass	261.826
Appearance	colorless solid
Density	2.252 g/cm^{3}
Melting point	106 °C (223 °F; 379 K)
Boiling point	210 °C (410 °F; 483 K)
Solubility in water	soluble
- Except where otherwise noted, data are given for materials in their standard state (at 25 °C [77 °F], 100 kPa). Infobox references

Zinc perchlorate is the inorganic compound with the chemical formula Zn(ClO_{4})_{2} which forms the hexahydrate.

== Synthesis ==
Zinc perchlorate can be prepared by dissolving zinc oxide or zinc carbonate in perchloric acid:

ZnO + 2 HClO_{4} → Zn(ClO_{4})_{2} + H_{2}O

ZnCO_{3} + 2 HClO_{4} → Zn(ClO_{4})_{2} + H_{2}O + CO_{2}

== Chemical properties ==
The compound decomposes when heated to high temperatures and may explode if heated too strongly.

Like most other perchlorates such as copper perchlorate and lead perchlorate, zinc perchlorate is prone to deliquescence.

Zinc perchlorate can form complexes with ligands such as 8-aminoquinoline, tricarbohydrazide, and tetraphenylethylene tetratriazole.

== Physical properties ==
The compound forms a hexahydrate Zn(ClO_{4})_{2}·6H_{2}O.

Zinc perchlorate forms a hygroscopic colorless solid, odorless, soluble in water and low-weight alcohols.

== Uses ==
Zinc perchlorate is used as an oxidizing agent and catalyst.
