= Beryllium cyanide =

Names
- Other names: Beryllium dicyanide

Identifiers
3D model (JSmol)	Interactive image
PubChem CID	15301188
- InChI: InChI=1S/2CN.Be/c2*1-2;/q2*-1;+2
- SMILES: [Be+2].[C-]#N.[C-]#N

Properties
Chemical formula	Be(CN)_{2}
Molar mass	61.05 g/mol
Appearance	Colorless solid
Density	1.34 g/cm^{3}
Melting point	700 °C (1,292 °F; 973 K) (decomposes)
Solubility in water	Hydrolysis

Structure
Crystal structure	cubic
Space group	Pn3̅m
Lattice constant	a = 5.339 Å
Lattice volume (V)	151.2 Å^{3}
Coordination geometry	tetrahedral (beryllium)

Related compounds
Other cations	Magnesium cyanide
- Except where otherwise noted, data are given for materials in their standard state (at 25 °C [77 °F], 100 kPa). Infobox references

Beryllium cyanide is an inorganic chemical compound with the formula Be(CN)_{2}. It is a toxic white solid which hydrolyses in water. It was first prepared in 1963 by the addition of dimethylberyllium to a solution of hydrogen cyanide in benzene:

(CH_{3})_{2}Be + 2 HCN → Be(CN)_{2} + 2 CH_{4}

A safer modern synthesis has been developed, reacting trimethylsilyl cyanide and beryllium chloride in dibutyl ether. Performing this reaction in liquid ammonia gives the ammoniate, Be(NH_{3})_{4}(CN)_{2}.

Beryllium cyanide reacts with pyridine to form Be(CN)_{2}(py)_{2}.

== Structure ==
Beryllium cyanide adopts a cubic crystal structure, with tetrahedrally coordinated beryllium by four cyanide anions. The tetrahedra are linked at their vertices.
