= Chromium(III) hydroxide =

Chemical compound (Cr(OH)3)

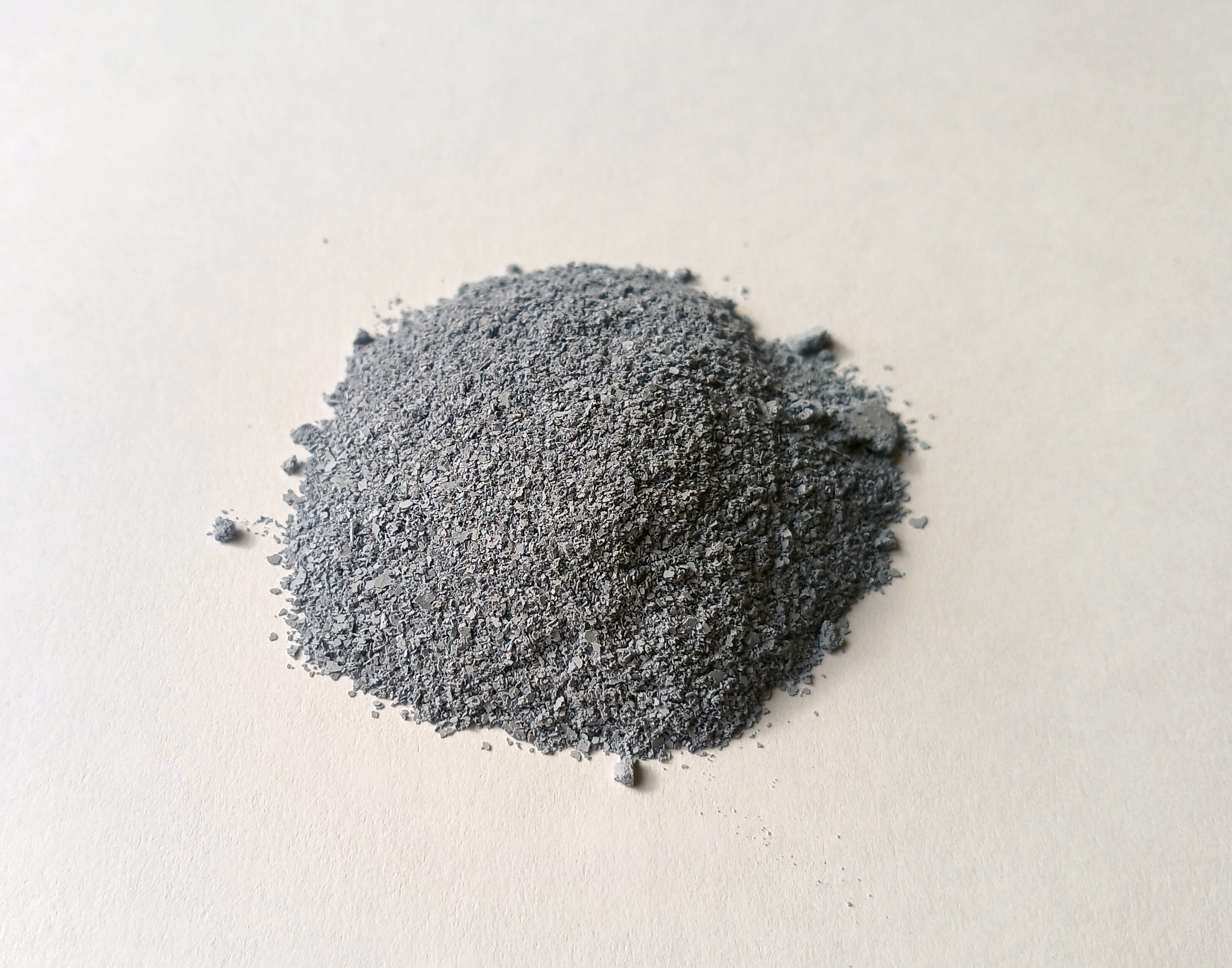

Names
- IUPAC name Chromium(3+) hydroxide

Identifiers
| CAS Number | 1308-14-1 |
| 3D model (JSmol) | ionic form: Interactive image; coordination form: Interactive image |
| ChemSpider | 145861 |
| ECHA InfoCard | 100.013.781 |
| PubChem CID | 166720 |
| RTECS number | GB2670000 |
| UNII | DX3N9U5Q97 |
| CompTox Dashboard (EPA) | DTXSID0051651 |
- InChI: InChI=1S/Cr.3H2O/h;3*1H2 Key: LXMQZGGLHVSEBA-UHFFFAOYSA-N
- SMILES: ionic form: [OH-].[OH-].[OH-].[Cr+++]; coordination form: O[Cr](O)O

Properties
| Chemical formula | Cr(OH)_{3} |
| Molar mass | 103.017 g·mol^{−1} |
| Appearance | green, gelatinous precipitate |
| Density | 3.11 g/cm^{3} |
| Solubility in water | insoluble |

Hazards
- NIOSH (US health exposure limits)
| PEL (Permissible) | TWA 1 mg/m^{3} |
| REL (Recommended) | TWA 0.5 mg/m^{3} |
| IDLH (Immediate danger) | 250 mg/m^{3} |
- Except where otherwise noted, data are given for materials in their standard state (at 25 °C [77 °F], 100 kPa). Infobox references

Chromium(III) hydroxide is a gelatinous green inorganic compound with the chemical formula Cr(OH)_{3}. It is a polymer with an undefined structure and low solubility. It is amphoteric, dissolving in both strong alkalis and strong acids.

== Preparation ==
Chromium(III) hydroxide is prepared by treating an aqueous solution of hydrated chromium trichloride with ammonia.

It can also be prepared by treating an aqueous solution of chromium(III) nitrate with potassium hydroxide until the pH is within 7 to 8: The following idealized equation suffices:

Cr(NO_{3})_{3} + 3 KOH → Cr(OH)_{3} + 3 KNO_{3}

== Use ==
It is used as a pigment, as a mordant, and as a catalyst for organic reactions.

== Natural occurrence ==
Three chromium(III) oxide hydroxide (CrO(OH)) minerals are known: bracewellite, grimaldiite and guyanaite.
