= Gallium(III) cyanide =

Names
- Other names: Gallium tricyanide

Identifiers
3D model (JSmol)	Interactive image
ChemSpider	10004244
PubChem CID	21122422
- InChI: InChI=1S/3CN.Ga/c3*1-2;/q3*-1;+3 Key: LRRAVXULCHBNIH-UHFFFAOYSA-N
- SMILES: [C-]#N.[C-]#N.[C-]#N.[Ga+3]

Properties
Chemical formula	Ga(CN)_{3}
Molar mass	147.78 g/mol
Appearance	White solid
Melting point	450 °C (842 °F; 723 K) (decomposes)
Solubility in water	Reacts
Solubility	Soluble in THF and DMF, insoluble in hexane

Structure
Crystal structure	Cubic
Space group	Pm3̅m
Lattice constant	a = 5.295 Å α = 90°, β = 90°, γ = 90°
- Except where otherwise noted, data are given for materials in their standard state (at 25 °C [77 °F], 100 kPa). Infobox references

Gallium(III) cyanide is a chemical compound of gallium with the formula Ga(CN)_{3}. It is an air-sensitive white solid that decomposes at 450 °C.

== Production and reactions ==
Gallium(III) cyanide is produced by the reaction of gallium(III) chloride and trimethylsilyl cyanide at 75 °C:

3 Me_{3}SiCN + GaCl_{3} → 3 Me_{3}SiCl + Ga(CN)_{3}

The tetracyanogallate(III) ion can be produced by the reaction of Ga(CN)_{3} and LiCN or CuCN. It also forms adducts with pyridine to produce Ga(CN)_{3}(NC_{5}H_{5})_{2}.
