= Lead(II) oxalate =

Identifiers
CAS Number	814-93-7
3D model (JSmol)	Interactive image
ChemSpider	55161
ECHA InfoCard	100.011.284
EC Number	212-413-5
PubChem CID	61218
UNII	642NGP7E5U
UN number	2291
CompTox Dashboard (EPA)	DTXSID70883589
- InChI: InChI=1S/C2H2O4.Pb/c3-1(4)2(5)6;/h(H,3,4)(H,5,6);/q;+2/p-2
- SMILES: C(=O)(C(=O)[O-])[O-].[Pb+2]

Properties
Chemical formula	PbC_{2}O_{4}
Molar mass	295.219
Appearance	White Powder
Density	5.28 g/cm^{3}
Melting point	327.4 °C (621.3 °F; 600.5 K)
Boiling point	1,740 °C (3,160 °F; 2,010 K)
Solubility in water	0.0091 g/100 ml (25 °C)

Thermochemistry
Std molar entropy (S^{⦵}_{298})	146.0216 J
Std enthalpy of formation (Δ_{f}H^{⦵}_{298})	−851.444 kJ/mol

Hazards
- Occupational safety and health (OHS/OSH)
Main hazards	Nephrotoxin, Reproductive Toxin, Neurotoxin, IARC Carcinogen, Birth Defects, Highly Toxic
- GHS labelling
Pictograms	(GHS07: Exclamation mark) (GHS08: Health hazard) (GHS09: Environmental hazard)
Signal word	Danger
Hazard statements	H302, H332, H360, H373, H410
Precautionary statements	P201, P202, P260, P264, P270, P271, P273, P281, P301+P312, P304+P312, P304+P340, P308+P313, P312, P314, P330, P391, P405, P501
- NIOSH (US health exposure limits)
PEL (Permissible)	0.05 mg/m3, as Pb
- Except where otherwise noted, data are given for materials in their standard state (at 25 °C [77 °F], 100 kPa). Infobox references

Lead(II) oxalate is an organic compound with the formula PbC_{2}O_{4}. It is naturally found as a heavy white solid.

== Preparation ==
This compound is commercially available. It may be prepared by the metathesis reaction between lead(II) nitrate and sodium oxalate:

Pb^{2+}(aq) + C_{2}O_{4}^{2−} → PbC_{2}O_{4} (s)

A dihydrate may be formed with water solutions. But the dihydrate dehydrates in air:

(PbC_{2}O_{4}•2H_{2}O (s) → (PbC_{2}O_{4} (s) + 2H_{2}O (g)

The trihydrate (PbC_{2}O_{4}•3H_{2}O) can be made by reacting a solution of lead(II) carbonate in perchloric acid with oxalylhydroxamic acid.

== Properties ==
As well as an anhydrous form, a monohydrate (PbC_{2}O_{4}•H_{2}O), a dihydrate (PbC_{2}O_{4}•2H_{2}O) and a trihydrate (PbC_{2}O_{4}•3H_{2}O) are known. The dihydrate is from the orthorhombic crystal system, with space group Pnam (number 62), with unit cell dimensions: a = 9.053 Å b = 8.036 Å and c = 7.834 Å. The unit cell volume is 569.8 Å^{3} with four formula per cell, giving a density of 3.860 g/cm^{3}

The trihydrate has triclinic crystals with space group P1̅ and unit cell dimensions and angles: a = 6.008 Å, b=6.671 Å, c=8.493 Å, α=74.70°, β=74.33°, and γ=80.98°. The unit cell volume is 314.41 Å^{3} with two formula per unit cell. Density is 3.69 g/cm^{3}.

== Solubility ==
Lead(II) oxalate is insoluble in water. Its solubility is increased in presence of excess oxalate anions, due to the formation of the Pb(C_{2}O_{4})_{2}^{2−} complex ion.
