= Cobalt(II) iodide =

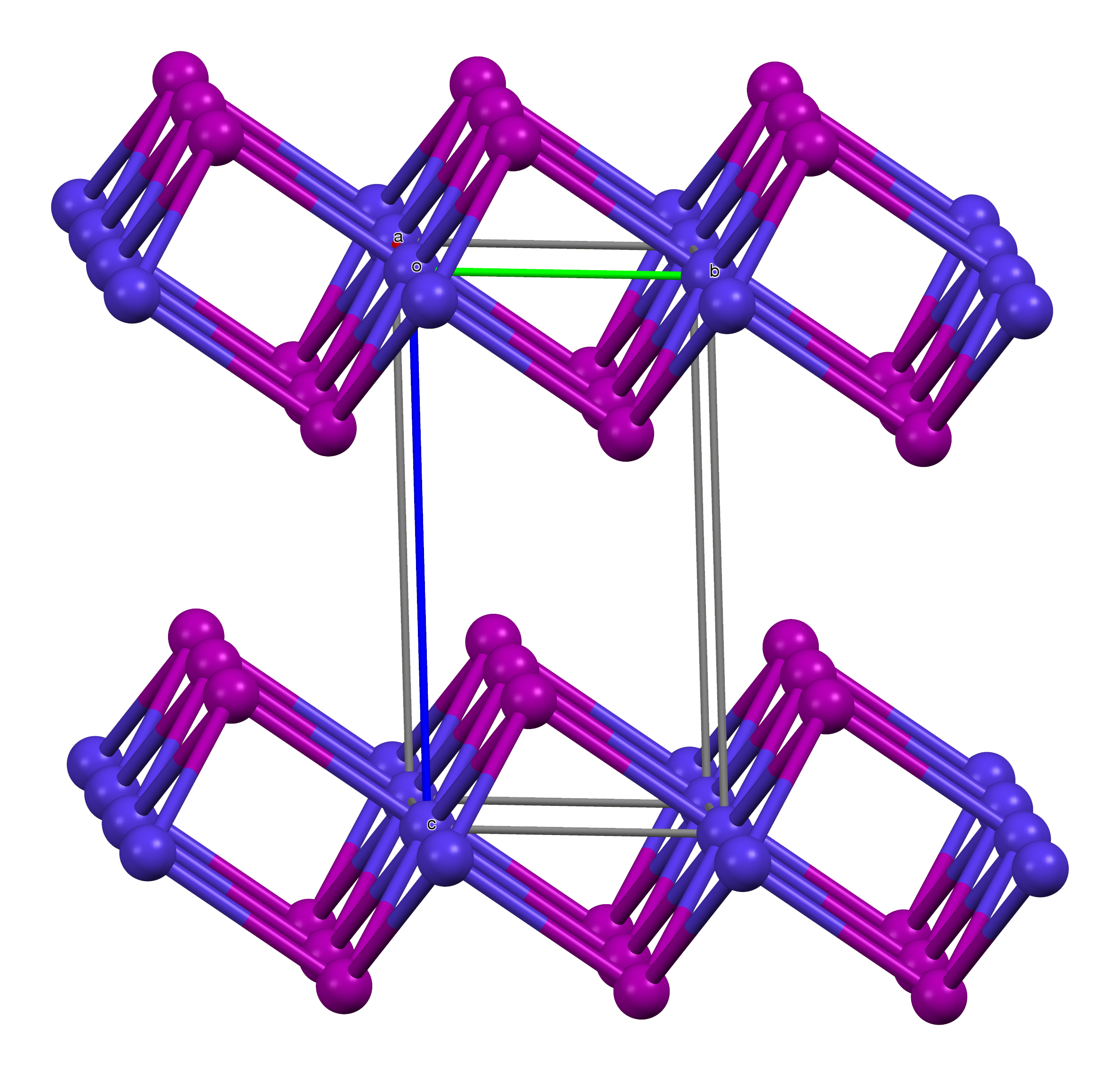

Names
- IUPAC name Cobalt(II) iodide
- Other names cobaltous iodide, cobalt diiodide

Identifiers
CAS Number	15238-00-3 (HCl); 52595-03-6 (hexahydrate)
3D model (JSmol)	Interactive image
ChemSpider	76542
ECHA InfoCard	100.035.697
EC Number	239-283-2
PubChem CID	419951
UNII	RTJ1W9DF34
CompTox Dashboard (EPA)	DTXSID301014304 DTXSID00329389, DTXSID301014304
- InChI: InChI=1S/Co.2HI/h;2*1H/q+2;;/p-2 Key: AVWLPUQJODERGA-UHFFFAOYSA-L; InChI=1/Co.2HI/h;2*1H/q+2;;/p-2 Key: AVWLPUQJODERGA-NUQVWONBAD
- SMILES: [Co+2].[I-].[I-]

Properties
Chemical formula	CoI_{2}
Molar mass	312.7421 g/mol (anhydrous); 420.83 g/mol (hexahydrate)
Appearance	α-form: black hexagonal crystal β-form: yellow powder
Density	α-form: 5.584 g/cm^{3} β-form: 5.45 g/cm^{3} hexahydrate: 2.79 g/cm^{3}
Melting point	α-form: 515-520 °C under vacuum β-form: converts to α-form at 400 °C
Boiling point	570 °C (1,058 °F; 843 K)
Solubility in water	67.0 g/100 mL
Magnetic susceptibility (χ)	+10,760·10^{−6} cm^{3}/mol

Hazards
- GHS labelling
Pictograms	(GHS07: Exclamation mark) (GHS08: Health hazard)
Signal word	Warning
Hazard statements	H302, H312, H315, H319, H332, H335
NFPA 704 (fire diamond)	3 0 1

Related compounds
Other anions	Cobalt(II) fluoride Cobalt(II) chloride Cobalt(II) bromide
Other cations	Nickel(II) iodide Copper(I) iodide
- Except where otherwise noted, data are given for materials in their standard state (at 25 °C [77 °F], 100 kPa). verify (what is ?) Infobox references

Cobalt(II) iodide or cobaltous iodide are the inorganic compounds with the formula CoI_{2} and the hexahydrate CoI_{2}(H_{2}O)_{6}. These salts are the principal iodides of cobalt.

== Structure ==
Cobalt(II) iodide crystallizes in two polymorphs, the α- and β-forms. The α-polymorph consists of black hexagonal crystals, which turn dark green when exposed to air. Under a vacuum at 500 °C, samples of α-CoI_{2} sublime, yielding the β-polymorph as a yellow crystals. β-CoI_{2} also readily absorbs moisture from the air, converting into green hydrate. At 400 °C, β-CoI_{2} reverts to the α-form. The anhydrous salts adopt the cadmium halide structures.

The hexaaquo salt consists of separated [Co(H_{2}O)_{6}]^{2+} and iodide ions as verified crystallographically.

== Synthesis ==
Cobalt(II) iodide is prepared by treating cobalt powder with gaseous hydrogen iodide The hydrated form CoI_{2}.6H_{2}O can be prepared by the reaction of cobalt(II) oxide (or related cobalt compounds) with hydroiodic acid.

== Reactions and applications ==
Anhydrous cobalt(II) iodide is sometimes used to test for the presence of water in various solvents.

Cobalt(II) iodide is used as a catalyst, e.g. in carbonylations. It catalyzes the reaction of diketene with Grignard reagents, useful for the synthesis of terpenoids
