= Bromopentaamminecobalt(III) bromide =

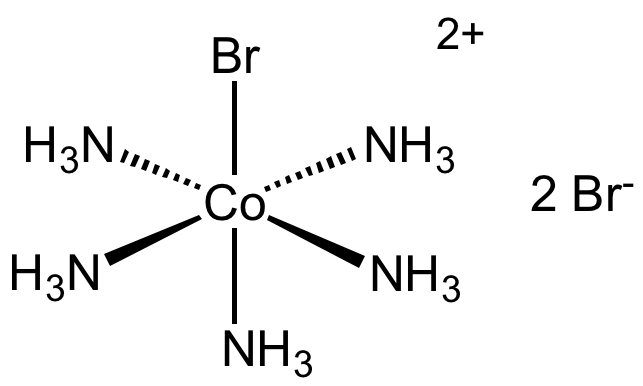

Identifiers
CAS Number	14283-12-6
3D model (JSmol)	Interactive image
PubChem CID	165365629
- InChI: InChI=1S/3BrH.Co.5H3N/h3*1H;;5*1H3/q;;;+3;;;;;/p-3 Key: BFKCTJBABHCHCZ-UHFFFAOYSA-K
- SMILES: [Co+3].[Br-].[Br-].[Br-].N.N.N.N.N

Properties
Chemical formula	[Co(NH_{3})_{5}Br]Br_{2}
Molar mass	383.798 g/mol
Appearance	Purple
- Except where otherwise noted, data are given for materials in their standard state (at 25 °C [77 °F], 100 kPa). Infobox references

Bromopentaamminecobalt(III) bromide is the dibromide salt of the cobalt coordination compound with the formula [Co(NH_{3})_{5}Br]^{2+}. It is a purple, water-soluble solid. The analogous chloropentaamminecobalt(III) chloride is also well known.

== Synthesis and reactions ==
The title compound is prepared by oxidation of a solution of cobalt(II) salts in aqueous ammonia.

2 CoBr_{2} + 8 NH_{3} + 2 NH_{4}Br + H_{2}O_{2} → 2 [Co(NH_{3})_{5}Br]Br_{2} + 2 H_{2}O

It was first reported in the 1870s, before the structure or even formulae were understood for such complexes. This early work showed that only two thirds of the bromide groups were exchangeable with other anions such as nitrate and dithionate.

The complex undergoes aquation, meaning that bromide is displaced by water:

[Co(NH_{3})_{5}Br]Br_{2} + H_{2}O → [Co(NH_{3})_{5}(H_{2}O)]Br_{3}

This process is catalyzed by platinum.
