= Chromium azide =

Names
- IUPAC name Chromium(III) triazide
- Other names: Chromium(III) azide; Chromium triazide

Identifiers
CAS Number	15557-22-9
3D model (JSmol)	Interactive image
ChemSpider	25935365
PubChem CID	129686002
- InChI: InChI=1S/Cr.3N3/c;3*1-3-2/q+3;3*-1 Key: QTGXYCYBAVYYCM-UHFFFAOYSA-N
- SMILES: [N-]=[N+]=[N-].[N-]=[N+]=[N-].[N-]=[N+]=[N-].[Cr+3]

Properties
Chemical formula	Cr(N_{3})_{3}
Molar mass	178.06 g/mol
- Except where otherwise noted, data are given for materials in their standard state (at 25 °C [77 °F], 100 kPa). Infobox references

Chromium azide is an inorganic chemical compound with the formula Cr(N_{3})_{3}.

== Properties ==
Chromium azide formation has been investigated from chromium salts and sodium azide. It was separated in 1922 through the evaporation of a dry crystalline chromium(III) nitrate solution in absolute alcohol with sodium azide. Through a spectrophotometric study, it was shown that the chromium(III) nitrate solution's green color was due to the mono-azido-chromium(III) complex. Two absorbency maxima were located at 442 and 605 nm. Chromium azide has luminescence properties from its optically active Cr^{3+} ions.
