= Cadmium phosphate =

Chemical compound

Names
- IUPAC name Cadmium phosphate

Identifiers
CAS Number	13477-17-3
3D model (JSmol)	Interactive image
ChemSpider	24274
ECHA InfoCard	100.033.408
EC Number	236-764-9
PubChem CID	26060
CompTox Dashboard (EPA)	DTXSID60889611
- InChI: InChI=1S/3Cd.2H3O4P/c;;;2*1-5(2,3)4/h;;;2*(H3,1,2,3,4)/q3*+2;;/p-6 Key: NRGIRRZWCDKDMV-UHFFFAOYSA-H
- SMILES: [O-]P(=O)([O-])[O-].[O-]P(=O)([O-])[O-].[Cd+2].[Cd+2].[Cd+2]

Properties
Chemical formula	Cd_{3}(PO_{4})_{2}
Molar mass	527.18 g/mol
Appearance	White solid
Density	5.17 g/cm^{3}
Melting point	1,500 °C (2,730 °F; 1,770 K)
Solubility in water	Insoluble
Solubility product (K_{sp})	2.53 × 10^{–33}

Hazards
- GHS labelling
Pictograms	(GHS07: Exclamation mark) (GHS08: Health hazard)
Signal word	Danger
- Except where otherwise noted, data are given for materials in their standard state (at 25 °C [77 °F], 100 kPa). Infobox references

Cadmium phosphate is an inorganic phosphate salt of cadmium, with the molecular formula Cd_{3}(PO_{4})_{2}. It is a white, water-insoluble solid.

== Synthesis ==
Tricadmium phosphate can be prepared by the reaction of cadmium chloride with diammonium phosphate at 800 °C:

3 CdCl_{2} + 2 (NH_{4})_{2}HPO_{4} → Cd_{3}(PO_{4})_{2} + 4 NH_{4}Cl + 2 HCl

The precipitation of aqueous cadmium ions with soluble phosphate sources, such as trisodium phosphate and phosphoric acid, does not produce Cd_{3}(PO_{4})_{2}, but instead produces a hydrate of cadmium with the formula Cd_{5}H_{2}(PO_{4})_{4}·4H_{2}O. When this compound is heated, it yields a mixture of cadmium phosphate and cadmium pyrophosphate, Cd_{2}P_{2}O_{7}.

== Uses ==
Cadmium phosphate can be used as a fertilizer to provide phosphorus to crops for their growth.

== See also ==
- Cadmium phosphide
