= Cobalt(II) azide =

Names
- IUPAC name Cobalt(II) diazide
- Other names Cobalt diazide

Identifiers
| CAS Number | 14215-31-7 |
| 3D model (JSmol) | Interactive image |
| ChemSpider | 3470740 |
| PubChem CID | 50912166 |
- InChI: InChI=1S/Co.2N3/c;2*1-3-2/q+2;2*-1 Key: XRKZTILYATXYGV-UHFFFAOYSA-N
- SMILES: [N-]=[N+]=[N-].[N-]=[N+]=[N-].[Co+2]

Properties
| Chemical formula | CoN_{6} |
| Molar mass | 142.975 g·mol^{−1} |

Hazards
- GHS labelling
| Pictograms | (GHS01: Explosive) |
| Signal word | Danger |
- Except where otherwise noted, data are given for materials in their standard state (at 25 °C [77 °F], 100 kPa). Infobox references

Cobalt(II) azide is an inorganic chemical compound with the formula Co(N_{3})_{2}. It can be formed through the reaction between dicobalt octacarbonyl and iodine azide.

Co_{2}(CO)_{8} + 4IN_{3} → 2Co(N_{3})_{2} + 8CO + 2I_{2}

== Properties ==
Aqueous solutions of cobalt(II) azide change in color when introduced to suitable organic solvents, from pink-violet to a blue shade. Like most azides, it is explosive.
