= Nickel azide =

Names
- IUPAC name Nickel(II) diazide
- Other names Nickel diazide

Identifiers
CAS Number	59865-91-7
3D model (JSmol)	Interactive image
ChemSpider	24772355
PubChem CID	129630068
- InChI: InChI=1S/2N3.Ni/c2*1-3-2;/q2*-1;+2 Key: JRUBGUVYQMKOMK-UHFFFAOYSA-N
- SMILES: [N-]=[N+]=[N-].[N-]=[N+]=[N-].[Ni+2]

Properties
Chemical formula	Ni(N_{3})_{2}
Molar mass	142.73 g/mol

Hazards
- GHS labelling
Pictograms	(GHS01: Explosive)
Signal word	Danger
- Except where otherwise noted, data are given for materials in their standard state (at 25 °C [77 °F], 100 kPa). Infobox references

Nickel azide is an inorganic chemical compound with the formula Ni(N_{3})_{2}. It can be formed through the reaction between nickel tetracarbonyl and iodine azide.

2Ni(CO)_{4} + 2IN_{3} → Ni(N_{3})_{2} + NiI_{2} + 8CO

== Properties ==
Nickel azide water solution has high absorbance in the ultraviolet with a peak at 292 nm. The solution also contains hexaaquanickel cations with visible light absorption peaks at 394, 656, and 720 nm. A related mixed anion compound with nicotinic acid and nicotinate exhibits EO bridging coordination (μ-1,1) on the azide, and possesses an unusual angle between the nickel and nitrogen present within the complex. Like most azides, it is explosive.
