= Nickel(II) fluoride =

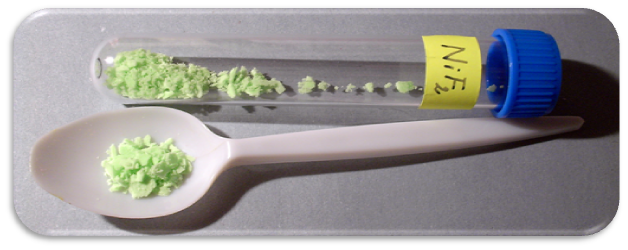

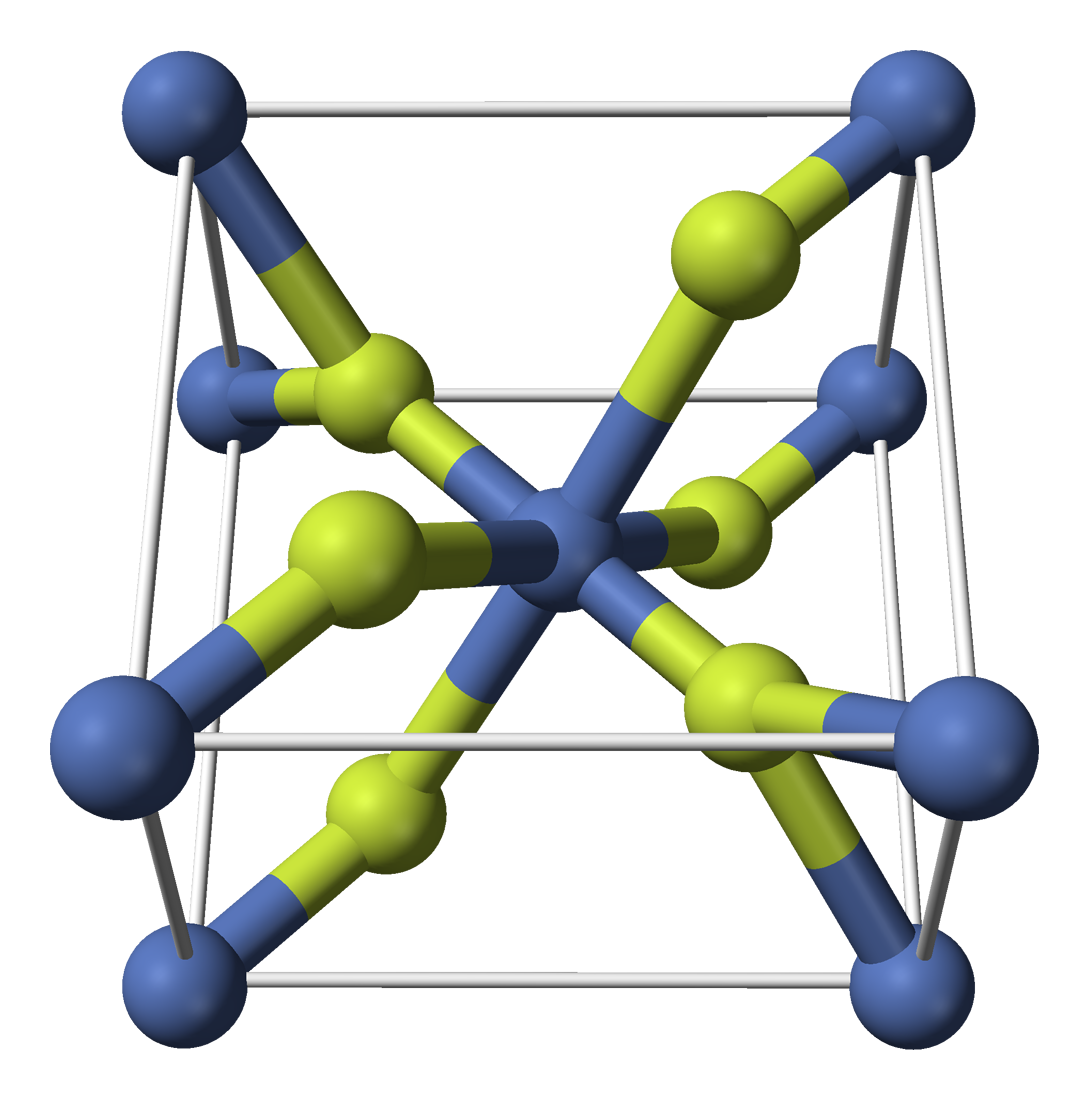
- Nickel, Ni; Fluorine, F

Names
- IUPAC name Nickel(II) fluoride

Identifiers
CAS Number	10028-18-9
3D model (JSmol)	Interactive image
ChemSpider	23210
ECHA InfoCard	100.030.053
EC Number	233-071-3
PubChem CID	24825
RTECS number	QR6825000
UNII	69NBB20493
CompTox Dashboard (EPA)	DTXSID5064912
- InChI: InChI=1S/2FH.Ni/h2*1H;/q;;+2/p-2 Key: DBJLJFTWODWSOF-UHFFFAOYSA-L; InChI=1S/2FH.Ni/h2*1H;/q;;+2/p-2 Key: DBJLJFTWODWSOF-NUQVWONBAA; Key: DBJLJFTWODWSOF-UHFFFAOYSA-L
- SMILES: F[Ni]F

Properties
Chemical formula	NiF_{2}
Molar mass	96.6902 g/mol
Appearance	Yellowish to green tetragonal crystals
Density	4.72 g/cm^{3}
Melting point	1,474 °C (2,685 °F; 1,747 K)
Solubility in water	4 g/100 mL
Solubility	insoluble in alcohol, ether
Magnetic susceptibility (χ)	+2410.0·10^{−6} cm^{3}/mol

Structure
Crystal structure	Rutile
Coordination geometry	Nickel: Octahedral; Oxygen: Trigonal planar

Hazards
- GHS labelling
Pictograms	(GHS08: Health hazard) (GHS09: Environmental hazard)
Signal word	Danger
Hazard statements	H317, H334, H341, H350i, H360D, H372, H410
Precautionary statements	P203, P233, P260, P264, P270, P271, P272, P273, P280, P284, P302+P352, P304+P340, P318, P319, P321, P333+P317, P342+P316, P362+P364, P391, P403, P405, P501

Related compounds
Other anions	Nickel(II) chloride Nickel(II) bromide Nickel(II) iodide
Other cations	Cobalt(II) fluoride Copper(II) fluoride
- Except where otherwise noted, data are given for materials in their standard state (at 25 °C [77 °F], 100 kPa). verify (what is ?) Infobox references

Nickel(II) fluoride is the chemical compound with the formula NiF_{2}. It is an ionic compound of nickel and fluorine and forms yellowish to green tetragonal crystals. Unlike many fluorides, NiF_{2} is stable in air.

Nickel(II) fluoride is also produced when nickel metal is exposed to fluorine. In fact, NiF_{2} comprises the passivating surface that forms on nickel alloys (e.g. monel) in the presence of hydrogen fluoride or elemental fluorine. For this reason, nickel and its alloys are suitable materials for storage and transport these fluorine and related fluorinating agents. NiF_{2} is also used as a catalyst for the synthesis of chlorine pentafluoride.

== Preparation and structure ==
NiF_{2} is prepared by treatment of anhydrous nickel(II) chloride with fluorine at 350 °C:

NiCl_{2} + F_{2} → NiF_{2} + Cl_{2}

The corresponding reaction of cobalt(II) chloride results in oxidation of the cobalt, whereas nickel remains in the +2 oxidation state after fluorination because its +3 oxidation state is less stable. Chloride is more easily oxidized than nickel(II). This is a typical halogen displacement reaction, where a halogen plus a less active halide makes the less active halogen and the more active halide.

Like some other metal difluorides, NiF_{2} crystallizes in the rutile structure, which features octahedral Ni centers and planar fluorides. At low temperatures, its magnetic structure is antiferromagnetic.

== Reactions ==
A melt of NiF_{2} and KF reacts to give successively potassium trifluoronickelate and potassium tetrafluoronickelate:

NiF_{2} + KF → K[NiF_{3}]
K[NiF_{3}] + KF → K_{2}[NiF_{4}]

The structure of this material is closely related to some superconducting oxide materials.

Nickel(II) fluoride reacts with strong bases to give nickel(II) hydroxide:

NiF_{2} + 2 NaOH → Ni(OH)_{2} + 2 NaF
