= Cadmium oxalate =

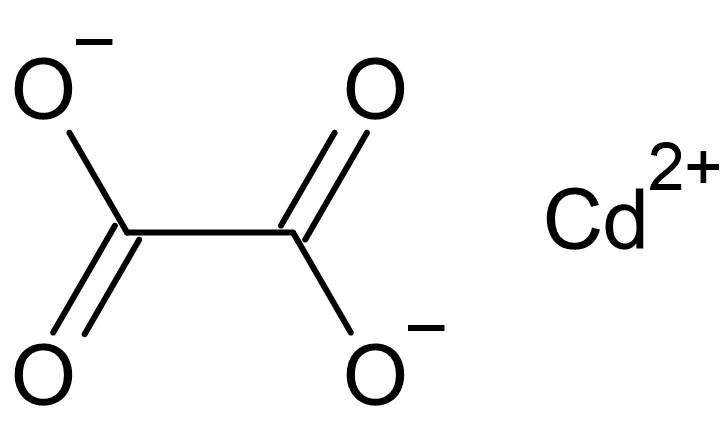

Identifiers
CAS Number	814-88-0
3D model (JSmol)	Interactive image
ChemSpider	11409843
EC Number	212-408-8
PubChem CID	3083647
CompTox Dashboard (EPA)	DTXSID30231082
- InChI: InChI=1S/C2H2O4.Cd/c3-1(4)2(5)6;/h(H,3,4)(H,5,6); Key: OPPBPDNPEOPGLG-UHFFFAOYSA-N
- SMILES: C(=O)(C(=O)O)O.[Cd]

Properties
Chemical formula	C_{2}CdO_{4}
Molar mass	200.432 g·mol^{−1}
Density	3.32 g·cm^{−3} (anhydrous)
Melting point	340 °C (613 K) (decomposes, anhydrous); 180 °C (453 K) (decomposes, dihydrate)
Solubility in water	0.003 g (18 °C, trihydrate)
- Except where otherwise noted, data are given for materials in their standard state (at 25 °C [77 °F], 100 kPa). Infobox references

Cadmium oxalate is an inorganic compound with the chemical formula CdC_{2}O_{4}. It can be produced by reacting potassium oxalate and cadmium nitrate. Its thermal decomposition in air produces cadmium oxide, while metallic cadmium will be formed instead under vacuum. It reacts with chalcogens in ethylenediamine to form the corresponding cadmium chalcogenide:

CdC_{2}O_{4} + E → CdE + 2 CO_{2}↑ (E = S, Se, Te)
