= Copper(II) perchlorate =

- Copper(II) perchlorate hexahydrate

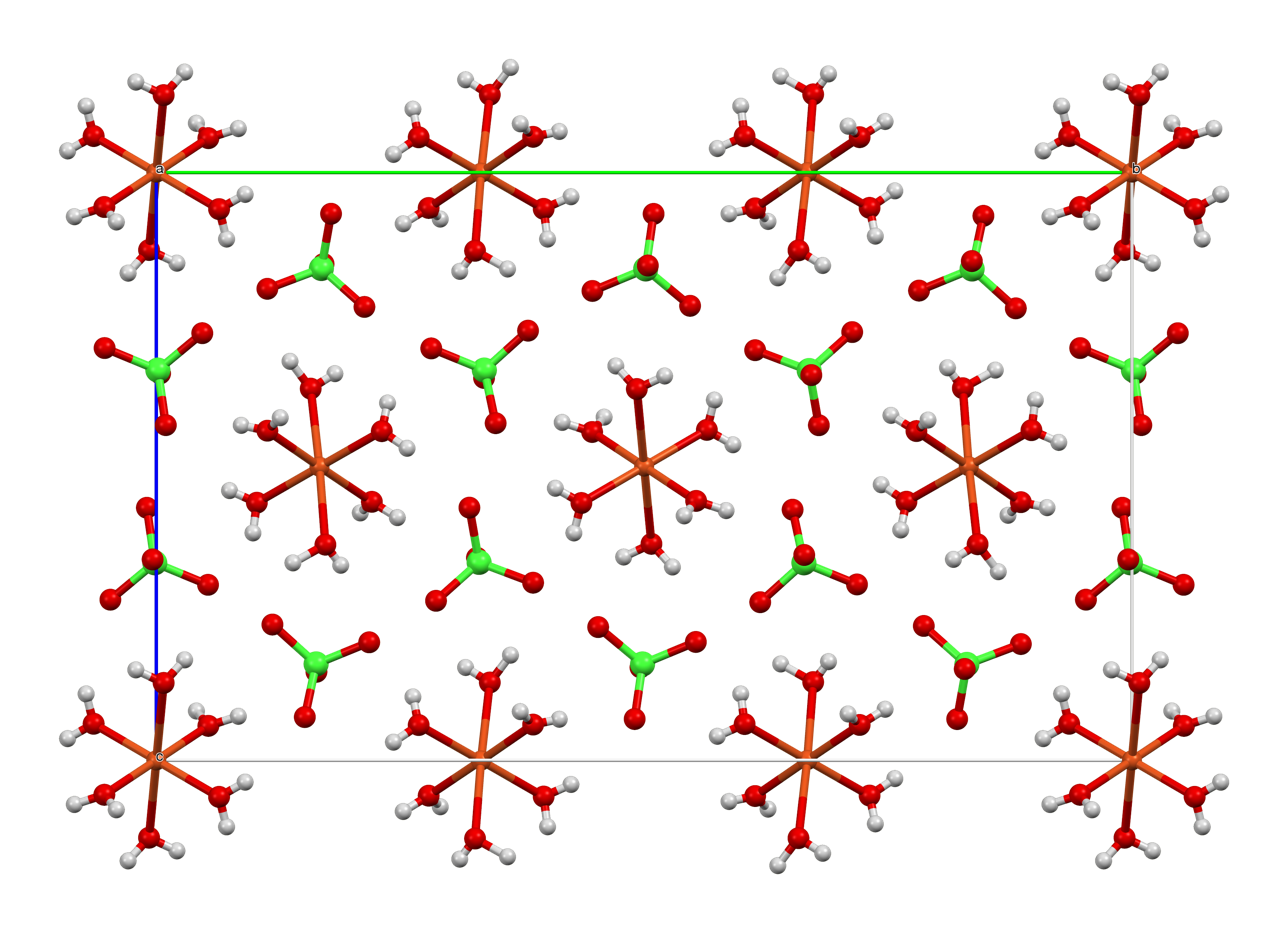
- Copper(II) perchlorate hexahydrate

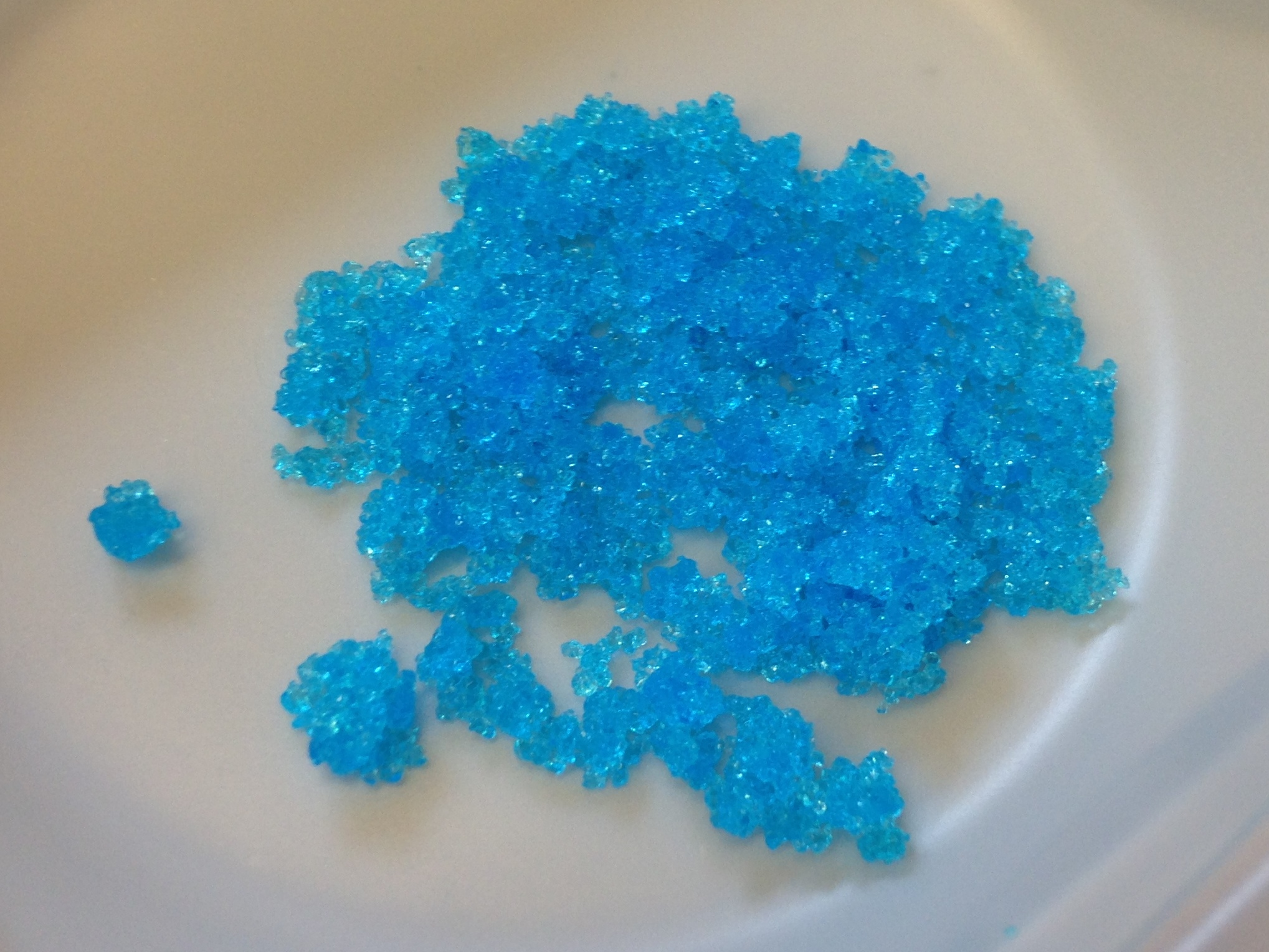
- Copper(II) perchlorate hexahydrate

Names
- IUPAC name Copper(II) perchlorate
- Other names Cupric perchlorate

Identifiers
CAS Number	10294-46-9 (hexahydrate)
3D model (JSmol)	Interactive image
ChemSpider	26246
ECHA InfoCard	100.033.978
EC Number	237-391-4
PubChem CID	28211 (hexahydrate)
UNII	57JSH2LO1G
CompTox Dashboard (EPA)	DTXSID40890720
- InChI: InChI=1S/2ClHO4.Cu/c2*2-1(3,4)5;/h2*(H,2,3,4,5);/q;;+2/p-2 Key: YRNNKGFMTBWUGL-UHFFFAOYSA-L
- SMILES: [O-]Cl(=O)(=O)=O.[O-]Cl(=O)(=O)=O.[Cu+2]

Properties
Chemical formula	Cu(ClO_{4})_{2} (anhydrous)
Molar mass	262.447 g/mol (anhydrous); 370.539 g/mol (hexahydrate)
Appearance	Blue crystalline hygroscopic solid (hexahydrate)
Odor	odorless
Density	2.225 g/cm^{3} (hexahydrate)
Melting point	82 °C (180 °F; 355 K) (hexahydrate)
Boiling point	120 °C (248 °F; 393 K) (hexahydrate)
Solubility in water	146 g/(100 ml) (30 °C)
Refractive index (n_{D})	1.505 (hexahydrate)

Hazards
- GHS labelling
Pictograms	(GHS03: Oxidizing) (GHS07: Exclamation mark)
Signal word	Warning
Hazard statements	H272, H315, H319, H335
Precautionary statements	P210, P220, P221, P261, P264, P271, P280, P302+P352, P304+P340, P305+P351+P338, P312, P321, P332+P313, P337+P313, P362, P370+P378, P403+P233, P405, P501
- NIOSH (US health exposure limits)
PEL (Permissible)	TWA 1 mg/m^{3} (as Cu)
REL (Recommended)	TWA 1 mg/m^{3} (as Cu)
IDLH (Immediate danger)	TWA 100 mg/m^{3} (as Cu)
Safety data sheet (SDS)	External MSDS
- Except where otherwise noted, data are given for materials in their standard state (at 25 °C [77 °F], 100 kPa). verify (what is ?) Infobox references

Copper(II) perchlorate is an inorganic compound with the chemical formula Cu(ClO_{4})_{2}. It forms hydrates with the formula Cu(ClO_{4})_{2}(H_{2}O)_{x}. The anhydrous solid is rarely encountered but several hydrates are known. Most important is the perchlorate salt of the copper aquo complex copper(II) perchlorate hexahydrate, [Cu(H_{2}O)_{6}]^{2+}(ClO_{4}^{−})_{2}.

Infrared spectroscopic studies of anhydrous copper(II) perchlorate provided some of the first evidence for the binding of perchlorate anion to a metal ion. The structure of this compound was eventually deduced by X-ray crystallography. Copper resides in a distorted octahedral environment and the perchlorate ligands bridge between the Cu(II) centers.
