= Zinc cyanide =

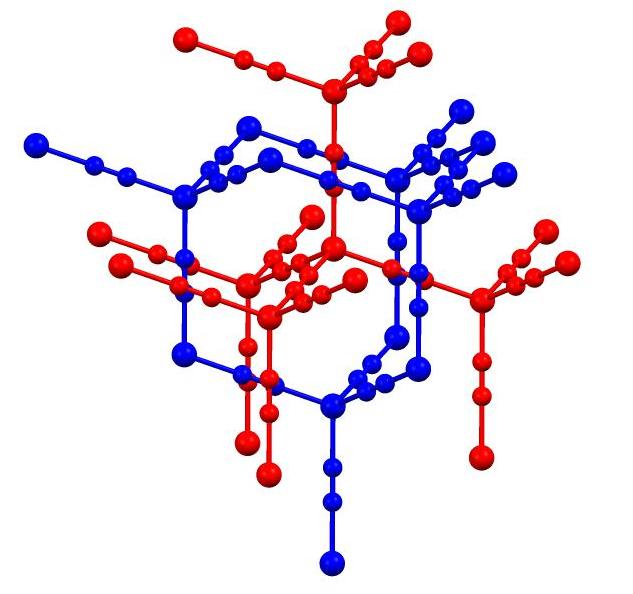
- Zinc cyanide

Names
- Other names Neutral zinc cyanide (1:2)

Identifiers
CAS Number	557-21-1
3D model (JSmol)	Interactive image
ChemSpider	10713
ECHA InfoCard	100.008.331
EC Number	209-162-9
PubChem CID	11186
RTECS number	ZH1575000
UNII	04392RL5SR
UN number	1713
CompTox Dashboard (EPA)	DTXSID6024385
- InChI: InChI=1S/2CN.Zn/c2*1-2;/q2*-1;+2 Key: GTLDTDOJJJZVBW-UHFFFAOYSA-N; InChI=1/2CN.Zn/c2*1-2;/q2*-1;+2 Key: GTLDTDOJJJZVBW-UHFFFAOYAM
- SMILES: [Zn+2].[C-]#N.[C-]#N

Properties
Chemical formula	Zn(CN)_{2}
Molar mass	117.444 g/mol
Appearance	white solid
Density	1.852 g/cm^{3}, solid
Melting point	800 °C (1,470 °F; 1,070 K) (decomposes)
Solubility in water	0.0005 g/100 mL (20 °C)
Solubility	attacked by alkalies, KCN, ammonia
Magnetic susceptibility (χ)	−46.0·10^{−6} cm^{3}/mol

Hazards
- Occupational safety and health (OHS/OSH)
Main hazards	Toxic, releases cyanide-ion in body
- GHS labelling
Pictograms	(GHS06: Toxic) (GHS09: Environmental hazard)
Signal word	Danger
Hazard statements	H300, H301, H310, H330, H410
Precautionary statements	P260, P262, P264, P270, P271, P273, P280, P284, P301+P310, P302+P350, P304+P340, P310, P320, P330, P361, P363, P391, P403+P233, P405, P501
NFPA 704 (fire diamond)	4 0 0
- Lethal dose or concentration (LD, LC)
LD_{50} (median dose)	100 mg/kg, rat (intraperitoneal)
- Except where otherwise noted, data are given for materials in their standard state (at 25 °C [77 °F], 100 kPa). verify (what is ?) Infobox references

Zinc cyanide is the inorganic compound with the formula Zn(CN)_{2}. It is a white solid that is used mainly for electroplating zinc but also has more specialized applications for the synthesis of organic compounds.

== Structure ==
In Zn(CN)_{2}, zinc adopts the tetrahedral coordination environment, all linked by bridging cyanide ligands. The structure consists of two "interpenetrating" structures (blue and red in the picture above). Such motifs are sometimes called "expanded diamondoid" structures. Some forms of SiO_{2} adopt a similar structure, wherein the tetrahedral Si centres are linked by oxides. The cyanide group shows head to tail disorder with any zinc atom having between one and four carbon neighbours, and the remaining being nitrogen atoms. It shows one of the largest negative coefficients of thermal expansion (exceeding the previous record holder, zirconium tungstate).

== Chemical properties ==
Typical for an inorganic polymer, Zn(CN)_{2} is insoluble in most solvents. The solid dissolves in, or more precisely, is degraded by, aqueous solutions of basic ligands such as hydroxide, ammonia, and additional cyanide to give anionic complexes.

== Synthesis ==
Zn(CN)_{2} is easy to make by combining aqueous solutions of cyanide and zinc ions, for example via the double replacement reaction between KCN and ZnSO_{4}:

ZnSO_{4} + 2 KCN → Zn(CN)_{2} + K_{2}SO_{4}

For commercial applications, some effort is made to avoid halide impurities by using acetate salts of zinc:

Zn(CH_{3}COO)_{2} + HCN → Zn(CN)_{2} + 2 CH_{3}COOH

Zinc cyanide is also produced as a byproduct of certain gold extraction methods. Procedures to isolate gold from aqueous gold cyanide sometimes call for the addition of zinc:

2 [Au(CN)_{2}]^{−} + Zn → 2 Au + Zn(CN)_{2} + 2 CN^{−}

== Applications ==
=== Electroplating ===
The main application of Zn(CN)_{2} is for electroplating of zinc from aqueous solutions containing additional cyanide.

=== Organic synthesis ===
Zn(CN)_{2} is used to introduce the formyl group in to aromatic compounds in the Gatterman reaction where it serves a convenient, safer, and non-gaseous alternative to HCN. Because the reaction uses HCl, Zn(CN)_{2} also supplies the reaction in situ with ZnCl_{2}, a Lewis acid catalyst. Examples of Zn(CN)_{2} being used in this way include the synthesis of 2-hydroxy-1-naphthaldehyde and mesitaldehyde.

Zn(CN)_{2} is also employed as a catalyst for the cyanosilylation of aldehydes and ketones.
