= Calcium perchlorate =

Names
- IUPAC name Calcium perchlorate
- Other names Calcium perchlorate tetrahydrate, Calcium diperchlorate, Perchloric acid calcium salt (2:1), Calcium perchlorate, hydrated

Identifiers
CAS Number	13477-36-6
3D model (JSmol)	Interactive image
ChemSpider	55537
ECHA InfoCard	100.033.411
EC Number	236-768-0
PubChem CID	61629
UNII	8249MC3K19
CompTox Dashboard (EPA)	DTXSID20890703
- InChI: InChI=1S/Ca.2ClHO4/c;2*2-1(3,4)5/h;2*(H,2,3,4,5)/q+2;;/p-2 Key: ZQAOXERLHGRFIC-UHFFFAOYSA-L; InChI=1/Ca.2ClHO4/c;2*2-1(3,4)5/h;2*(H,2,3,4,5)/q+2;;/p-2 Key: ZQAOXERLHGRFIC-NUQVWONBAO
- SMILES: [Ca+2].O=Cl(=O)(=O)[O-].[O-]Cl(=O)(=O)=O

Properties
Chemical formula	Ca(ClO_{4})_{2}
Molar mass	238.9792 g/mol
Appearance	White to yellow crystalline solid
Density	2.651 g/cm^{3}
Melting point	270 °C (518 °F; 543 K)
Solubility in water	188.7 g/100 g
Solubility in acetone	61.76 g/100 g
Solubility in ethyl acetate	113.5 g/100 g
Solubility in ethanol	166.2 g/100 g
Solubility in ethyl ether	0.26 g/100 g
Solubility in methanol	237.4 g/100 g

Hazards
- Occupational safety and health (OHS/OSH)
Main hazards	oxidiser
- GHS labelling
Pictograms	(GHS03: Oxidizing)
Signal word	Danger
Hazard statements	H271
Precautionary statements	P210, P220, P221, P280, P283, P306+P360, P370+P378, P371+P380+P375, P501
NFPA 704 (fire diamond)	2 0 1 OX
- Except where otherwise noted, data are given for materials in their standard state (at 25 °C [77 °F], 100 kPa). Infobox references

Calcium perchlorate is classified as a metal perchlorate salt with the molecular formula Ca(ClO_{4})_{2}. It is an inorganic compound that is a yellow-white crystalline solid in appearance. As a strong oxidizing agent, it reacts with reducing agents when heated to generate heat and products that may be gaseous (which will cause pressurization in closed containers). Calcium perchlorate has been categorized as having explosive reactivity. Ca(ClO_{4})_{2} is a common chemical on the soil of planet Mars, counting for almost 1% of the Martian dust, by weight.

== Properties ==
Calcium perchlorate is a strong inorganic oxidizing agent, enhancing the combustion of other substances that can potentially lead to explosion. The perchlorate ion, ClO^{−}_{4}, has a highly symmetrical tetrahedral structure that is strongly stabilized in solution by its low electron-donating proton-accepting power and its relatively low polarizability.

=== Eutectic system ===
Calcium perchlorate solution forms a simple eutectic system. The eutectic composition of the calcium perchlorate solution is 4.2 mol / 1000 g H_{2}O, very similar to the composition of closely related metal cation perchlorates of strontium and barium.

== Occurrences ==
=== Electrolyte conductance ===
Electrolyte conductance of Ca(ClO_{4})_{2} and double charged metal cations in the organic solvent acetonitrile has been tested. The interest in metal cation perchlorate interactions with photosensitive ligands has increased due to the development of highly specific fluorescence indicators.

== Production ==
Perchlorate salts are the product of a base and perchloric acid. Calcium perchlorate can be prepared through the heating of a mixture of calcium carbonate and ammonium perchlorate. Ammonium carbonate forms in the gaseous state, leaving behind a calcium perchlorate solid.

== Reactions ==
=== Water ===
Being very hygroscopic, calcium perchlorate is commonly seen in the presence of four water molecules, referred to as calcium perchlorate tetrahydrate Ca(ClO_{4})_{2}·4H_{2}O.

=== Cyclic hydrogenphosphonates ===
A hybrid organic-inorganic molecule is formed using dioxazaphosphocanes, eight-membered cyclic hydrogenphosphonates and calcium. Calcium from the calcium perchlorate contributes to the structural integrity of the oligomeric molecule; the four calcium ions are bridged between four dioxazaphosphocane moieties.

== Human toxicity ==
Calcium perchlorate is slightly toxic to humans, by ingestion or inhalation of dust particles, or (less so) by skin contact.
