= Nickel(II) iodide =

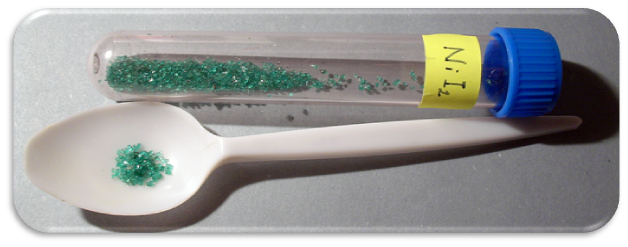
- Nickel(II) iodide hexahydrate, NiI_{2}•6H_{2}O Hexahydrate

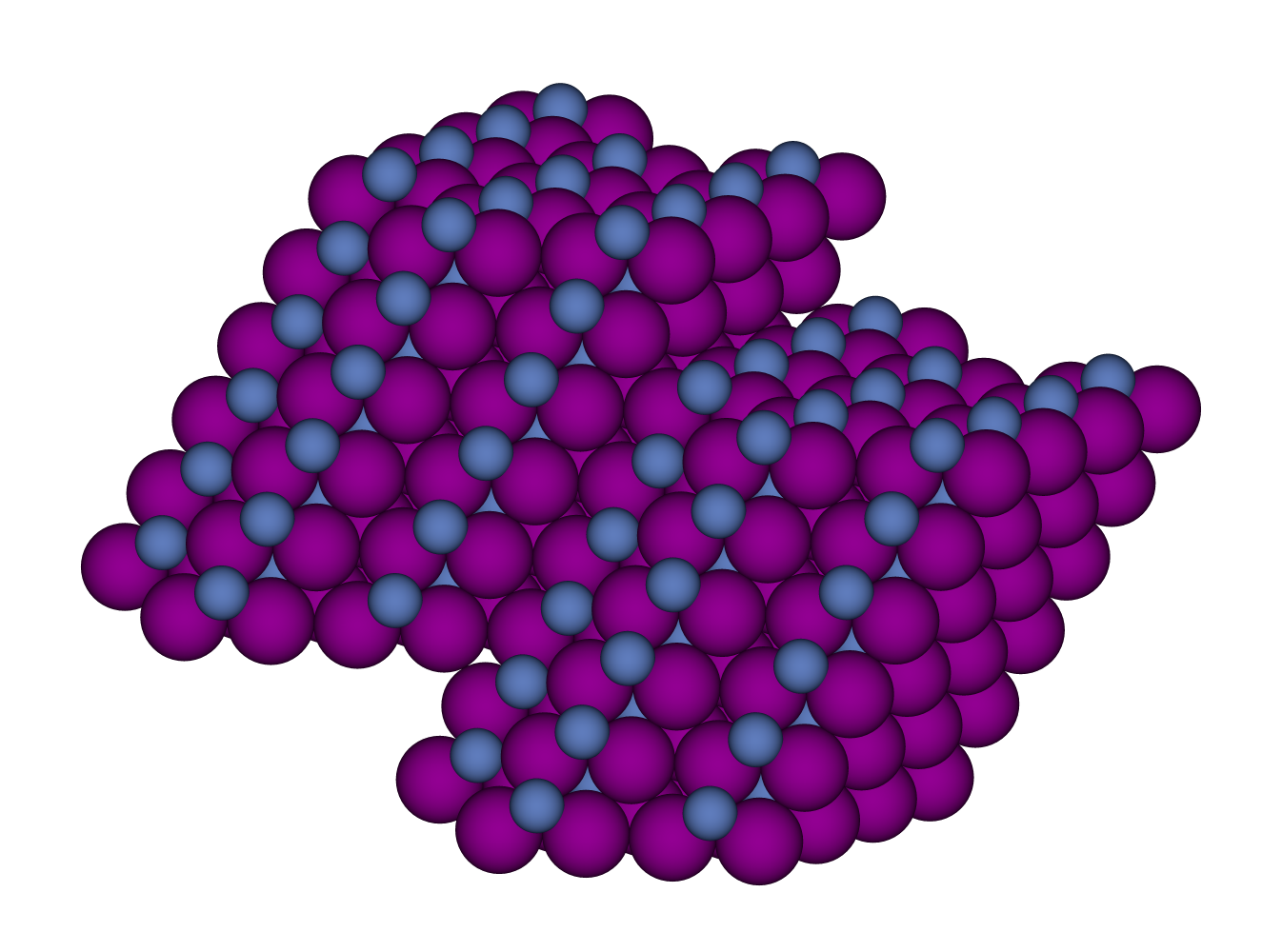
- Nickel(II) iodide

Names
- IUPAC name Nickel(II) iodide
- Other names Nickelous iodide

Identifiers
CAS Number	13462-90-3
3D model (JSmol)	Interactive image; hexahydrate: Interactive image
ChemSpider	24252; hexahydrate: 32816205
ECHA InfoCard	100.033.319
EC Number	236-666-6
PubChem CID	26038; hexahydrate: 138962054
UNII	AQ9OJ30HDD
CompTox Dashboard (EPA)	DTXSID1065479
- InChI: Key: BFSQJYRFLQUZKX-UHFFFAOYSA-L; InChI=1S/2HI.Ni/h2*1H;/q;;+2/p-2; hexahydrate: InChI=1S/2HI.Ni.6H2O/h2*1H;;6*1H2/q;;+2;;;;;;/p-2 Key: IBSOYFJDSVROOT-UHFFFAOYSA-L
- SMILES: [Ni](I)I; hexahydrate: I[Ni]I.O.O.O.O.O.O

Properties
Chemical formula	I_{2}Ni
Molar mass	312.5023 g·mol^{−1}
Appearance	iron-black solid (anhydrous) bluish-green solid (hexahydrate)
Density	5.384 g/cm^{3}
Melting point	780 °C (1,440 °F; 1,050 K) (anhydrous); 43 °C (hexahydrate, loses water)
Solubility in water	124.2 g/100 mL (0 °C); 188.2 g/100 mL (100 °C)
Solubility	alcohols
Magnetic susceptibility (χ)	+3875.0·10^{−6} cm^{3}/mol

Hazards
- GHS labelling
Pictograms	(GHS08: Health hazard) (GHS09: Environmental hazard)
Signal word	Danger
Hazard statements	H317, H334, H341, H350i, H360D, H372, H410
Precautionary statements	P203, P233, P260, P264, P270, P271, P272, P273, P280, P284, P302+P352, P304+P340, P318, P319, P321, P333+P317, P342+P316, P362+P364, P391, P403, P405, P501

Related compounds
Other anions	Nickel(II) chloride; Nickel(II) bromide; Nickel(II) fluoride
Other cations	Cobalt iodide; Copper iodide
- Except where otherwise noted, data are given for materials in their standard state (at 25 °C [77 °F], 100 kPa). verify (what is ?) Infobox references

Nickel(II) iodide is an inorganic compound with the formula NiI_{2}. This paramagnetic black solid dissolves readily in water to give bluish-green solutions, from which crystallizes the aquo complex [Ni(H_{2}O)_{6}]I_{2} (image above). This bluish-green colour is typical of hydrated nickel(II) compounds. Nickel iodides find some applications in homogeneous catalysis.

== Structure and synthesis ==
The anhydrous material crystallizes in the CdCl_{2} motif, featuring octahedral coordination geometry at each Ni(II) center.

Hydrated NiI_{2} is produced by treating nickel(II) hydroxide with hydroiodic acid. Anhydrous NiI_{2} is prepared by dehydration of its hydrates at 140 °C. The anhydrous form can be produced by treating powdered nickel with iodine.

== Applications ==
=== Catalysis ===
NiI_{2} has some industrial applications as a catalyst in carbonylation reactions. It is also has niche uses as a reagent in organic synthesis, especially in conjunction with samarium(II) iodide.

Like many nickel complexes, those derived from hydrated nickel iodide have been used in cross coupling.

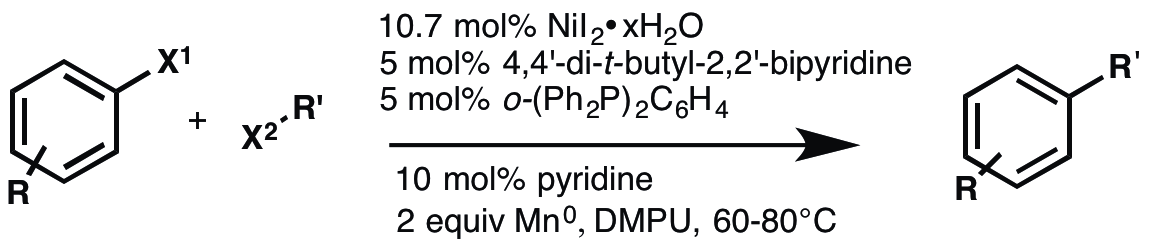
NiI_{2} as the Ni(II) precatalyst in the aryl iodide and alkyl iodide cross coupling

=== Spintronics ===
At 60 K (−213.2 °C; −351.7 °F) crystalline NiI_{2} exhibits p-wave magnetism, in which the spins of nickel atoms became arranged in a spiral pattern in two orientations. The orientations can be switched via a small electrical current. If it can be applied in digital devices, this spintronics behavior requires far less current than the conventional charge-based electronics that powers devices such as computers and phones.
