= Nickel(II) bromide =

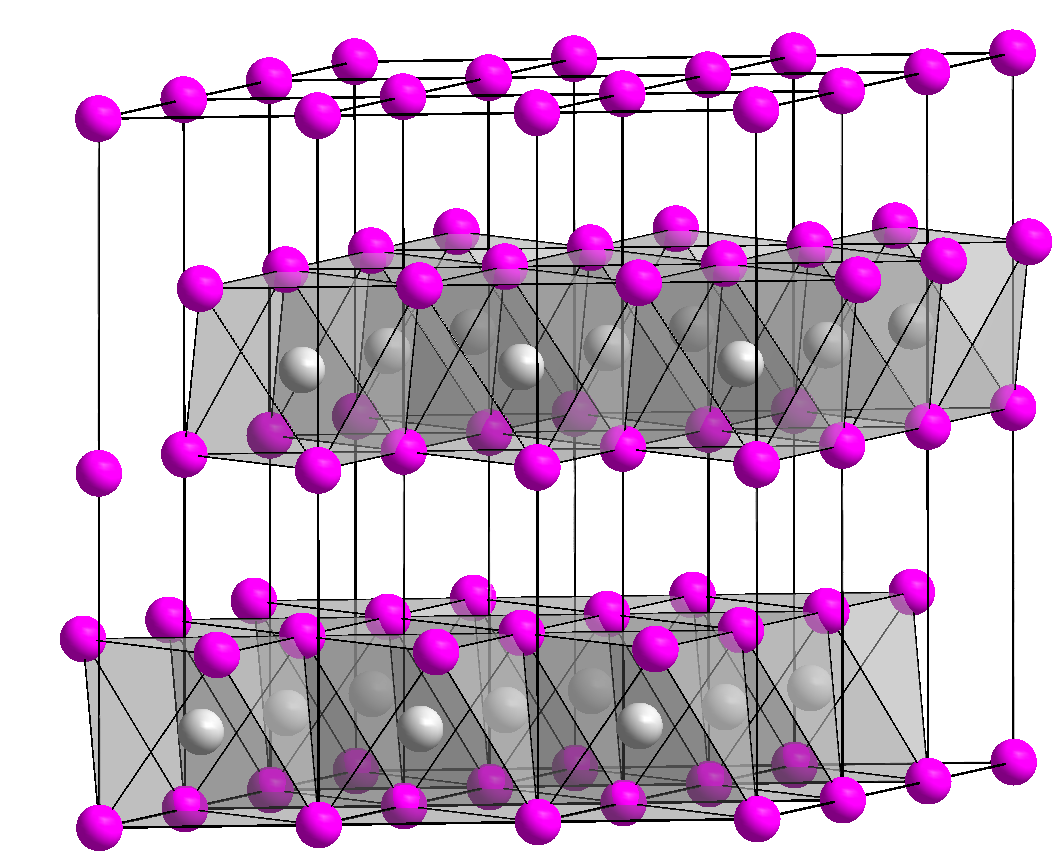

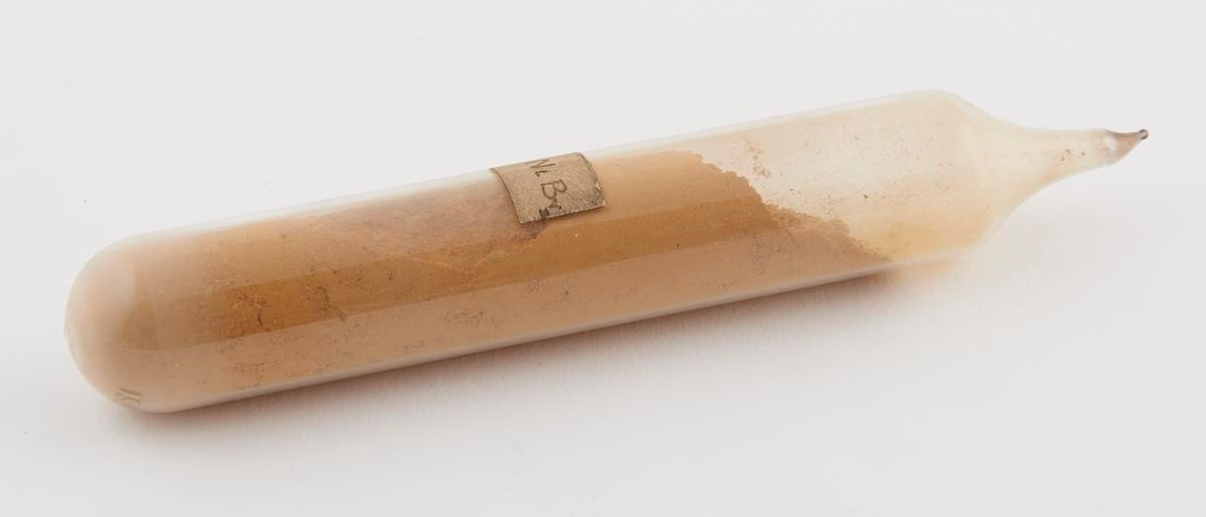
- Anhydrous

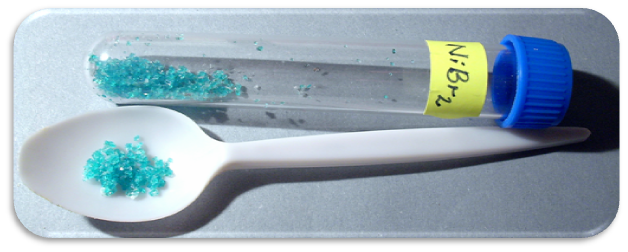
- Hexahydrate

Names
- IUPAC name Nickel(II) bromide
- Other names Nickel dibromide, Nickel bromide, Nickelous bromide

Identifiers
CAS Number	13462-88-9 Anhydrous; 13596-19-5 dihydrate; 7789-49-3 trihydrate; 18721-96-5 hexahydrate
3D model (JSmol)	Interactive image
ChemSpider	24251
ECHA InfoCard	100.033.318
EC Number	236-665-0
PubChem CID	278492
UNII	41SGH8A2S6
UN number	3288 (NICKEL BROMIDE)
CompTox Dashboard (EPA)	DTXSID40928693
- InChI: InChI=1S/2BrH.Ni/h2*1H;/q;;+2/p-2 Key: IPLJNQFXJUCRNH-UHFFFAOYSA-L
- SMILES: [Ni+2].[Br-].[Br-]

Properties
Chemical formula	NiBr_{2}
Molar mass	218.53 g/mol
Appearance	yellow-brown crystals
Odor	odorless
Density	5.10 g/cm^{3}
Melting point	963 °C (1,765 °F; 1,236 K) sublimes
Solubility in water	1.13 kg/L (0 °C); 1.22 kg/L (10 °C); 1.31 kg/L (20 °C); 1.44 kg/L (40 °C); 1.55 kg/L (100 °C)
Band gap	2.5 eV
Magnetic susceptibility (χ)	+5600.0·10^{−6} cm^{3}/mol

Structure
Crystal structure	hexagonal, hR9
Space group	R3̅m, No. 166
Lattice constant	a = 0.36998 nm, c = 1.82796 nm
Formula units (Z)	3

Thermochemistry
Std enthalpy of formation (Δ_{f}H^{⦵}_{298})	−212.1 kJ·mol^{−1}

Hazards
- Occupational safety and health (OHS/OSH)
Main hazards	Irritant, corrosive
- GHS labelling
Pictograms	(GHS08: Health hazard) (GHS09: Environmental hazard)
Signal word	Danger
Hazard statements	H317, H334, H341, H350i, H360D, H372, H410
Precautionary statements	P203, P233, P260, P264, P270, P271, P272, P273, P280, P284, P302+P352, P304+P340, P318, P319, P321, P333+P317, P342+P316, P362+P364, P391, P403, P405, P501
NFPA 704 (fire diamond)	1 0 0
Flash point	Non-flammable

Related compounds
Other anions	nickel(II) fluoride nickel(II) chloride nickel(II) iodide
Other cations	cobalt(II) bromide copper(II) bromide palladium(II) bromide
- Except where otherwise noted, data are given for materials in their standard state (at 25 °C [77 °F], 100 kPa). verify (what is ?) Infobox references

Nickel(II) bromide is the name for the inorganic compounds with the chemical formula NiBr_{2}(H_{2}O)_{x}. The value of x can be 0 for the anhydrous material, as well as 2, 3, or 6 for the three known hydrate forms. The anhydrous material is a yellow-brown solid which dissolves in water to give blue-green hexahydrate (see picture).

== Structure ==
The structure of the nickel bromides varies with the degree of hydration. In all of these cases, the nickel(II) ion adopts an octahedral molecular geometry. Similar structures are observed in aqueous solutions of nickel bromide.

- Anhydrous NiBr_{2} adopts the hexagonal cadmium chloride structure. The interatomic distance for Ni-Br is 2.52—2.58 Å. Anhydrous NiBr_{2} is a paramagnet at room temperature. Upon cooling, it turns into an antiferromagnet at 52 K, and then into a helimagnet at 22.8 K.
- The structure of the trihydrate has not been confirmed by X-ray crystallography. It is assumed to adopt a chain structure.
- The di- and hexahydrates adopt structures akin to those for the corresponding chlorides. The dihydrate consists of a linear chain, whereas the hexahydrate features isolated trans-[NiBr_{2}(H_{2}O)_{4}] molecules together with two water molecules of crystallization.

== Reactions and uses ==
NiBr_{2} has Lewis acid character, as indicated by its tendency to hydrate and form adducts with a variety of other Lewis bases.

NiBr_{2} is also used to prepare catalysts for cross-coupling reactions and various carbonylations. NiBr_{2}-glyme shows increased activity compared to NiCl_{2}-glyme for some transformations.

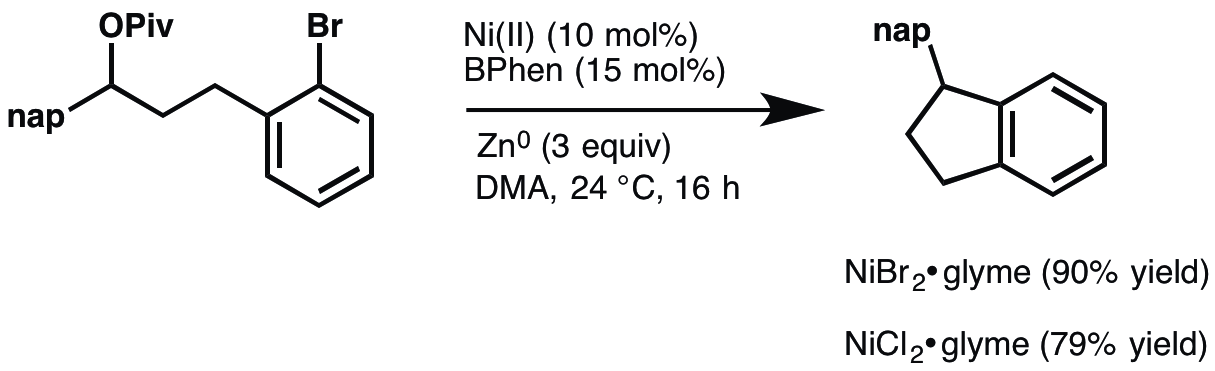
NiBr_{2}-catalyzed cross-coupling reaction

== Cited sources ==
- Haynes, William M., ed. (2016). CRC Handbook of Chemistry and Physics (97th ed.). CRC Press. ISBN 9781498754293.
