= Magnesium cyanide =

Names
- Other names: Magnesium dicyanide; Magnesium(II) cyanide

Identifiers
3D model (JSmol)	Interactive image
PubChem CID	14205320
- InChI: InChI=1S/2CN.Mg/c2*1-2;/q2*-1;+2 Key: FKWSMBAMOQCVPV-UHFFFAOYSA-N
- SMILES: [C-]#N.[C-]#N.[Mg+2]

Properties
Chemical formula	Mg(CN)_{2}
Molar mass	76.34 g/mol
Appearance	White solid
Melting point	500 °C (932 °F; 773 K) (decomposes)
Solubility in water	Reacts to form magnesium hydroxide
Solubility in ammonia	Slightly soluble

Related compounds
Other anions	Magnesium thiocyanate
Other cations	Calcium cyanide
- Except where otherwise noted, data are given for materials in their standard state (at 25 °C [77 °F], 100 kPa). Infobox references

Magnesium cyanide is a chemical compound with the formula Mg(CN)_{2}. It is a toxic white solid. Unlike calcium isocyanide, the cyanide ligands prefer to coordinate at carbon, with a 0.3‑kcal/mol isomerization barrier. When this salt is heated to 500 °C, it decomposes to magnesium nitride.

== Preparation ==
The first attempt to prepare magnesium cyanide was attempted in 1924. It was attempted by reacting a solution of hydrogen cyanide in water with magnesium metal:

HCN + Mg → Mg(CN)_{2} + H_{2}

However, no magnesium cyanide was observed, only magnesium hydroxide formed. To avoid this problem, instead of using water as the reaction medium, pure ammonia was used at -30 °C. This formed magnesium cyanide ammoniate, which in turn was heated to 180 °C to produce magnesium cyanide. Other methods are possible, such as the decomposition of magnesium ferricyanide in an electric carbon tube, which produces iron carbide as a byproduct.

== Complexes ==
Magnesium cyanide reacts with silver nitrate to form magnesium silver cyanide, with the formula MgAg_{2}(CN)_{4}. When this compound is heated it produces hydrogen cyanide gas and magnesium hydroxide in the presence of water, which meant it could not be used as a pathway for the production of magnesium cyanide. When silver nitrate reacts with magnesium cyanide, it also produces another magnesium silver cyanide, with the formula MgAg(CN)_{3}.

== Toxicity ==
Magnesium cyanide, like all cyanides, is extremely toxic. When it enters the body, it inhibits tissue respiration enzymes, and tissues lose the ability to absorb oxygen from the blood.
