= Ammonium cyanide =

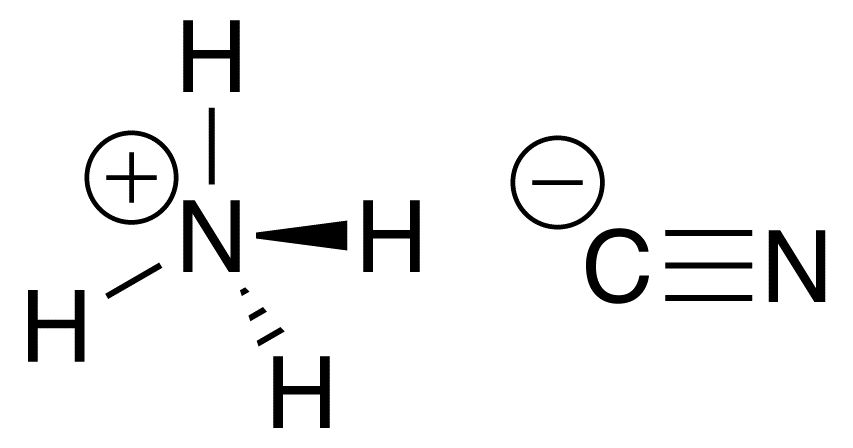

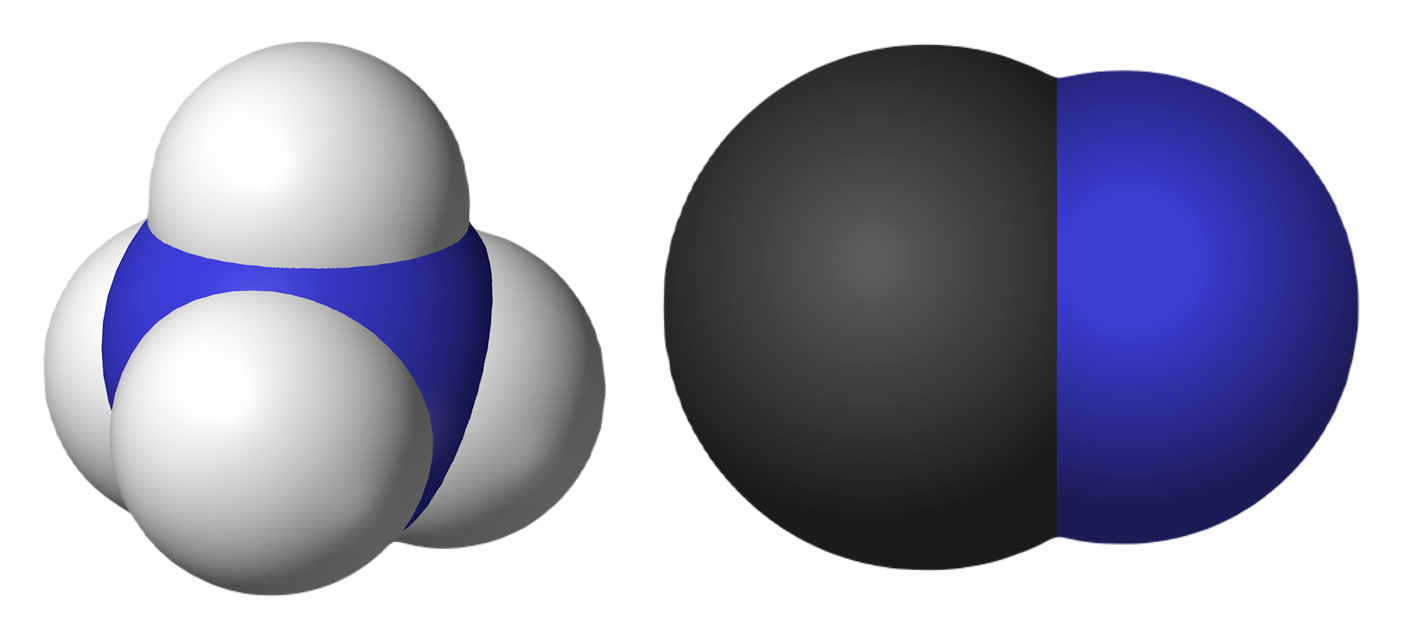

Identifiers
CAS Number	12211-52-8
3D model (JSmol)	Interactive image
ChemSpider	140210
PubChem CID	159440
UNII	898Y75UR3N
CompTox Dashboard (EPA)	DTXSID00153500
- InChI: InChI=1S/CN.H3N/c1-2;/h;1H3/q-1;/p+1 Key: ICAIHGOJRDCMHE-UHFFFAOYSA-O; InChI=1/CN.H3N/c1-2;/h;1H3/q-1;/p+1 Key: ICAIHGOJRDCMHE-IKLDFBCSAW
- SMILES: [C-]#N.[NH4+]

Properties
Chemical formula	[NH_{4}]CN
Molar mass	44.0559 g/mol
Appearance	colourless crystalline solid
Density	1.02 g/cm^{3}
Melting point	36 °C (decomp.)
Solubility in water	very soluble
Solubility	very soluble in alcohol

Structure
Crystal structure	cubic

Related compounds
Other anions	Ammonium hydroxide; Ammonium azide; Ammonium nitrate
Other cations	Sodium cyanide; Potassium cyanide
Related compounds	Ammonia; Hydrogen cyanide
- Except where otherwise noted, data are given for materials in their standard state (at 25 °C [77 °F], 100 kPa). verify (what is ?) Infobox references

Ammonium cyanide is an unstable inorganic compound with the chemical formula NH_{4}CN. It is the ammonium salt of hydrogen cyanide. It consists of ammonium cations NH^{+}_{4} and cyanide anions CN^{−}. Its structural formula is [NH_{4}]^{+}[C≡N]^{−}.

== Uses ==
Ammonium cyanide is generally used in organic synthesis. Being unstable, it is not shipped or sold commercially.

== Preparation ==
Ammonium cyanide is prepared by combining solutions of hydrogen cyanide and ammonia:

HCN + NH_{3} → NH_{4}CN

It may be prepared by the reaction of calcium cyanide and ammonium carbonate:

Ca(CN)_{2} + (NH_{4})_{2}CO_{3} → 2 NH_{4}CN + CaCO_{3}

In dry state, ammonium cyanide is made by heating a mixture of potassium cyanide or potassium ferrocyanide with ammonium chloride and condensing the vapours into ammonium cyanide crystals:

KCN + NH_{4}Cl → NH_{4}CN + KCl

== Reactions ==
Ammonium cyanide decomposes to ammonia and hydrogen cyanide, often forming a black polymer of hydrogen cyanide:

NH_{4}CN → NH_{3} + HCN

It undergoes salt metathesis reaction in solution with a number of metal salts to form metal–cyanide complexes.

Reaction with ketones and aldehydes yield aminonitriles, as in the first step of the Strecker amino acid synthesis:

NH_{4}CN + (CH_{3})_{2}CO → (CH_{3})_{2}C(NH_{2})CN + H_{2}O

== Toxicity ==
Ammonium cyanide is highly toxic.
