= Chromium(III) nitrate =

Chemical compound

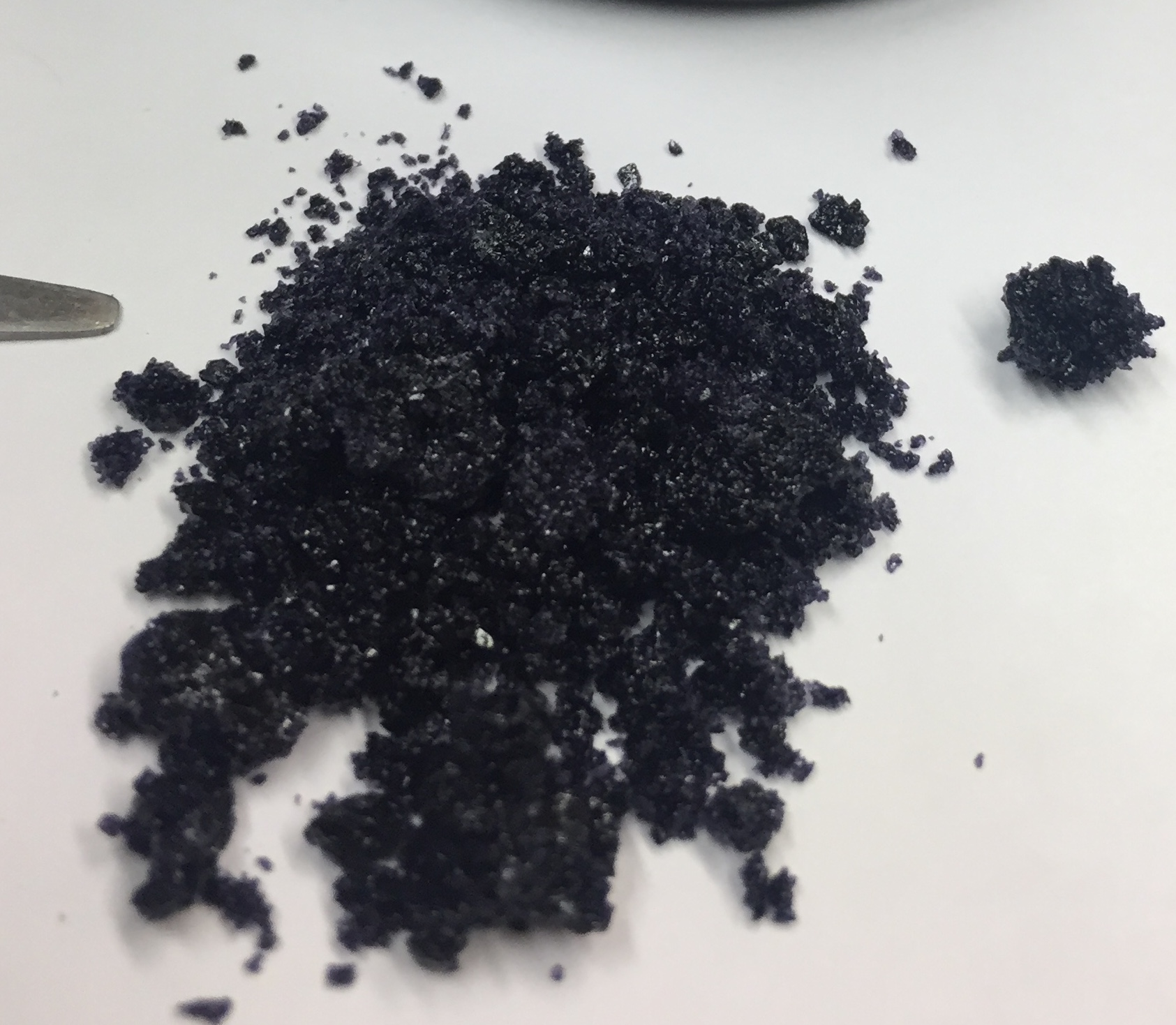
- Nonahydrate

- Chemical structure of [Cr(H_{2}O)_{6}](NO_{3})_{3}

Names
- IUPAC name Chromium(III) nitrate
- Other names Nitric acid, chromium(3+) salt

Identifiers
CAS Number	13548-38-4 (anhydrous); 7789-02-8 (nonahydrate)
3D model (JSmol)	Interactive image
ChemSpider	15285818
ECHA InfoCard	100.033.550
PubChem CID	24598
RTECS number	GB6300000
UNII	C6H0RE016B (anhydrous); D2806IOL1L (nonahydrate)
UN number	2720
CompTox Dashboard (EPA)	DTXSID8065531
- InChI: InChI=1S/Cr.3NO3/c;3*2-1(3)4/q+2;3*-1 Key: BXWGVGRRIQRLLZ-UHFFFAOYSA-N; InChI=1/Cr.3NO3/c;3*2-1(3)4/q+2;3*-1 Key: BXWGVGRRIQRLLZ-UHFFFAOYAO
- SMILES: [Cr+3].O=N([O-])=O.[O-]N(=O)=O.[O-]N(=O)=O

Properties
Chemical formula	[Cr(NO_{3})_{3} (anhydrous) [Cr(H_{2}O)_{6}](NO_{3})_{3}·3H_{2}O (nonahydrate)
Molar mass	238.011 g/mol (anhydrous); 400.21 g/mol (nonahydrate)
Appearance	Blue-violet crystals (anhydrous); Purple crystals (nonahydrate)
Density	1.85 g/cm^{3} (nonahydrate)
Melting point	60.06 °C (140.11 °F; 333.21 K) nonahydrate
Boiling point	> 100 °C (212 °F; 373 K) (decomposes)
Solubility in water	81 g/100 mL (20 °C)

Hazards
- GHS labelling
Pictograms	(GHS03: Oxidizing) (GHS07: Exclamation mark) (GHS09: Environmental hazard)
Signal word	Danger
Hazard statements	H272, H315, H317, H319, H332, H335, H411
Precautionary statements	P210, P220, P261, P264, P264+P265, P271, P272, P273, P280, P302+P352, P304+P340, P305+P351+P338, P317, P319, P321, P333+P317, P337+P317, P362+P364, P370+P378, P391, P403+P233, P405, P501
NFPA 704 (fire diamond)	3 0 1 OX
Flash point	Non-flammable
- Lethal dose or concentration (LD, LC)
LD_{50} (median dose)	3250 mg/kg (rat, oral, nonahydrate); 110 mg/kg (mouse, oral)
Safety data sheet (SDS)	Oxford MSDS
- Except where otherwise noted, data are given for materials in their standard state (at 25 °C [77 °F], 100 kPa). verify (what is ?) Infobox references

Chromium(III) nitrate describes several inorganic compounds consisting of chromium, nitrate and varying amounts of water. Most common is the dark violet hygroscopic solid. An anhydrous green form is also known. Chromium(III) nitrate compounds are of a limited commercial importance, finding some applications in the dyeing industry. It is common in academic laboratories for the synthesis of chromium coordination complexes.

== Structure ==
The formula – [Cr(H_{2}O)_{6}](NO_{3})_{3}·3H_{2}O – betrays a simple structure of this material. The chromium centers are bound to six aquo ligands, and the remaining volume of the solid is occupied by three nitrate anions and three molecules of water of crystallization.

== Properties and preparation ==
The anhydrous salt forms green crystals and is very soluble in water (in contrast to anhydrous chromium(III) chloride which dissolves very slowly except under special conditions). At 100 °C it decomposes. The red-violet hydrate is highly soluble in water. Chromium nitrate is used in the production of alkali metal-free catalysts and in pickling.

Chromium nitrate can be prepared by dissolving chromium oxide in nitric acid.
