= Calcium cyanide =

Names
- IUPAC name calcium dicyanide
- Systematic IUPAC name calcium dicyanide

Identifiers
CAS Number	592-01-8
3D model (JSmol)	Interactive image
ChemSpider	11102
ECHA InfoCard	100.008.856
EC Number	209-740-0
PubChem CID	11590
UNII	07DFJ2NTDD
CompTox Dashboard (EPA)	DTXSID6023941
- InChI: InChI=1S/2CN.Ca/c2*1-2;/q2*-1;+2
- SMILES: [Ca+2].[C-]#N.[C-]#N

Properties
Chemical formula	Ca(CN)_{2}
Molar mass	92.1128 g/mol
Appearance	white powder
Odor	hydrogen cyanide
Density	1.853 (20 °C)
Melting point	640 °C (1,184 °F; 913 K) (decomposes)
Solubility in water	soluble
Solubility	soluble in alcohol, weak acids

Structure
Crystal structure	rhombohedric

Hazards
- Occupational safety and health (OHS/OSH)
Main hazards	Highly toxic
NFPA 704 (fire diamond)	4 0 1
Autoignition temperature	Non-flammable
- Lethal dose or concentration (LD, LC)
LD_{50} (median dose)	39 mg/kg rat, oral
- Except where otherwise noted, data are given for materials in their standard state (at 25 °C [77 °F], 100 kPa). Infobox references

Calcium cyanide is the inorganic compound with the formula Ca(CN)_{2}. It is the calcium salt derived from hydrocyanic acid. It is a white solid, although the pure material is rarely encountered. It slowly hydrolyses in solution or moist air to release hydrogen cyanide and is very toxic.

== Preparation ==
Solutions of calcium cyanide can be prepared by treating calcium hydroxide with hydrogen cyanide. Solid calcium cyanide is produced commercially by heating calcium cyanamide with sodium chloride. The reaction is incomplete. The product is only of 50% purity, other components being sodium cyanide, calcium cyanamide, and carbon. Because of the carbon impurity, the solid is black, hence material is often called black cyanide.

== Reactivity ==
At temperatures around 600 °C, calcium cyanide converts to calcium cyanamide:

Ca(CN)_{2} → CaCN_{2} + C

It is suspected that this reaction is one step in the conversion of calcium carbide with nitrogen gas. The ratio of calcium cyanide to calcium cyanamide is sensitive to the presence of alkali metal halides, such as sodium chloride.

Calcium cyanide hydrolyzes upon acidification to form hydrogen cyanide:

Ca(CN)_{2} + 2 H^{+} → Ca^{2+} + 2 HCN

Calcium cyanide reacts with ammonium carbonate to give produce ammonium cyanide:

Ca(CN)_{2} + (NH_{4})_{2}CO_{3} → 2 NH_{4}CN + CaCO_{3}

== Uses ==
Calcium cyanide is used almost exclusively in the mining industry. It serves as an inexpensive source of cyanide in many leaching or vat operation to obtain precious metals such as gold and silver from their ores.

== Safety ==
Like other cyanide salts, this compound is highly toxic and its use is strictly regulated.
