= Transition metal perchlorate complexes =

Coordination complexes with perchlorate as ligand

Titanium(IV) perchlorate is a transition metal perchlorate complex.

Transition metal perchlorate complexes are coordination complexes with one or more perchlorate ligands. Perchlorate can bind to metals through one, two, three, or all four oxygen atoms. Usually however, perchlorate is a counterion, not a ligand.

== Homoleptic complexes ==
Homoleptic complexes, i.e. complexes where all the ligands are the same (in this case perchlorate), are of fundamental interest because of their simple stoichiometries.

Several anhydrous metal diperchlorate complexes are known but most are not molecular (and hence, not complexes). For example, many compounds with the formula M(ClO_{4})_{2} are coordination polymers (M = Mn, Fe, Co, Ni, Cu). An exception to this pattern is palladium(II) perchlorate Pd(ClO_{4})_{2}, which is a square planar complex consisting of a pair of bidentate perchlorate ligands. Furthermore, anhydrous Cu(ClO_{4})_{2} is sublimable, which implies the existence of molecular Cu(ClO_{4})_{2}.

Titanium(IV) perchlorate and zirconium(IV) perchlorate are molecular, featuring four bidentate perchlorate ligands. They are volatile.

== Mixed ligand complexes ==
More common than homoleptic complexes are those with two or more types of ligands. A classic case is the dicationic complex pentamminecobalt(III) perchlorate, which had resisted formation by conventional substitution reactions. It was prepared by oxidation of the azide complex:

[Co(NH_{3})_{5}N_{3}]^{2+} + ClO^{−}_{4} + NO^{+} → [Co(NH_{3})_{5}OClO_{3}]^{2+} + N_{2} + N_{2}O

Another mixed ligand complex is the perchlorate complex of the ferric derivative of octaethylporphyrin.

== Perchlorate as a counterion ==
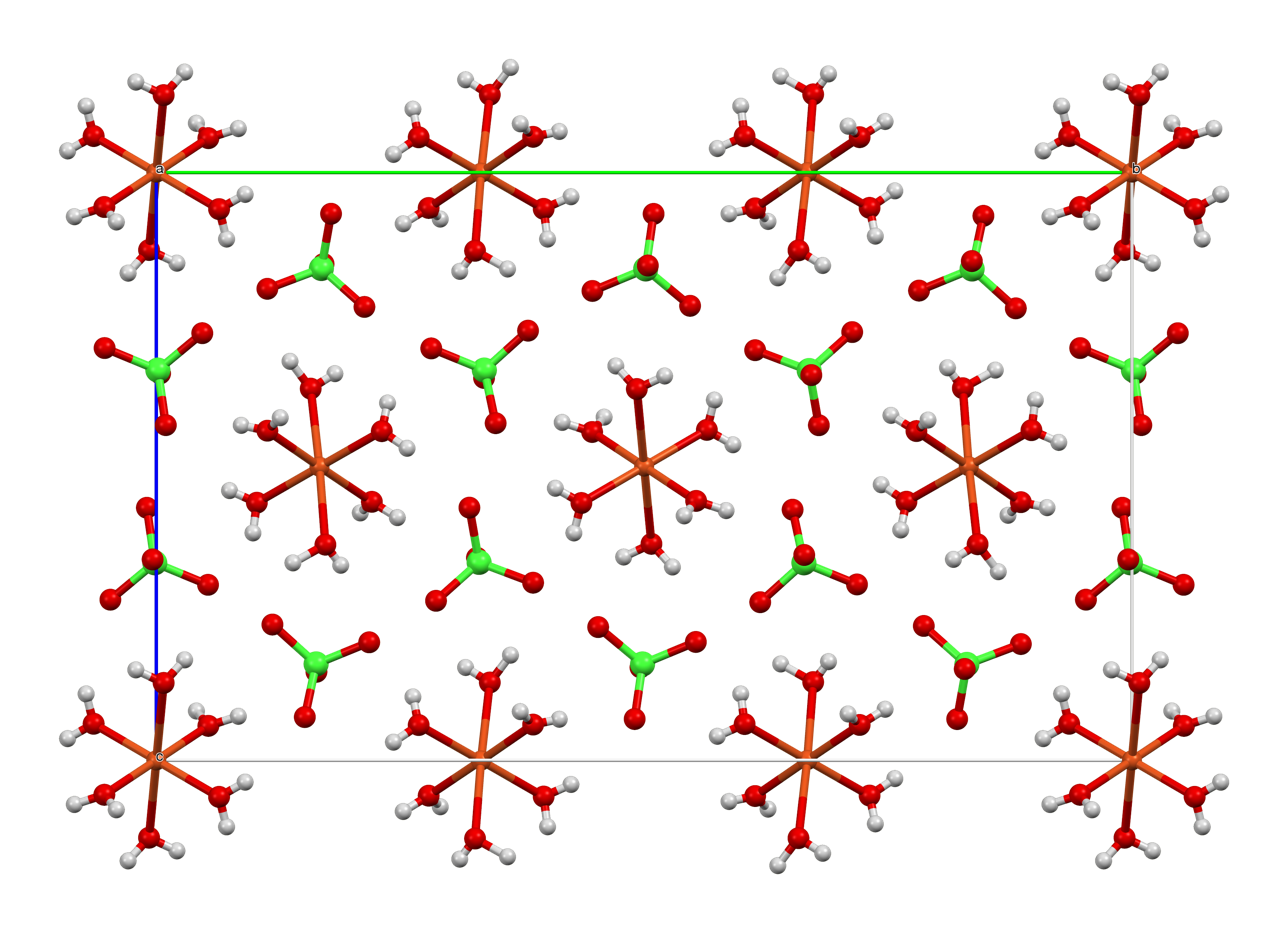
View of the structure of hydrated copper perchlorate, showing the well separated [Cu(H_{2}O)_{6}]^{2+} and ClO^{−}_{4} ions. Color code: red = O, Cu, green = Cl.

Being the conjugate base of the strongly acidic perchloric acid, perchlorate is very weakly basic. It is more commonly encountered as a counterion in coordination chemistry. Illustrative of its low basicity is the ability of water to outcompete perchlorate as a ligand for metal ions is indicated by the multitude of aquo complexes with noncoordinated perchlorate. Ferrous perchlorate, cobalt(II) perchlorate, chromium(III) perchlorate, manganese(II) perchlorate, nickel(II) perchlorate, and copper(II) perchlorate are commonly encountered as their hexaaquo complexes.

== Synthesis ==
The preparation of perchlorate complexes can be challenging because perchlorate is a weakly coordinating anion.

Chlorine trioxide is an important precursor to anhydrous perchlorate complexes. It serves as a source of ClO^{+}_{2} and ClO^{−}_{4}. It reacts with vanadium pentoxide (V_{2}O_{5}) to give VO(ClO_{4})_{3} and VO_{2}(ClO_{4}). Hydrated mercury and cadmium perchlorates can be dehydrated with Cl_{2}O_{6}, affording anhydrous compounds.

MCl_{2} + 2Cl_{2}O_{6} → ClO_{2}M(ClO_{4})_{3} + 2 ClO_{2} + Cl_{2}
ClO_{2}M(ClO_{4})_{3} → M(ClO_{4})_{2} + ClO_{2}

In some cases, chlorine trioxide serves both as an oxidant and a dehydrating agent:

M(H_{2}O)_{6}Cl_{2} + 2Cl_{2}O_{6} → [M(H_{2}O)_{6}](ClO_{4})_{2} + 2 ClO_{2}
[M(H_{2}O)_{6}](ClO_{4})_{2} + 6 Cl_{2}O_{6} → M(ClO_{4})_{2} + 6 HClO_{4} + 6 HClO_{3}

Silver perchlorate, which has some solubility in noncoordinating solvents, reacts with some metal chlorides to give the corresponding perchlorate complex.

== Reactions ==
Anhydrous perchlorate complexes are susceptible to hydrolysis:

Cu(ClO_{4})_{2} + 6 H_{2}O → [Cu(H_{2}O)_{6}](ClO_{4})_{2}

Other than that simple reaction, perchlorate resists reactions owing to its symmetry and single negative charge. Its reduction to chloride is catalyzed by metalloenzymes and by some coordination complexes.

Upon heating, some perchlorate complexes yield oxides, evolving chlorine oxides in the process. For example, thermolysis of titanium perchlorate gives TiO_{2}, ClO_{2}, and O_{2}. The titanyl species TiO(ClO_{4})_{2} is an intermediate in this decomposition.

Ti(ClO_{4})_{4} → TiO_{2} + 4ClO_{2} + 3O_{2} ΔH = +6 kcal/mol (25 kJ/mol)

== Safety ==
Perchlorate complexes and the reagents used to prepare them are often dangerously explosive intrinsically and especially in contact with organic compounds.
