= Nickel oxyacid salts =

Class of chemical compounds of nickel

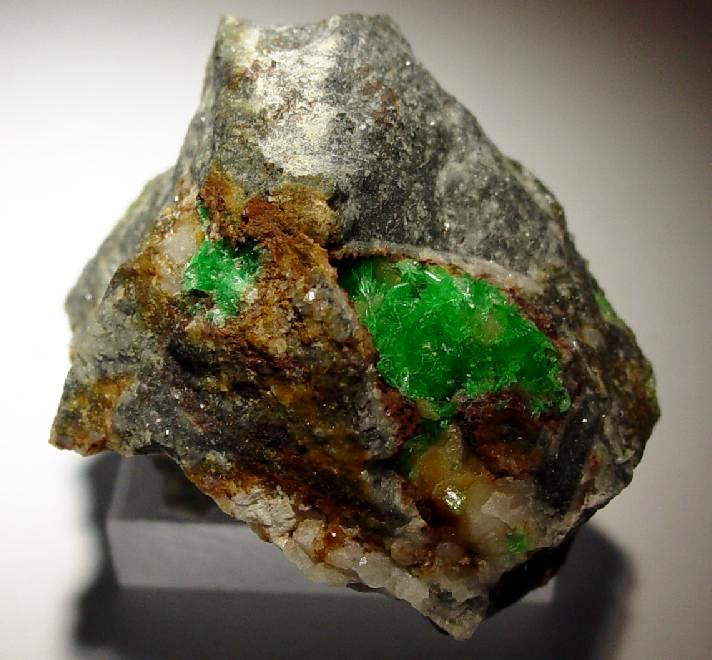
Mint green Annabergite, a nickel arsenite

The Nickel oxyacid salts are a class of chemical compounds of nickel with an oxyacid. The compounds include a number of minerals and industrially important nickel compounds.

Nickel(II) sulfate can crystallise with six water molecules yielding Retgersite or with seven making Morenosite which is isomorphic to Epsom salts. These contain the hexaquanickel(II) ion. There is also an anhydrous form, a dihydrate and a tetrahydrate, the last two crystallised from sulfuric acid. The hexahydrate has two forms, a blue tetragonal form, and a green monoclinic form, with a transition temperature around 53 °C. The heptahydrate crystallises from water below 31.5 °C above this blue hexahydrate forms, and above 53.3 °C the green form. Heating nickel sulfate dehydrates it, and then 700 °C it loses sulfur trioxide, sulfur dioxide and oxygen.

Nickel sulfite can be formed by bubbling sulfur dioxide through nickel carbonate suspended in water. A solution is formed that slowly loses sulfur dioxide, and which crystallises nickel sulfite hexahydrate. Crystals are frequently in the shape of stars, caused by the two opposite triangular enantiomorphs growing base to base. Nickel sulfite hexahydrate is highly piezoelectric. Optically it is uniaxial negative with refractive indexes ω=1.552 ε=1.509. When heated it dehydrates and then decomposes producing nickel oxide and nickel sulfate.

Nickel thiosulfate (NiS_{2}O_{3}) has the same structure as the magnesium salt. It has alternating layers of octahedral shaped nickel(II) hexahydrate, and tetrahedral shaped S_{2}O_{3}^{2−} perpendicular to the β direction. When heated to 90 °C it decomposes to form NiS. NiS_{2}O_{3} can be made from BaS_{2}O_{3} and NiSO_{4}.

Nickel sulfamate can be used for nickel or mixed nickel-tungsten plating. It can be formed by the action of sulfamic acid on nickel carbonate.

Nickel selenite (NiSeO_{3}) has many different hydrates, anhydrous NiSeO_{3} · 1/3 H_{2}O, NiSeO_{3} · H_{2}O, NiSeO_{3} · 2 H_{2}O (which is also a mineral called ahlfeldite), and NiSeO_{3} · 4 H_{2}O.

Nickel nitrate commonly crystallises with six water molecules, but can also be anhydrous, or with two, four or nine waters.

Triphenylphosphine oxide nickel nitrate [(C_{6}H_{6})_{3}PO]_{2}Ni(NO_{3})_{2} is nonionic, with nitrato as a ligand. It can be made from nickel perchlorate. It is yellow and melts at 266 °C.

Nickel carbonate (NiCO_{3} · 6 H_{2}O), hellyerite, crystallising with six water molecules, precipitates when an alkali bicarbonate is added to a Ni aqueous solution. Basic nickel carbonate, zaratite, with the formula Ni_{4}CO_{3}(OH)_{6}(H_{2}O)_{4}, is produced when alkali carbonates are added to a nickel solution.

Nickel phosphate, Ni_{3}(PO_{4})_{2} · 7 H_{2}O is also insoluble. A number of other phosphates have been made, including nanoporous substances resembling zeolites named with "Versailles Santa Barbara" or VSB. The nanoporous nickel phosphates can accommodate sufficiently small molecules and selectively catalyze reactions on them. A nickel arsenate (Ni_{3}(AsO_{4})_{2}·8H_{2}O) occurs as the mineral annabergite.

The uranates include NiU_{2}O_{6}, NiUO_{4} α and β forms (orthorhombic a=6.415 Å; b=6.435 Å; c=6.835 Å), and NiU_{3}O_{10.}

Nickel perchlorate, Ni(ClO_{4})_{2} · 6 H_{2}O, nickel chlorate, Ni(ClO_{3})_{2} · 6 H_{2}O, nickel chromate (NiCrO_{4}), nickel chromite (NiCr_{2}O_{4}), nickel(II) titanate, nickel bromate Ni(BrO_{3})_{2} · 6 H_{2}O, nickel iodate (Ni(IO_{3})_{2} · 4 H_{2}O), nickel stannate (NiSnO_{3} · 2 H_{2}O) are some other oxyacid salts.

== List ==
formula	name	mol	struct	cell Å			°	V	Z	density	colour	refs
		wt		a	b	c	β	Å^{3}		g/cm^{3}		
NiSO_{3} · 6 H_{2}O	nickel(II) sulfite hexahydrate		hexagonal	8.794		9.002		603		2.04	emerald green	
NiSO_{3} · 3 H_{2}O	nickel(II) sulfite trihydrate										light green	
NiSO_{3}•3N_{2}H_{4} · H_{2}O	nickel(II) sulfite trihydrazine hydrate										rose	
NiSO_{3}•2N_{2}H_{4} · H_{2}O	nickel(II) sulfite dihydrazine hydrate										blue	
NiS_{2}O_{3}•6H_{2}O	Nickel(II) thiosulfate hexahydrate	463.03	orthorhombic	9.282	14.44	6.803		912.1	4	2.03	green	
	diaqua (4,4´-dimethylbipyridine- N,N´)(methanol) thiosulfato(S) nickel(II)		triclinic	8.157	9.685	11.714	α=76.73 β=73.56 γ=78.23	854.2	2			
	aqua terpyridine(N,N´,N´´) thiosulfato(S,O) nickel(II) hemihydrate		monoclinic,C2/c	27.866	9.274	14.216	114.24˚	3350.	8			
	bis(dipyridylamine) thiosulfato(S,O) nickel(II) hemihydrate		orthorhombic, Iba2	12.986	16.821	19.479		4254.9	8			
NiS_{2}O_{3}(2,9-dimethyl-1,10-phenanthroline)(H_{2}O)·H_{2}O·CH_{3}OH			monoclinic, C2/c	26.269	7.641	18.381	97.00	3662	8			
NiS_{2}O_{3}(2,9-dimethyl-1,10-phenanthroline)			monoclinic, P21/n	11.108	10.955	11.666	103.32˚	1381.4	4			
Ni(NH_{2}SO_{3})_{2} · 4 H_{2}O	Nickel(II) sulfamate tetrahydrate	322.95	triclinic P1̅	6.33	6.73	6.78	α= 88.9 β=67.87 γ=67.76	245.27	1	2.19	green	
Ni(SO_{3}F)_{2}	nickel(II) fluorosulfate										yellow	
NiSeO_{3}	anhydrous nickel(II) selenite	742.68	C2/c	15.4915	9.9355	14.8416	111.173	2130.15	32	4.630	yellow brown	
NiSeO_{3}	anhydrous nickel(II) selenite	742.68	Orthorhombic	5.8803	7.5235	4.9394		218.52			yellow green high pressure	
NiSeO_{3} · 1/3 H_{2}O	alpha nickel(II) selenite one third hydrate		triclinic P1̅	8.1383	8.4034	8.5724	α=123.713 β=90.174 γ=111.823	435.83	2	1.429	citron yellow	
NiSeO_{3} · 1/3 H_{2}O	beta nickel(II) selenite one third hydrate		triclinic P1̅	8.0222	8.2133	8.4364	α=68.654 β=61.782 γ=66.363	438.11	2	1.422	citron yellow	
NiSeO_{3} · 2 H_{2}O	nickel(II) selenite dihydrate		monoclinic	6.3782	8.7734	7.5467	81.451	417.61	4	3.524	yellow brown	
NiSeO_{3} · 4 H_{2}O	nickel(II) selenite tetrahydrate										light green	
NiSe_{2}O_{5}	anhydrous nickel(II) pyroselenite		Pnab Orthorhombic	60754	10.3662	6.7913		427.71	4	4.605	light yellow	
Ni_{12}F_{2}(SeO_{3})_{8}(OH)_{6}	nickel hydroxo fluoro selenite, Dumortierite structure		hexagonal P6_{3}mc	12.702		4.922			1			
Ni_{12}(SeO_{3})_{8}(OH)_{8}	nickel hydroxy selenite, Dumortierite structure (basic nickel(II) selenite)		hexagonal P6_{3}mc	12.7004		4.9201		687.28	1		pale green	
NiTeO_{3}	anhydrous nickel(II) tellurite		Orthorhombic	5.9564	7.4986	5.2128		232.83			yellow green high pressure	
Ni_{3}TeO_{6}	trinickel tellurate (nickel(II) orthotellurate)		Hexagonal	5.103	5.103	13.781				4.272		
NiTe_{2}O_{5}	nickel pyrotellurite		Orthorhombic	8.869	8.441	12.126				5.042		
Ni_{2}Te_{3}O_{8}			Monoclinic	12.392	5.207	11.496	98.6			5.702		
Ni_{6}(TeO_{3})_{4}(OH)_{4}	nickel hydroxy tellurite		hexagonal	12.993		4.958			2		light green	
Ni_{5}Te_{4}O_{12}Cl_{2}	nickel tellurium oxychloride	1066.585	Monoclinic	19.5674	5.2457	16.3084	125.289	1366.38	4	5.186	orange	
Ni_{5}Te_{4}O_{12}Br_{2}	nickel tellurium oxybromide	1155.77	Monoclinic	20.255	5.2498	16.3005	124.937	1421.0	4	5.403	orange	
Ni_{5}Te_{4}O_{12}I_{2}	nickel tellurium oxyiodide		Monoclinic	20.766	5.230	16.464	125.79	1451.1	4		brown	
Ni_{11}(HPO_{3})_{8}(OH)_{6}	nickel hydroxyphosphite (basic nickel(II) phosphite)		hexagonal	12.6329		4.9040		677.77	1		light green	
NiMoO_{4}•xH_{2}O	nickel(II) molybdate (hydrate)		monoclinic	11.923	8.220	14.007	113.01	1264				
Ni(NO_{3})_{2} · 2 H_{2}O	nickel(II) nitrate dihydrate		triclinic	5.09465	7.10410	8.42881	γ=78.698 β=102.7640 α=83.1985	287.5				
Ni(NO_{3})_{2} · 4 H_{2}O	nickel(II) nitrate tetrahydrate		triclinic	7.5710	6.623	16.26	γ=97.26 β= 90.015 α=82.57	802.3				
NiN_{2}O_{2}	nickel(II) hyponitrite										light green	
NiP_{2}O_{6} · 12 H_{2}O	nickel(II) hypophosphate		orthorhombic Pnmm	11.2418	18.5245	7.3188		1523.1	4	2.142		
Ni_{3}(PO_{4})_{2}	nickel(II) phosphate		monoclinic	10.1059	4.6964	5.8273	91.138	276.52	2	4.396	greenish yellow	
α-Ni_{2}P_{2}O_{7}	alpha nickel(II) pyrophosphate		monoclinic	6.9177	8.275	8.974	113.879	469.7	4	4.12	∃ α',β and δ forms	
NiHPO_{4}	nickel(II) hydrophosphate										beige yellow	
[Ni(PO_{3})_{2}]_{3}•xH_{2}O	nickel trimetaphosphate											
[Ni(PO_{3})_{2}]_{4}•xH_{2}O	nickel tetrametaphosphate											
Ni_{2}P_{4}O_{12}	nickel cyclotetraphosphate		monoclinic C12/c1	11.611	8.218	9.826	118.41	824.7	4		green	
Ni_{12}H_{6}(PO_{4})_{8}(OH)_{6}	nickel hydroxy phosphate (basic nickel(II) phosphate)		hexagonal	12.4697		4.9531			1		light green	
(H_{3}O^{+}NH_{4}^{+})_{4}[Ni_{18}(HPO_{4})_{14}(OH)_{3}F_{9}]•12H_{2}O	Nanoporous nickel phosphate VSB-1		hexagonal	19.834		5.0379		1710				
Ni_{20}[(OH)_{12}(H_{2}O)_{6}][(HPO_{4})_{8}(PO_{4})_{4}]•12H_{2}O	Nanoporous nickel phosphate VSB-5		hexagonal	18.153		6.387		1827				
Ni_{3}P_{6}O_{18} · 17 H_{2}O	nickel hexametaphosphate		triclinic	9.109	9.267	10.75113	α=84.885 β=102.44 γ=101.64	867.4			pale green	
Ni_{3}(AsO_{4})_{2}·8H_{2}O	annabergite		Monoclinic	10.179	13.309	4.725	105		2		light green	
Ni_{12}H_{6}(AsO_{4})_{8}(OH)_{6}	nickel hydroxy arsenate (basic nickel(II) arsenate)		hexagonal	12.678		5.0259			1		light green	
NiAs_{2}O_{4}	Nickel arsenite											
Ni_{3}(AsO_{4})_{2}	o-nickel orthoarsenate	454.01	orthorhombic	5.943	11.263	8.164		546.5	4	5.517		
Ni_{3}(AsO_{4})_{2}	m-nickel orthoarsenate xanthiosite	453.91	monoclinic	5.764	9.559	10.194	92.95	560.9	4	5.394	golden yellow	
Ni_{8.5}As_{3}O_{16}	Aerugite	979.8	trigonal	5.9511		27.567		281.9	1	5.772	dark green	
NiSb_{2}O_{4}	Nickel metantimonite		tetragonal	8.6388		5.9052		413.58		(at 240K)		
NiSb_{2}O_{6}	Nickel metantimonate (nickel antimony oxide)		P4_{2}/mnm	4.62957		9.1981			2			
Ni(H_{2}O)_{6}[Sb(OH)_{6}]_{2}	bottinoite Nickel hexahydroantimonate(V)		P3	16.060		9.792		2187.2	6		pale blue	
NiTa_{2}O_{6}	Nickel metatantalate		P4_{2}/mnm	4.71581		9.1163			2			
NiSn(SO_{3}F)_{6}	nickel tin fluorosulfate										light yellow	
Ni(SO_{3}CF_{3})_{2}	nickel trifluoromethanesulfonate											
NiSn(SO_{3}CF_{3})_{6}	nickel tin triflate										light yellow	
(Ni,Mg)_{10}Ge_{3}O_{16}		871.7	trigonal R3̅	5.8850		28.6135		286.1	1	5.060		
NiCO_{3}	anhydrous nickel(II) carbonate	118.72	rhombohedral	4.6117		14.735		271.39	6	4.358		
Ni_{2}SiO_{4}	nickel(II) orthosilicate liebenbergite nickel silicate olivine		orthorhombic Pbnm	4.727	10.120	5.911		285.0	4			
Ni_{2}GeO_{4}	nickel orthogermanate		cubic Fd3m	8.221					8			
Ni(CN)_{2}	anhydrous nickel(II) cyanide		tetragonal quad layer	4.8570		12.801			4			
NiB_{4}O_{7}	γ-nickel(II) metadiborate		P6_{5}22	4.256		34.905		547.5	6			
Ni(BrO_{4})_{2}•6H_{2}O	nickel(II) perbromate hexahydrate	454.61	trigonal P3̅	7.817		5.235		277.9	1	2.725		
