= Cerium(IV) perchlorate =

Names
- IUPAC name Cerium(IV) perchlorate
- Other names: Cerium perchlorate; Cerium(4+) perchlorate; Cerium tetraperchlorate

Identifiers
CAS Number	14338-93-3
3D model (JSmol)	Interactive image
ChemSpider	146182
ECHA InfoCard	100.034.794
EC Number	238-290-8
PubChem CID	167073
CompTox Dashboard (EPA)	DTXSID40890740
- InChI: InChI=1S/Ce.4ClHO4/c;4*2-1(3,4)5/h;4*(H,2,3,4,5)/q+4;;;;/p-4 Key: VDNBDUGCNUZGGR-UHFFFAOYSA-J
- SMILES: [O-]Cl(=O)(=O)=O.[O-]Cl(=O)(=O)=O.[O-]Cl(=O)(=O)=O.[O-]Cl(=O)(=O)=O.[Ce+4]

Properties
Chemical formula	Ce(ClO_{4})_{4}
Molar mass	537.92 g/mol
Density	1.556 g/cm^{−3} (25 °C)
Melting point	725 °C (1,337 °F; 998 K)

Hazards
- GHS labelling
Pictograms	(GHS03: Oxidizing)
Signal word	Warning
Hazard statements	H272
Precautionary statements	P210, P220, P280, P370+P378, P501

Related compounds
Other cations	Titanium perchlorate, Zirconium perchlorate
Related compounds	Cerium(III) perchlorate
- Except where otherwise noted, data are given for materials in their standard state (at 25 °C [77 °F], 100 kPa). Infobox references

Cerium(IV) perchlorate is an inorganic compound composed of cerium and perchloric acid. It has the chemical formula of Ce(ClO_{4})_{4}.

== Uses ==
Cerium(IV) perchlorate is used as a catalyst in organic chemistry for the determination of strontium and for cerimetry. It has a very high redox potential at Ce^{4+}/Ce^{3+} of +1.87 V in 8 M HClO_{4}.
