= Iron perchlorate =

Iron perchlorate may refer to:

- Iron(II) perchlorate, Fe(NO_{3})_{2}, a green compound
- Iron(III) perchlorate (or ferric perchlorate), Fe(NO_{3})_{3}, a pale violet compound
