= Zirconium selenate =

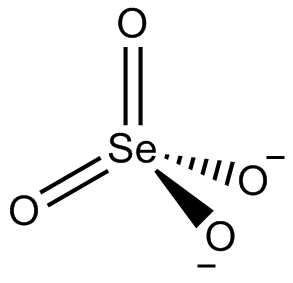

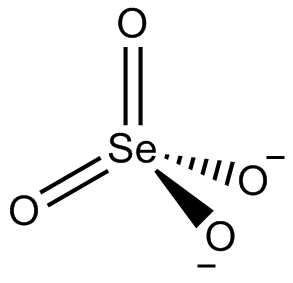

Identifiers
| CAS Number | anhydrous: 22995-90-0; tetrahydrate: 58370-92-6 |
| 3D model (JSmol) | anhydrous: Interactive image; tetrahydrate: Interactive image |
| PubChem CID | anhydrous: 157651078 |
- InChI: InChI=1S/2H2O4Se.Zr/c2*1-5(2,3)4;/h2*(H2,1,2,3,4);/q;;+4/p-4 Key: CPMVSJYYYVVNKO-UHFFFAOYSA-J; tetrahydrate: InChI=1S/2H2O4Se.4H2O.Zr/c2*1-5(2,3)4;;;;;/h2*(H2,1,2,3,4);4*1H2;/q;;;;;;+4/p-4 Key: QKCOGDUMQFBTED-UHFFFAOYSA-J
- SMILES: anhydrous: [Zr+4].[O-][Se](=O)(=O)[O-].[O-][Se](=O)(=O)[O-]; tetrahydrate: [Zr+4].[O-][Se](=O)(=O)[O-].[O-][Se](=O)(=O)[O-].O.O.O.O

Properties
| Chemical formula | Zr(SeO_{4})_{2} |
| Appearance | colourless crystals (tetrahydrate) |
| Density | 3.806 g·cm^{−3} (monohydrate); 3.36 g·cm^{−3} (tetrahydrate) |
| Boiling point | 580 °C (dec.) |
| Solubility in water | soluble (tetrahydrate) |

Related compounds
| Other anions | zirconium sulfate |
| Other cations | hafnium selenate |
- Except where otherwise noted, data are given for materials in their standard state (at 25 °C [77 °F], 100 kPa). Infobox references

Zirconium selenate is an inorganic compound with the chemical formula Zr(SeO_{4})_{2}. Its tetrahydrate can be obtained by the reaction of selenic acid and a saturated aqueous solution of zirconium oxychloride octahydrate (or zirconium hydroxide). The tetrahydrate belongs to the orthorhombic crystal system and is isostructural with Zr(SO_{4})_{2}·4H_{2}O. It loses water when heated and becomes anhydrous at 220-230 °C. It reacts with potassium fluoride to obtain K_{2}Zr(SeO_{4})_{2}F_{2}·3H_{2}O.
