= Hafnium(IV) sulfate =

Names
- Other names: Hafnium disulfate

Identifiers
CAS Number	15823-43-5
3D model (JSmol)	Interactive image; tetrahydrate: Interactive image
ChemSpider	16019775
PubChem CID	13094115
CompTox Dashboard (EPA)	DTXSID40890765
- InChI: InChI=1S/Hf.2H2O4S/c;2*1-5(2,3)4/h;2*(H2,1,2,3,4)/q+4;;/p-4 Key: NXKAMHRHVYEHER-UHFFFAOYSA-J
- SMILES: [O-]S(=O)(=O)[O-].[O-]S(=O)(=O)[O-].[Hf+4]; tetrahydrate: [O-]S(=O)(=O)[O-].[O-]S(=O)(=O)[O-].[Hf+4].O.O.O.O

Properties
Chemical formula	Hf(SO_{4})_{2}
Molar mass	370.62 g/mol (anhydrous)
Appearance	White solid
Density	4.86 g/cm^{3}
Melting point	350 °C (662 °F; 623 K) (decomposition)
Solubility in water	Soluble

Structure
Crystal structure	Orthorhombic
Coordination geometry	8 (hafnium)

Related compounds
Other anions	Hafnium(IV) nitrate
Other cations	Zirconium(IV) sulfate
- Except where otherwise noted, data are given for materials in their standard state (at 25 °C [77 °F], 100 kPa). Infobox references

Hafnium(IV) sulfate describes the inorganic chemical compounds with the formula Hf(SO_{4})_{2}·nH_{2}O, where n can range from 0 to 7. It commonly forms the anhydrous and tetrahydrate salts, which are both white solids.

== Structure ==
Anhydrous hafnium(IV) sulfate consists of a polymeric network of sulfate-bridged hafnium atoms. It is isomorphous with zirconium(IV) sulfate.

Hafnium(IV) sulfate tetrahydrate is isomorphous with zirconium(IV) sulfate tetrahydrate and consists of repeated sheets of Hf(SO_{4})_{2}(H_{2}O)_{4}, where the sulfate ligands are bidentate.

== Preparation and properties ==
The tetrahydrate is produced by the reaction of hafnium metal or hafnium(IV) oxide with concentrated sulfuric acid followed by evaporation of the solution:

Hf + 2 H_{2}SO_{4} → Hf(SO_{4})_{2} + 2 H_{2}

The anhydrous form can be produced by heating the tetrahydrate to 350 °C. If the anhydrous is heated to 820 °C, it decomposes to hafnium(IV) oxide, sulfur oxides, and oxygen. The mechanism of decomposition has not been fully elucidated.

Various hydrolyzed derivatives of hafnium(IV) oxide, such as [Hf_{18}O_{10}(OH)_{26}(SO_{4})_{12.7}(H_{2}O)_{20}]Cl_{0.6}·nH_{2}O are known.
