= Zirconium stearate =

Names
- Other names zirconium(4+) octadecanoate

Identifiers
CAS Number	15844-92-5
3D model (JSmol)	Interactive image
ChemSpider	15006980
EC Number	239-951-3
PubChem CID	20431482
CompTox Dashboard (EPA)	90166422
- InChI: InChI=1S/4C18H36O2.Zr/c4*1-2-3-4-5-6-7-8-9-10-11-12-13-14-15-16-17-18(19)20;/h4*2-17H2,1H3,(H,19,20);/q;;;;+4/p-4 Key: VRQWWCJWSIOWHG-UHFFFAOYSA-J
- SMILES: CCCCCCCCCCCCCCCCCC(=O)[O-].CCCCCCCCCCCCCCCCCC(=O)[O-].CCCCCCCCCCCCCCCCCC(=O)[O-].CCCCCCCCCCCCCCCCCC(=O)[O-].[Zr+4]

Properties
Chemical formula	C_{72}H_{140}ZrO_{8}
Molar mass	1225.1
Appearance	white powder
Density	g/cm^{3}
Boiling point	359.4 °C (678.9 °F; 632.5 K)
Solubility in water	insoluble

Hazards
Flash point	162.4 °C (324.3 °F; 435.5 K)
- Except where otherwise noted, data are given for materials in their standard state (at 25 °C [77 °F], 100 kPa). Infobox references

Zirconium stearate is a metal-organic compound, a salt of zirconium and stearic acid with the chemical formula C_{72}H_{140}ZrO_{8}.

The compound is classified as a metallic soap, i.e. a metal derivative of a fatty acid.

== Synthesis ==
Zirconium stearate is prepared by boiling stearic acid and sodium carbonate in water and then adding zirconium oxychloride solution.

Also, zirconium stearate can be prepared by reacting zirconium nitrate and sodium oleate.

== Physical properties ==
The compound forms white powder.

== Uses ==
Zirconium stearate is used as a raw material for waterproofing materials and emulsion stabilizers.

Also used as a flattening agent.
