= Manganese(II) chlorate =

Names
- Systematic IUPAC name Manganese(II) dichlorate
- Other names: Manganese dichlorate

Identifiers
3D model (JSmol)	Interactive image; (hexahydrate): Interactive image
ChemSpider	(hexahydrate): 26667097
PubChem CID	24983783
- InChI: InChI=1S/2ClHO3.Mn/c2*2-1(3)4;/h2*(H,2,3,4);/q;;+2/p-2 Key: CRPBAQAXWCOQOC-UHFFFAOYSA-L; (hexahydrate): InChI=1S/2ClHO3.Mn.6H2O/c2*2-1(3)4;;;;;;;/h2*(H,2,3,4);;6*1H2/q;;+2;;;;;;/p-2 Key: WIYJGRGEFGGGLP-UHFFFAOYSA-L
- SMILES: [O-]Cl(=O)=O.[O-]Cl(=O)=O.[Mn+2]; (hexahydrate): [O-]Cl(=O)=O.[O-]Cl(=O)=O.[Mn+2].O.O.O.O.O.O

Properties
Chemical formula	Mn(ClO_{3})_{2}
Appearance	Viscous pink liquid
Melting point	−18 °C (0 °F; 255 K)
Boiling point	6 °C (43 °F; 279 K) (decomposes)
Solubility in water	Soluble

Hazards
- GHS labelling
Pictograms	(GHS01: Explosive)

Related compounds
Other anions	Manganese(II) perchlorate
Other cations	Copper(II) chlorate
- Except where otherwise noted, data are given for materials in their standard state (at 25 °C [77 °F], 100 kPa). Infobox references

Manganese(II) chlorate is an unstable chemical compound with the formula Mn(ClO_{3})_{2}. It is unstable even in dilute solution. As a hexahydrate, it is solid below −18°C. Above this it melts, to form an extremely explosive pink liquid.

== Preparation ==
Manganese(II) chlorate was produced by the reaction of manganese(II) sulfate and barium chlorate. The water was removed by boiling in vacuum. Then the temperature was lowered to -80°C which resulted in a pink solid. Then it was cleaned with liquid nitrogen and potassium hydroxide to remove the decomposition products.

== Properties ==
Manganese(II) chlorate forms the hexahydrate when solid, the water that cannot be removed. It decomposes above 6°C, to manganese(IV) oxide, chlorine dioxide, and water. In liquid form it is very viscous and extremely explosive. When heated to room temperature, it explodes with a sharp report.
