= Zirconium iodate =

Identifiers
CAS Number	anhydrous: 22446-84-0; trihydrate: 19665-10-2
3D model (JSmol)	anhydrous: Interactive image; trihydrate: Interactive image
- InChI: InChI=1S/4HIO3.Zr/c4*2-1(3)4;/h4*(H,2,3,4);/q;;;;+4/p-4 Key: HONKFXPQYSOIMS-UHFFFAOYSA-J
- SMILES: anhydrous: [O-]I(=O)=O.[O-]I(=O)=O.[O-]I(=O)=O.[O-]I(=O)=O.[Zr+4]; trihydrate: [O-]I(=O)=O.[O-]I(=O)=O.[O-]I(=O)=O.[O-]I(=O)=O.[Zr+4].O.O.O

Properties
Chemical formula	I_{4}O_{12}Zr
Molar mass	790.830 g·mol^{−1}
Appearance	white solid
Density	4.99

Structure
Crystal structure	tetragonal
Space group	P4/n
Lattice constant	a = 8.38, c = 7.49 Å
Lattice volume (V)	526 Å^{3}
Formula units (Z)	2
- Except where otherwise noted, data are given for materials in their standard state (at 25 °C [77 °F], 100 kPa). Infobox references

Zirconium iodate is an inorganic compound with the chemical formula Zr(IO_{3})_{4}. It can be prepared by reacting sodium iodate and zirconium sulfate tetrahydrate in an aqueous solution. The resulting precipitate is dried and refluxed in concentrated nitric acid. Zirconium iodate trihydrate can be obtained by reacting hydrated zirconium oxide and iodine pentoxide (1.4~3.3% concentration) in water. Its basic salt Zr(OH)_{n}(IO_{3})_{(4−n)} is known.
