= Copper(II) phosphate =

- [Cu^{2+}]_{3}[PO^{3−}_{4}]_{2}
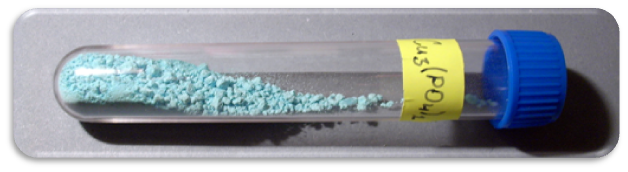

Names
- IUPAC name copper(II) phosphate
- Other names: anhydrous: cupric phosphate; tricopper diphosphate; tricopper bis(orthophosphate); copper phosphate (3:2); trihydrate: cupric phosphate trihydrate; copper(II) phosphate–water (3:2:3)

Identifiers
CAS Number	anhydrous: 7798-23-4; trihydrate: 10031-48-8
3D model (JSmol)	anhydrous: Interactive image; trihydrate: Interactive image
ChemSpider	anhydrous: 77984; trihydrate: 32699098
ECHA InfoCard	100.029.322
EC Number	anhydrous: 232-254-5
PubChem CID	anhydrous: 86469; trihydrate: 71586933
UNII	anhydrous: N8NP6FR80R; trihydrate: AH2W0VV8AX
CompTox Dashboard (EPA)	anhydrous: DTXSID00872547; trihydrate: DTXSID70143130
- InChI: anhydrous: InChI=1S/3Cu.2H3O4P/c;;;2*1-5(2,3)4/h;;;2*(H3,1,2,3,4)/q3*+2;;/p-6 Key: GQDHEYWVLBJKBA-UHFFFAOYSA-H; trihydrate: InChI=1S/3Cu.2H3O4P.3H2O/c;;;2*1-5(2,3)4;;;/h;;;2*(H3,1,2,3,4);3*1H2/q3*+2;;;;;/p-6 Key: IVAIWXUKIPQQPY-UHFFFAOYSA-H
- SMILES: anhydrous: [Cu++].[Cu++].[Cu++].[O-]P([O-])([O-])=O.[O-]P([O-])([O-])=O; trihydrate: O.O.O.[Cu++].[Cu++].[Cu++].[O-]P([O-])([O-])=O.[O-]P([O-])([O-])=O

Properties
Chemical formula	Cu_{3}(PO_{4})_{2} (anhydrous); Cu_{3}(PO_{4})_{2}·3H_{2}O (trihydrate)
Molar mass	380.581 g/mol (anhydrous); 434.627 g/mol (trihydrate)
Appearance	blue-green triclinic crystals (anhydrous); blue-green orthorhombic crystals (trihydrate)
Melting point	> 300 °C (572 °F; 573 K)
Solubility in water	insoluble
Solubility product (K_{sp})	1.4×10^{−37}
Solubility in acid	soluble
Solubility in ammonium hydroxide	soluble

Structure (anhydrous)
Crystal structure	triclinic
Space group	P1̅
Point group	1̅
Lattice constant	a = 4.854 Å, b = 5.29 Å, c = 6.182 Å α = 72.35°, β = 86.99°, γ = 68.54°
Lattice volume (V)	140.95 Å
Formula units (Z)	1

Structure (trihydrate)
Crystal structure	orthorhombic

Hazards
- GHS labelling
Pictograms	(GHS07: Exclamation mark)
Signal word	Warning
Hazard statements	H302, H315, H319, H335
Precautionary statements	P280, P305+P351+P338
NFPA 704 (fire diamond)	2 0 0
Threshold limit value (TLV)	1 mg/m^{3} (TWA)
- NIOSH (US health exposure limits)
PEL (Permissible)	TWA 1 mg/m^{3} (as Cu)
REL (Recommended)	TWA 1 mg/m^{3} (as Cu)
IDLH (Immediate danger)	TWA 100 mg/m^{3} (as Cu)

Related compounds
Other cations	Cobalt(II) phosphate; Iron(II) phosphate; Manganese(II) phosphate; Nickel(II) phosphate
- Except where otherwise noted, data are given for materials in their standard state (at 25 °C [77 °F], 100 kPa). Infobox references

Copper(II) phosphate is an inorganic compound with the chemical formula Cu_{3}(PO_{4})_{2}. It can be regarded as the cupric salt of phosphoric acid. Anhydrous copper(II) phosphate and a trihydrate are blue solids.

== Occurrence ==
Copper(II) phosphate is relatively commonly encountered as the hydrated species Cu_{2}(PO_{4})OH, which is green and occurs naturally as the mineral libethenite. Pseudomalachite, Cu_{5}(PO_{4})_{2}(OH)_{4}, is the most common copper phosphate in nature, typical for some oxidation zones of copper ore deposits.

== Structure ==
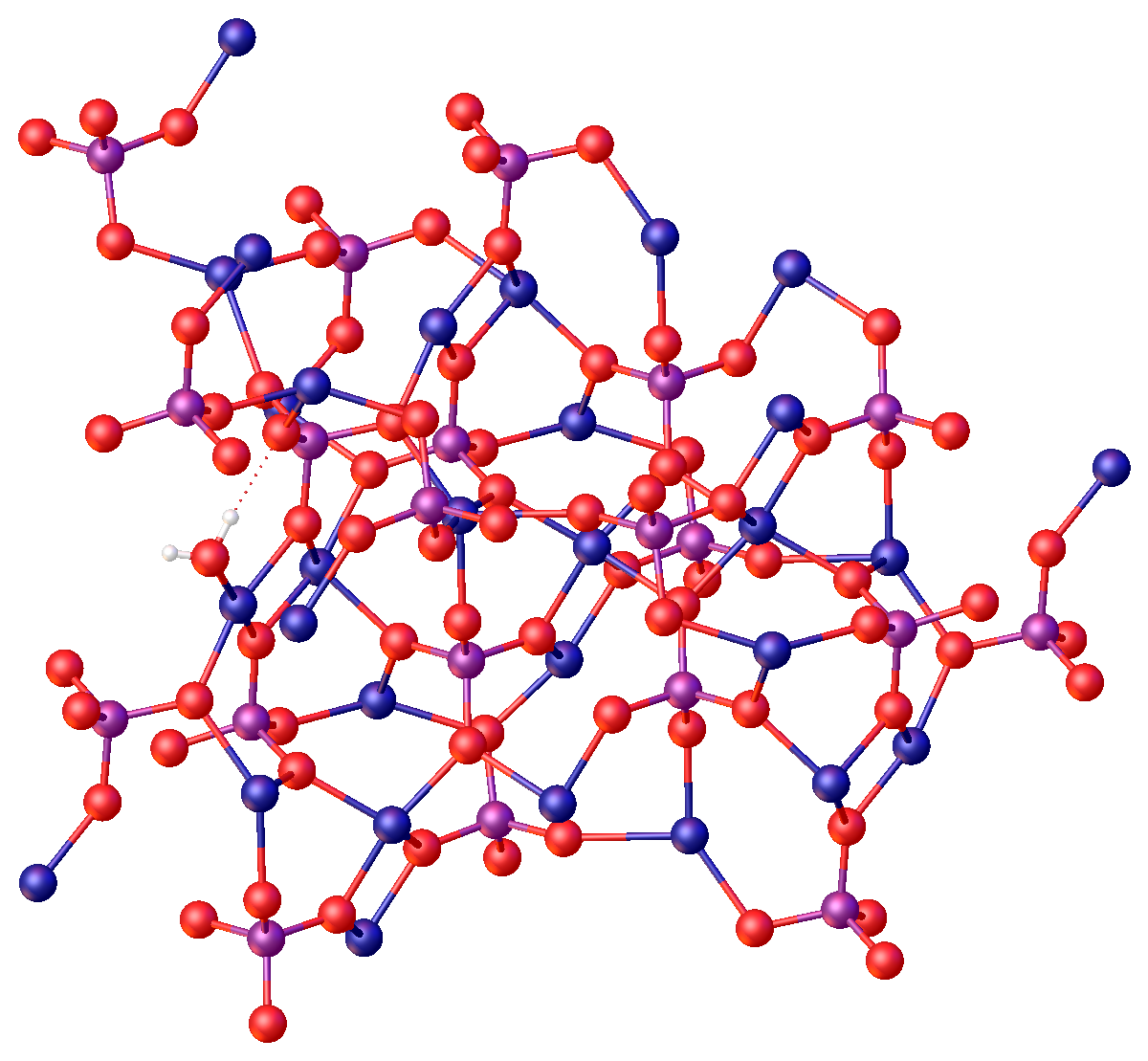
Structure of Cu_{3}(PO_{4})_{2}·H_{2}O. Color code: red = O, blue = Cu, purple = P.

In terms of structure, copper(II) phosphate is a coordination polymer, as is typical for most metal phosphates. The phosphate center is tetrahedral. In the anhydrous material, the copper centers are pentacoordinate. In the monohydrate, the copper adopts 6-, 5-, and 4-coordinate geometries.

== Preparation ==
Hydrated copper(II) phosphate precipitates upon addition of a solution of alkali metal phosphate to an aqueous solution of copper(II) sulfate. The anhydrous material can be produced by a high-temperature (1,000 °C (1,830 °F)) reaction between diammonium phosphate and copper(II) oxide.

2 (NH_{4})_{2}HPO_{4} + 3 CuO → Cu_{3}(PO_{4})_{2} + 3 H_{2}O + 4 NH_{3}

In laboratories, copper phosphate is prepared by the addition of phosphoric acid to an alkali copper salt such as copper hydroxide, or basic copper carbonate:

3 Cu(OH)_{2} + 2 H_{3}PO_{4} → 6 H_{2}O + Cu_{3}(PO_{4})_{2}
3 Cu_{2}(OH)_{2}CO_{3} + 4 H_{3}PO_{4} → 2 Cu_{3}(PO_{4})_{2} + 3 CO_{2} + 9 H_{2}O

== Uses ==
Copper(II) phosphate has many uses. Due to it being a copper metal salt it can be used as a fungicide; it works by denaturating proteins and enzymes in cells of pathogens. Many other copper salts, such as copper(II) sulfate (CuSO_{4}), are used as fungicides.

Another use of copper(II) phosphate is as a fertilizer. Copper is one of the 16 essential elements required for plant growth. Copper(II) phosphate supplies the plant with both phosphorus and copper, which stimulates growth.
