= Iron(III) perchlorate =

Names
- Other names: Ferric perchlorate

Identifiers
CAS Number	13537-24-1; hydrate: 15201-61-3
3D model (JSmol)	Interactive image; hydrate: Interactive image; hexahydrate: Interactive image; nonahydrate: Interactive image
ChemSpider	140399; hydrate: 7975359; hexahydrate: 25945039
ECHA InfoCard	100.033.538
EC Number	236-908-0
PubChem CID	159679; hydrate: 9799594; hexahydrate: 15793994
CompTox Dashboard (EPA)	DTXSID50890670; hydrate: DTXSID80430922
- InChI: InChI=1S/3ClHO4.Fe/c3*2-1(3,4)5;/h3*(H,2,3,4,5);/q;;;+3/p-3; hydrate: InChI=1S/3ClHO4.Fe.H2O/c3*2-1(3,4)5;;/h3*(H,2,3,4,5);;1H2/q;;;+3;/p-3 Key: PFPIMAZLJXJVAN-UHFFFAOYSA-K; hexahydrate: InChI=1S/3ClHO4.Fe.6H2O/c3*2-1(3,4)5;;;;;;;/h3*(H,2,3,4,5);;6*1H2/q;;;+3;;;;;;/p-3 Key: GJMIMISVJLOUGG-UHFFFAOYSA-K; nonahydrate: InChI=1S/3ClHO4.Fe.9H2O/c3*2-1(3,4)5;;;;;;;;;;/h3*(H,2,3,4,5);;9*1H2/q;;;+3;;;;;;;;;/p-3 Key: JWCPSNBNEQGKFX-UHFFFAOYSA-K
- SMILES: [O-]Cl(=O)(=O)=O.[O-]Cl(=O)(=O)=O.[O-]Cl(=O)(=O)=O.[Fe+3]; hydrate: O.[O-]Cl(=O)(=O)=O.[O-]Cl(=O)(=O)=O.[O-]Cl(=O)(=O)=O.[Fe+3]; hexahydrate: O.O.O.O.O.O.[O-]Cl(=O)(=O)=O.[O-]Cl(=O)(=O)=O.[O-]Cl(=O)(=O)=O.[Fe+3]; nonahydrate: O.O.O.O.O.O.O.O.O.[O-]Cl(=O)(=O)=O.[O-]Cl(=O)(=O)=O.[O-]Cl(=O)(=O)=O.[Fe+3]

Properties
Chemical formula	Fe(ClO_{4})_{3}
Molar mass	354.19 g/mol (anhydrous); 516.34 g/mol (nonahydrate)
Appearance	Canary yellow solid (anhydrous); Pale violet solid (nonahydrate)
Density	2.03 g/cm^{3} (nonahydrate)
Melting point	110 °C (230 °F; 383 K) (decomposition, nonahydrate)
Solubility in water	nonahydrate 74.32 g/100 mL (0 °C); 79.86 g/100 mL (25 °C)

Structure
Crystal structure	Trigonal
Space group	R3̅c
Lattice constant	a = 16.19 Å, c = 11.24 Å
Lattice volume (V)	2553 Å^{3}
Coordination geometry	octahedral (around Fe)

Hazards
- GHS labelling
Pictograms	(GHS03: Oxidizing) (GHS07: Exclamation mark)
Signal word	Danger
NFPA 704 (fire diamond)	2 0 1 OX

Related compounds
Other anions	Iron(III) nitrate
Other cations	Manganese(II) perchlorate Cobalt(II) perchlorate
Related compounds	Iron(II) perchlorate
- Except where otherwise noted, data are given for materials in their standard state (at 25 °C [77 °F], 100 kPa). Infobox references

Iron(III) perchlorate, also known as ferric perchlorate, is an inorganic chemical compound with the formula Fe(ClO_{4})_{3}·nH_{2}O, where n can range from 0 to 9. The most common form is the nonahydrate, Fe(ClO_{4})_{3}·9H_{2}O, which is a hygroscopic pale violet crystalline solid, but samples are often partially hydrolyzed and/or contaminated with iron(III) chloride, giving them a yellow color.

== History ==
Iron(III) perchlorate was first observed by Georges-Simon Serullas in 1831 as an oxidation product of iron(II) perchlorate, who was attempting to produce various metal perchlorates after Friedrich von Stadion discovered the perchlorate ion. However, it was not properly characterized until 1935 by Folke Lindstrand.

== Preparation ==
The nonahydrate is produced by refluxing a mixture of iron(III) oxide-hydroxide and aqueous 70% perchloric acid:

FeO(OH) + 3 HClO_{4} → Fe(ClO_{4})_{3} + 2 H_{2}O

It can also be prepared by the reaction of iron(III) chloride and aqueous perchloric acid, followed by repeated recrystallization in perchloric acid.

In comparison, the synthesis of the anhydrous form is much more difficult. It is produced by the reaction of iron(III) chloride and dichlorine hexoxide at 20 °C:

2 FeCl_{3} + 7 Cl_{2}O_{6} → ClO_{2}Fe_{2}(ClO_{4})_{7} + 6 ClO_{2} + 3 Cl_{2}

The resulting ClO_{2}Fe_{2}(ClO_{4})_{7} is heated under a vacuum at 60 °C to yield the canary yellow anhydrous iron(III) perchlorate.

Hydrates other than the nonahydrate, such as the hexahydrate, from the dehydration of the nonahydrate in the presence of sulfuric acid, and the dihydrate, from the reaction of anhydrous perchloric acid and iron(III) chloride, have been reported.

== Structure ==
The nonahydrate, structurally formulated [Fe(H_{2}O)_{6}](ClO_{4})_{3}·3H_{2}O, has a trigonal crystal structure and consists of discrete octahederal [Fe(H_{2}O)_{6}]^{3+} centers as well as perchlorate and three molecules of water of crystallization.

The anhydrous form, which has been probed by IR spectroscopy, consists of bidentate perchlorate ligands.

== Reactions and applications ==
Iron(III) perchlorate dissolves in water to form [Fe(H_{2}O)_{6}]^{3+} and ClO_{4}^{–} ions. The [Fe(H_{2}O)_{6}]^{3+} partially hydrolyses:

[Fe(H_{2}O)_{6}]^{3+} ⇌ [Fe(H_{2}O)_{5}OH]^{2+} + H^{+}

Dilute solutions of iron(III) perchlorate slowly precipitate iron(III) hydroxide particles, whereas concentrated solutions do not, because the higher acidity prevents hydroxide formation. Hydrolysis can also be suppressed by adding perchloric acid. The above behavior parallels that of iron(III) nitrate solutions.

The nonahydrate decomposes at around 110 °C to an unknown basic perchlorate. The anhydrous form, when heated, similarly decomposes to an unknown basic perchlorate.

Iron(III) perchlorate has very limited applications in organic synthesis. The anhydrous and dihydrate have been studied as a cationic polymerization initiator for alkenes. The nonahydrate has been studied for use as a catalyst in various organic reactions, including multicomponent condensation reactions.
