= Titanium(IV) nitrate =

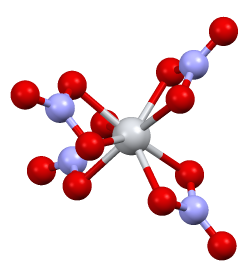
- Ball-and-stick model

Names
- Other names titanium tetranitrate, tetranitratotitanium

Identifiers
CAS Number	12372-56-4
3D model (JSmol)	Interactive image
ChemSpider	8123716
ECHA InfoCard	100.222.601
PubChem CID	139314
CompTox Dashboard (EPA)	DTXSID50924580
- InChI: InChI=1S/4NO3.Ti/c4*2-1(3)4;/q4*-1;+4 Key: QDZRBIRIPNZRSG-UHFFFAOYSA-N
- SMILES: [Ti](O[N+]([O-])=O)(O[N+]([O-])=O)(O[N+]([O-])=O)O[N+]([O-])=O

Properties
Chemical formula	Ti(NO_{3})_{4}
Molar mass	295.8866 g/mol
Appearance	white volatile solid
Density	2.192
Melting point	58 °C (136 °F; 331 K)
Boiling point	decompose
Solubility in water	Reacts

Structure
Crystal structure	monoclinic
Space group	P2_{1}/C
Lattice constant	a = 7.80, b = 13.57, c = 10.34 Å α = 90°, β = 125·0°, γ = 90°
Lattice volume (V)	896.52 Å^{3}
Formula units (Z)	4
Coordination geometry	8
Molecular shape	flattened tetrahedral

Related compounds
Related compounds	hafnium nitrate, zirconium nitrate, titanium phosphate, titanium perchlorate
- Except where otherwise noted, data are given for materials in their standard state (at 25 °C [77 °F], 100 kPa). Infobox references

Titanium nitrate is the inorganic compound with formula Ti(NO_{3})_{4}. It is a colorless, diamagnetic solid that sublimes readily. It is an unusual example of a volatile binary transition metal nitrate. Ill defined species called titanium nitrate are produced upon dissolution of titanium or its oxides in nitric acid.

== Preparation ==
Similarly to its original method, Ti(NO_{3})_{4} is prepared by the nitration of titanium tetrachloride using dinitrogen pentoxide or chlorine nitrate:

TiCl_{4} + 4 N_{2}O_{5} → Ti(NO_{3})_{4} + 4 ClNO_{2}

Hydrated titanium nitrate, the nitrate salt of the aquo complex [Ti(H_{2}O)_{6}]^{3+}, is produced upon dissolution of titanium compounds in nitric acid.

== Structure ==
The complex has D_{2d} symmetry, with four bidentate nitrate ligands. The N-O distances are 1·29 Å and 1·185 Å (noncoordinated).

== Physical properties ==
In the infrared spectrum, it absorbs strongly at 1635 cm^{−1}, assigned to a N-O vibrational mode.

It is soluble in nonpolar solvents silicon tetrachloride and carbon tetrachloride.

== Reactions ==
Titanium nitrate is hygroscopic, converting to ill-defined hydrates. The anhydrous material is highly reactive, even toward hydrocarbons. Titanium nitrate also reacts with n-dodecane, p-dichlorobenzene, anisole, and biphenyl.

It decomposes thermally to titanium dioxide.

== Other reading ==
- Partington, J. R.; A. L. Whynes (1949). "660. Reactions of nitrosyl chloride. Part II". Journal of the Chemical Society (Resumed): 3135. doi:10.1039/JR9490003135. ISSN 0368-1769.
- Dauerman, L.; G.E. Salser (1973). "Mass spectra of covalent inorganic nitrates: copper(II) nitrate and titanium(IV) nitrate". Journal of Inorganic and Nuclear Chemistry. 35 (1): 304–306. doi:10.1016/0022-1902(73)80643-8. ISSN 0022-1902.
