= Hafnium(IV) perchlorate =

Names
- Other names: Hafnium perchlorate; Tetrakis(perchlorato)hafnium(IV)

Identifiers
CAS Number	69807-94-9
3D model (JSmol)	Interactive image
PubChem CID	159579393
- InChI: InChI=1S/4ClHO4.Hf/c4*2-1(3,4)5;/h4*(H,2,3,4,5);/q;;;;+4/p-4 Key: MIUYJIDYPIERRC-UHFFFAOYSA-J
- SMILES: [Hf](O[Cl](=O)(=O)=O)(O[Cl](=O)(=O)=O)(O[Cl](=O)(=O)=O)O[Cl](=O)(=O)=O

Properties
Chemical formula	Hf(ClO_{4})_{4}
Molar mass	576.30 g/mol
Appearance	Crystalline solid

Structure
Crystal structure	Monoclinic

Related compounds
Related compounds	zirconium perchlorate, titanium perchlorate
- Except where otherwise noted, data are given for materials in their standard state (at 25 °C [77 °F], 100 kPa). Infobox references

Hafnium(IV) perchlorate is an inorganic compound of hafnium and perchlorate with the formula Hf(ClO_{4})_{4}. Unlike most simple perchlorate salts, anhydrous Hf(ClO_{4})_{4} is a volatile molecular perchlorato complex in which the perchlorate groups coordinate directly to Hf(IV).

== Preparation ==
Anhydrous hafnium(IV) perchlorate can be prepared by reacting hafnium(IV) chloride with a strongly anhydrous perchlorating medium containing dichlorine heptoxide.

The use of strongly dehydrating perchlorating reagents is necessary because hydrolysis of Hf^{4+} otherwise favors formation of oxo- and hydroxo-containing hafnium species.

== Properties ==
=== Crystal and molecular structure ===
Solid Hf(ClO_{4})_{4} is monoclinic. In the setting used in the original structure determination, its lattice parameters are a = 12.863(7) Å, b = 13.161(7) Å, c = 7.941(1) Å and γ = 107.68(4)°. The perchlorate groups coordinate to hafnium rather than behaving simply as non-coordinating counterions. Structural and vibrational studies describe them as chelating bidentate ligands, giving Hf an eight-coordinate oxygen environment.

Gas-phase electron diffraction shows that isolated Hf(ClO_{4})_{4} molecules are best described by approximately D_{4} symmetry. Each ClO_{4} group is a distorted tetrahedron and is attached to the central hafnium atom through two oxygen atoms.

=== Volatility and thermal decomposition ===
Hafnium(IV) perchlorate is comparatively volatile for an inorganic hafnium compound and has been reported to sublime under reduced pressure at temperatures around 70 °C. On stronger heating it decomposes rather than boiling unchanged. Thermal decomposition initially produces hafnium oxoperchlorate, HfO(ClO_{4})_{2}, in the approximate range 130–160 °C. Further heating to about 300–325 °C gives hafnium(IV) oxide, HfO_{2}. This stepwise formation of an oxoperchlorate followed by the oxide is analogous to the thermal chemistry of zirconium and titanium perchlorates.

=== Thermochemistry ===
The standard enthalpy of formation of crystalline anhydrous Hf(ClO_{4})_{4} at 298.15 K has been determined calorimetrically as −744.4 ± 2.4 kJ mol^{−1}.

== Safety ==
Anhydrous hafnium(IV) perchlorate is a strongly oxidizing perchlorato complex. Anhydrous inorganic perchlorates can react vigorously with combustible or reducing substances and require careful handling.
