= Manganese(II) perchlorate =

Names
- Other names: Manganous perchlorate; Manganese diperchlorate

Identifiers
CAS Number	13770-16-6
3D model (JSmol)	Interactive image
ChemSpider	146029
EC Number	237-390-9
PubChem CID	166899
- InChI: InChI=1S/2ClHO4.Mn/c2*2-1(3,4)5;/h2*(H,2,3,4,5);/q;;+2/p-2
- SMILES: [O-]Cl(=O)(=O)=O.[O-]Cl(=O)(=O)=O.[Mn+2]

Properties
Chemical formula	Mn(ClO_{4})_{2}
Molar mass	253.84 g/mol
Appearance	White solid (anhydrous); Rose-colored solid (hexahydrate)
Density	2.10 g/cm^{3}
Melting point	150 °C (302 °F; 423 K) (decomposes, hexahydrate)
Solubility in water	292 g/100 mL (25 °C)

Hazards
- GHS labelling
Pictograms	(GHS03: Oxidizing)
Signal word	Danger
NFPA 704 (fire diamond)	1 0 2 OX

Related compounds
Other cations	Iron(II) perchlorate Cobalt(II) perchlorate Nickel(II) perchlorate
- Except where otherwise noted, data are given for materials in their standard state (at 25 °C [77 °F], 100 kPa). Infobox references

Manganese(II) perchlorate is an inorganic chemical compound with the formula Mn(ClO_{4})_{2}. It forms a white-colored anhydrous and a rose-colored hexahydrate, both of which are hygroscopic. As a perchlorate, it is a strong oxidizing agent.

== Production and reactions ==
The hexahydrate can be produced by reacting manganese metal or manganese(II) carbonate with perchloric acid, followed by the evaporation of the solution. The hexahydrate does not dehydrate when heating but instead oxidizes to manganese dioxide at 150 °C.

To produce the anhydrous form, manganese(II) nitrate is reacted with dichlorine hexoxide at 5 °C:

Mn(NO_{3})_{2} + 4 Cl_{2}O_{6} → NO_{2}Mn(ClO_{4})_{3} + NO_{2}ClO_{4} + 4 ClO_{2} + O_{2}

The resulting nitryl salt is subsequently heated at 105 °C in a vacuum to produce the anhydrous perchlorate.

NO_{2}Mn(ClO_{4})_{3} → Mn(ClO_{4})_{2} + NO_{2}ClO_{4}

== Structure ==
The anhydrous form is predicted to be isostructural with cobalt(II) perchlorate, based on the IR spectrum and the Raman spectrum of the compound.

The hexahydrate consists of discrete [Mn(H_{2}O)_{6}]^{2+} octahedra and perchlorate anions with lattice constants a = 7.85 Å, b = 13.60 Å and c = 5.30 Å. The hexahydrate undergoes phase transitions at low temperatures.
