= Hafnium nitrate =

Names
- Other names Hafnium tetranitrate

Identifiers
CAS Number	15509-05-4
3D model (JSmol)	Interactive image
ChemSpider	146363
EC Number	239-536-7
PubChem CID	167292
CompTox Dashboard (EPA)	DTXSID30890759
- InChI: InChI=1S/Hf.4NO3/c;4*2-1(3)4/q+4;4*-1 Key: TZNXTUDMYCRCAP-UHFFFAOYSA-N
- SMILES: [N+](=O)([O-])[O-].[N+](=O)([O-])[O-].[N+](=O)([O-])[O-].[N+](=O)([O-])[O-].[Hf+4]

Properties
Chemical formula	Hf(NO_{3})_{4}
Molar mass	426.53 g/mol
Appearance	White crystals
Solubility in water	moderately soluble

Hazards
- GHS labelling
Pictograms	(GHS03: Oxidizing) (GHS07: Exclamation mark)
Signal word	Danger
Hazard statements	H272, H315, H319, H335
Precautionary statements	P210, P220, P221, P305, P338, P405, P501

Related compounds
Related compounds	Thorium nitrate, Zirconium nitrate, titanium nitrate
- Except where otherwise noted, data are given for materials in their standard state (at 25 °C [77 °F], 100 kPa). Infobox references

Hafnium(IV) nitrate is an inorganic compound, a salt of hafnium and nitric acid with the chemical formula Hf(NO_{3})_{4}.

== Synthesis ==
Hafnium nitrate can be prepared by the reaction of hafnium tetrachloride and dinitrogen pentoxide.

== Properties ==
Hafnium nitrate is slightly volatile, and can be sublimed at 110 °C and 0.1 mmHg. Hafnium nitrate decomposes on heating (≥ 160°C) to HfO(NO_{3})_{2} and then to HfO_{2}.

== Applications ==
Hafnium nitrate can be used for the preparation of materials containing hafnium dioxide.
