= Zirconium perchlorate =

Identifiers
3D model (JSmol)	Interactive image
- InChI: InChI=1S/4ClHO4.Zr/c4*2-1(3,4)5;/h4*(H,2,3,4,5);/q;;;;+4/p-4 Key: MQGNWZLWQBTZJR-UHFFFAOYSA-J
- SMILES: [Zr](O[Cl](=O)(=O)=O)(O[Cl](=O)(=O)=O)(O[Cl](=O)(=O)=O)O[Cl](=O)(=O)=O

Properties
Chemical formula	Cl_{4}O_{16}Zr
Molar mass	489.01 g·mol^{−1}
Appearance	white crystals, deliquescent
Melting point	96 °C (205 °F; 369 K)
Boiling point	decomposition
Solubility in water	decomposition

Related compounds
Other anions	Zirconium nitrate Zirconyl perchlorate
Other cations	Titanium perchlorate Hafnium perchlorate
- Except where otherwise noted, data are given for materials in their standard state (at 25 °C [77 °F], 100 kPa). Infobox references

Zirconium perchlorate is an inorganic compound with the formula Zr(ClO_{4})_{4}. It is a hygroscopic colorless solid that sublimes in a vacuum at 70 °C. These properties show that the compound is covalently bonded molecule, rather than a salt. It is an example of a transition metal perchlorate complex.

== Synthesis and properties ==
It can be formed by treating zirconium tetrachloride with dichlorine hexoxide-perchloric acid mixture at −35 °C.

Zirconium perchlorate reacts irreversibly with most organic compounds but is inert towards carbon tetrachloride, chloroformide. With benzene at -10 °C, crystals of Zr(ClO_{4})_{4}·C_{6}H_{6} are deposited.

Solid zirconium perchlorate undergoes a phase transition around 45 °C before melting between 95.5 and 96.0 °C. Thermolysis near 120 °C gives zirconyl perchlorate. Further heating around 290 °C gives form zirconia and chlorine oxides.

== Structure ==
In the gas phase the Zr(ClO_{4})_{4} molecule has a D_{4} symmetry with eightfold square antiprism oxygen coordination. Each perchorate group is bidentate. The chlorine atoms are in a tetrahedral arrangement around the central zirconium.

In the solid phase, Zr(ClO_{4})_{4} crystals are monoclinic with a=12.899, b=13.188, c=7.937 Å, β=107.91°. There are four molecules per unit cell.

== Related substances ==
Titanium perchlorate and hafnium perchlorate are both known.

Salts of perchloratozirconates and hexaperchloratozirconates have been claimed including the caesium perchloratozirconates CsZr(ClO_{4})_{5}, Cs_{2}Zr(ClO_{4})_{6}, and Cs_{4}Zr(ClO_{4})_{8}.

Zirconyl perchlorates have been claimed in older literature.
