= Hafnium(IV) selenate =

Names
- Other names Hafnium selenate

Identifiers
CAS Number	anhydrous: 22995-91-1; tetrahydrate: 58370-93-7
3D model (JSmol)	anhydrous: Interactive image; tetrahydrate: Interactive image
PubChem CID	anhydrous: 175738103
- InChI: InChI=1S/Hf.2H2O4Se/c;2*1-5(2,3)4/h;2*(H2,1,2,3,4)/q+4;;/p-4 Key: PMDVOARMBBSTQJ-UHFFFAOYSA-J
- SMILES: anhydrous: [Hf+4].[O-][Se](=O)(=O)[O-].[O-][Se]([O-])(=O)=O; tetrahydrate: [Hf+4].[O-][Se](=O)(=O)[O-].[O-][Se]([O-])(=O)=O.O.O.O.O

Properties
Chemical formula	Hf(SeO_{4})_{2}
Molar mass	464.41 g/mol
Appearance	Crystalline solid
Density	3.926 g/cm^{3} (tetrahydrate, 290 K)

Structure
Crystal structure	Orthorhombic (tetrahydrate)
Space group	Fddd, No. 70
Lattice constant	a = 0.56431 nm, b = 1.19463 nm, c = 2.65207 nm
Formula units (Z)	8
- Except where otherwise noted, data are given for materials in their standard state (at 25 °C [77 °F], 100 kPa). Infobox references

Hafnium(IV) selenate is an inorganic compound of hafnium and the selenate ion, with the chemical formula Hf(SeO_{4})_{2}. Both anhydrous and hydrated forms are known; the tetrahydrate Hf(SeO_{4})_{2}·4H_{2}O has been characterized by single-crystal X-ray diffraction.

== Structure and properties ==
Hafnium(IV) selenate tetrahydrate crystallizes in the orthorhombic crystal system, in space group Fddd (No. 70). At 290 K its lattice parameters are a = 5.6431(4) Å, b = 11.9463(6) Å and c = 26.5207(14) Å, with eight formula units per unit cell.

Each Hf^{4+} ion is coordinated by eight oxygen atoms: four from selenate ions and four from coordinated water molecules. The compound is isostructural with Hf(SO_{4})_{2}·4H_{2}O and closely related to Zr(SeO_{4})_{2}·4H_{2}O.

Infrared spectroscopy shows the characteristic vibrational modes of coordinated selenate groups and water. Hirshfeld surface analysis of the tetrahydrate indicates that O-O contacts make the largest contribution to intermolecular interactions in the crystal.

=== Thermal decomposition ===
On heating, the tetrahydrate loses water to form anhydrous Hf(SeO_{4})_{2}. Older thermal studies report dehydration in the approximate range 140–220 °C.

The anhydrous selenate is stable to substantially higher temperature but decomposes at about 610 °C.

== Preparation ==
Hafnium(IV) selenate tetrahydrate can be prepared hydrothermally from hafnium(IV) oxide and concentrated selenic acid. A synthesis at 300 °C for six hours using HfO_{2} and 40% H_{2}SeO_{4} yields Hf(SeO_{4})_{2}·4H_{2}O:

HfO_{2} + 2 H_{2}SeO_{4} + 2 H_{2}O → Hf(SeO_{4})_{2}·4H_{2}O

The tetrahydrate has also been prepared by reaction of selenic acid with saturated solutions of hafnium oxychloride hydrate.
