= Cerium(III) perchlorate =

Names
- Other names Cerous perchlorate

Identifiers
CAS Number	14017-47-1
3D model (JSmol)	Interactive image
ECHA InfoCard	100.034.383
EC Number	237-836-2
PubChem CID	166978
CompTox Dashboard (EPA)	DTXSID70890738
- InChI: InChI=1S/Ce.3ClHO4/c;3*2-1(3,4)5/h;3*(H,2,3,4,5)/q+3;;;/p-3 Key: LJBTWTBUIINKRU-UHFFFAOYSA-K
- SMILES: [Ce+3].[O-]Cl(=O)(=O)=O.[O-]Cl(=O)(=O)=O.[O-]Cl(=O)(=O)=O

Properties
Chemical formula	Ce(ClO_{4})_{3}
Molar mass	438.47 g/mol
Appearance	White crystalline solid (hydrates)
Solubility in water	Soluble in water

Structure
Crystal structure	Hexagonal (anhydrous)
Space group	P6_{3}/m, No. 176
Lattice constant	a = 0.9378 nm, c = 0.5875 nm
Formula units (Z)	2
- Except where otherwise noted, data are given for materials in their standard state (at 25 °C [77 °F], 100 kPa). Infobox references

Cerium(III) perchlorate is an inorganic compound of cerium in the +3 oxidation state and the perchlorate ion, with the formula Ce(ClO_{4})_{3}. It is known in anhydrous form and as several hydrates, including hexa- and nonahydrates. In dilute aqueous solution, Ce^{3+} is present predominantly as the nona-aqua ion [Ce(H_{2}O)_{9}]^{3+}.

== Preparation ==
Hydrated cerium(III) perchlorate can be prepared by reaction of a cerium(III) compound with perchloric acid. For example, the nonahydrate has been prepared from cerium(III) chloride and perchloric acid, followed by repeated crystallization from water.

Anhydrous Ce(ClO_{4})_{3} can be obtained by stepwise vacuum dehydration of the nonahydrate. In one procedure, Ce(ClO_{4})_{3}·9H_{2}O was heated successively at 80–90 °C, 120–130 °C and finally 165–170 °C.

Anhydrous cerium(III) perchlorate can also be prepared by reaction of anhydrous cerium(III) chloride with nearly water-free perchloric acid containing chlorine(VII) oxide.

== Properties ==
=== Anhydrous structure ===
Anhydrous Ce(ClO_{4})_{3} crystallizes in the hexagonal crystal system, space group P6_{3}/m (No. 176), with two formula units per unit cell. Its lattice parameters are a = 9.378(1) Å, c = 5.875(1) Å. The structure belongs to the common anhydrous rare-earth perchlorate family extending across much of the lanthanide series. Cerium is nine-coordinate, with oxygen atoms supplied by tridentate perchlorate groups, producing a three-dimensional channel-containing framework.

=== Hydrates ===
Several hydrated forms are known. Commercial and preparative material is often encountered as the hexahydrate, Ce(ClO_{4})_{3}·6H_{2}O, while a nonahydrate has also been characterized in thermal studies.

Stepwise dehydration of the nonahydrate produces lower hydrates. Under vacuum, intermediate compositions corresponding approximately to the tetrahydrate and dihydrate are formed before complete dehydration at about 165–170 °C.

=== Aqueous solution ===
Raman spectroscopy shows that in dilute aqueous cerium(III) perchlorate solutions the dominant hydrated cation is [Ce(H_{2}O)_{9}]^{3+}.

At low concentration, perchlorate remains mainly outside the first coordination sphere. At concentrations above roughly 1.5 mol/L, outer-sphere and contact ion pairs become increasingly important.

In molten Ce(ClO_{4})_{3}·6H_{2}O at 161 °C, direct Ce–perchlorate coordination becomes prominent because there is insufficient water to maintain a complete nona-aqua hydration shell.

=== Thermal decomposition ===
Anhydrous Ce(ClO_{4})_{3} is strongly hygroscopic and decomposes on heating rather than boiling unchanged.

Thermal decomposition occurs mainly between about 240 and 420 °C. The first major decomposition step has a maximum rate near 260–265 °C and appears to proceed by parallel pathways, one producing cerium(IV) oxide directly and another forming an unstable intermediate tentatively assigned as a cerium oxoperchlorate.

At higher temperature, the intermediate decomposes further to CeO_{2}. Heating the nonahydrate to 460 °C produces nanocrystalline cerium dioxide with an average crystallite size of about 13 nm.

Gaseous decomposition products include oxygen and chlorine-containing species.

== Coordination chemistry ==
Cerium(III) perchlorate is used as a soluble source of Ce^{3+} in coordination chemistry. Perchlorate generally coordinates weakly in aqueous solution, making the salt useful when a relatively non-competing counterion is required.

Complexes with crown ethers have been reported, including derivatives of dibromobenzo-15-crown-5.

== Safety ==
Cerium(III) perchlorate is an oxidizing perchlorate salt. Anhydrous material in particular should be kept away from combustible and strongly reducing substances.
