= Titanium perchlorate =

Titanium(IV) perchlorate
- titanium perchlorate

Identifiers
CAS Number	60580-20-3; 13498-15-2
3D model (JSmol)	Interactive image
PubChem CID	14795113
- InChI: InChI=1S/4ClHO4.Ti/c4*2-1(3,4)5;/h4*(H,2,3,4,5);/q;;;;+4/p-4 Key: SOCDLWOJPVKBHF-UHFFFAOYSA-J
- SMILES: [Ti](O[Cl](=O)(=O)=O)(O[Cl](=O)(=O)=O)(O[Cl](=O)(=O)=O)O[Cl](=O)(=O)=O

Properties
Chemical formula	Ti(ClO_{4})_{4}
Molar mass	445.65 g·mol^{−1}
Appearance	white crystals, deliquescent
Density	2.49 g/cm^{3} (anhydrous)
Melting point	85 °C (185 °F; 358 K) (anhydrous) slight decomposition
Boiling point	decomposition
Solubility in water	high

Related compounds
Other anions	Titanium nitrate
Other cations	Zirconium perchlorate Hafnium perchlorate
- Except where otherwise noted, data are given for materials in their standard state (at 25 °C [77 °F], 100 kPa). Infobox references

Titanium perchlorate, or more precisely titanium(IV) perchlorate, is a molecular compound of titanium and perchlorate groups with formula Ti(ClO_{4})_{4}. Anhydrous titanium perchlorate decomposes explosively at 130 °C and melts at 85 °C with slight decomposition. It sublimes in a vacuum as low as 70 °C. Being a molecular with four perchlorate ligands, it is an unusual example of a transition metal perchlorate complex.

== Properties ==
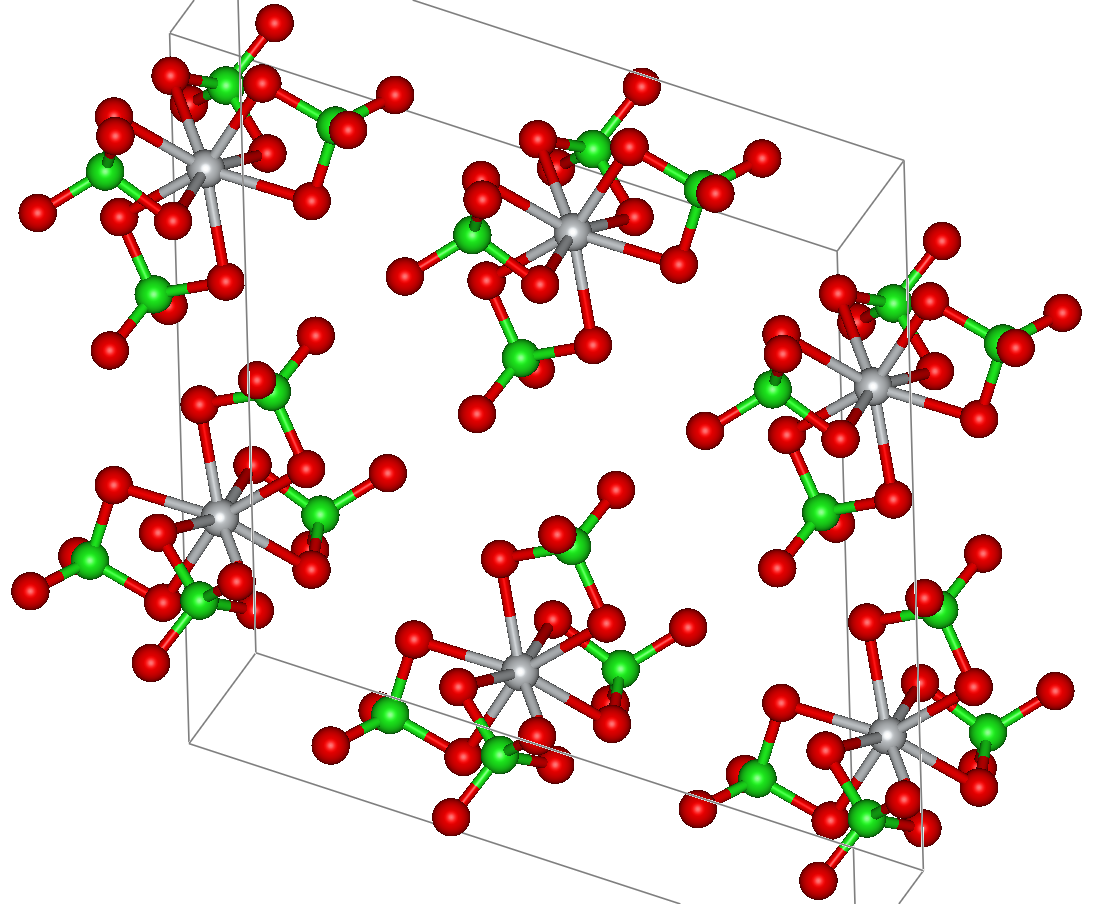
packing of Ti(ClO_{4})_{4} molecules in the crystal.

In Ti(ClO_{4})_{4}, the four perchlorate groups binds as bidentate ligands. Thus the Ti center is bound to eight oxygen atoms. So the molecule could also be called tetrakis(perchlorato-O,O')titanium(IV).

In the solid form it forms monoclinic crystals, with unit cell parameters a=12.451 b=7.814 c=12.826 Å α=108.13. Unit cell volume is 1186 Å^{3} at -100 °C. There are four molecules per unit cell.

It reacts with petrolatum, nitromethane, acetonitrile, dimethylformamide, and over 25 °C with carbon tetrachloride.

Titanyl perchlorate form solvates with water, dimethyl sulfoxide, dioxane, pyridine-N-oxide, and quinoline-N-oxide.

Thermolysis of titanium perchlorate gives TiO_{2}, ClO_{2} and dioxygen O_{2} The titanyl species TiO(ClO_{4})_{2} is an intermediate in this decomposition.

Ti(ClO_{4})_{4} → TiO_{2} + 4ClO_{2} + 3O_{2} ΔH = +6 kcal/mol (25 kJ/mol).

== Formation ==
Titanium perchlorate can be formed by reacting titanium tetrachloride with perchloric acid enriched in dichlorine heptoxide. Another way uses titanium tetrachloride with dichlorine hexoxide. This forms a complex with Cl_{2}O_{6} which when warmed to 55 °C in a vacuum, sublimes and can crystallise the pure anhydrous product from the vapour.

== Related ==
In the salt dicaesium hexaperchloratotitanate, Cs_{2}Ti(ClO_{4})_{6} the perchlorate groups are monodentate, connected by one oxygen to titanium.

Titanium perchlorate can also form complexes with other ligands bound to the titanium atom including binol, and gluconic acid.

A polymeric oxychlorperchlorato compound of titanium, Ti_{6}O_{4}Cl_{x}(ClO_{4})_{16−x}, is made from excess TiCl_{4} and dichlorine hexoxide. This has a varying composition, and ranges from light to dark yellow.
