= Zirconium nitrate =

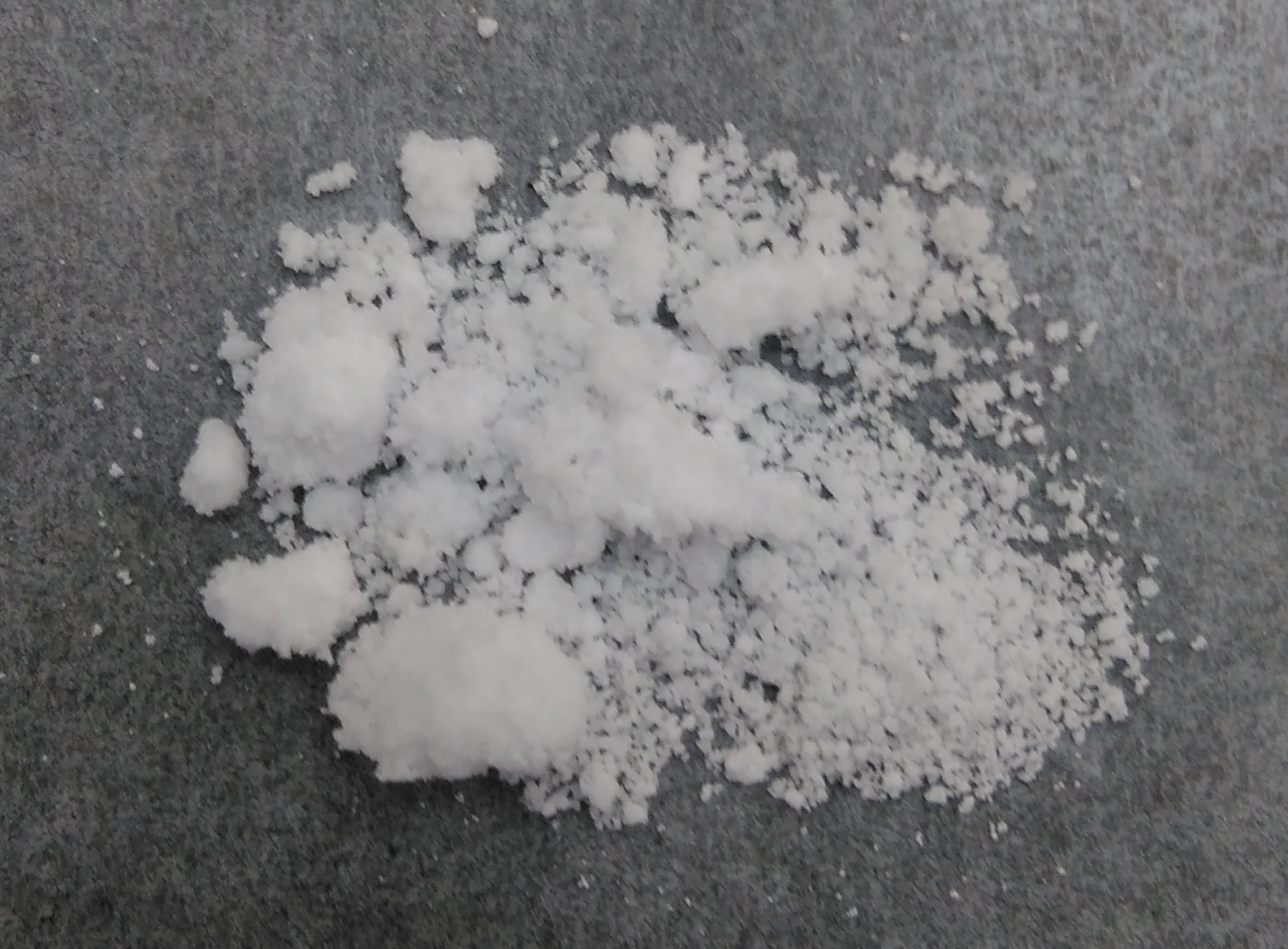
- Pentahydrate

Names
- Other names zirconium tetranitrate, tetranitratozirconium, zirconium(4+) tetranitrate, zirconium(IV) nitrate

Identifiers
CAS Number	13746-89-9
3D model (JSmol)	Interactive image
ChemSpider	24459
ECHA InfoCard	100.033.917
PubChem CID	26251
UNII	L68X591SNQ
CompTox Dashboard (EPA)	DTXSID9049821
- InChI: InChI=1S/4NO3.Zr/c4*2-1(3)4;/q4*-1;+4 Key: OERNJTNJEZOPIA-UHFFFAOYSA-N
- SMILES: [Zr+4].O=[N+]([O-])[O-].[O-][N+]([O-])=O.[O-][N+]([O-])=O.[O-][N+]([O-])=O

Properties
Chemical formula	Zr(NO_{3})_{4}
Molar mass	339.243591 g/mol
Appearance	transparent plates
Melting point	58.5 °C
Boiling point	decompose 100 °C
Solubility in water	water, ethanol

Hazards
- Occupational safety and health (OHS/OSH)
Main hazards	oxidiser
- Lethal dose or concentration (LD, LC)
LC_{Lo} (lowest published)	500 mg/m^{3} (rat, 30 min)

Related compounds
Related compounds	Zirconyl nitrate, hafnium nitrate, titanium nitrate, zirconium perchlorate
- Except where otherwise noted, data are given for materials in their standard state (at 25 °C [77 °F], 100 kPa). Infobox references

Zirconium nitrate is a volatile anhydrous transition metal nitrate salt of zirconium with formula Zr(NO_{3})_{4}. It has alternate names of zirconium tetranitrate, or zirconium(IV) nitrate.

== Formation ==
The anhydrous salt can be made from zirconium tetrachloride reacting with dinitrogen pentoxide.

ZrCl_{4} + 4 N_{2}O_{5} → Zr(NO_{3})_{4} + 4ClNO_{2}

The product can be purified by sublimation in a vacuum. A contaminating substance in this is nitronium pentanitratozirconate. (NO_{2})Zr(NO_{3})_{5}.

Zirconium nitrate pentahydrate Zr(NO_{3})_{4}·5H_{2}O can be formed by dissolving zirconium dioxide in nitric acid and then evaporating the solution until it is dry. However it is easier to crystallise zirconyl nitrate trihydrate ZrO(NO_{3})_{2}·3H_{2}O from such a solution.

Zirconium is highly resistant to nitric acid even in the presence of other impurities and high temperatures. So zirconium nitrate is not made by dissolving zirconium metal in nitric acid.

== Properties ==
Zirconium nitrate pentahydrate dissolves easily in water and alcohol. It is acidic in aqueous solution, and a base such as ammonium hydroxide will cause zirconium hydroxide to precipitate. The pentahydrate crystals have a refractive index of 1.6.

== Related substances ==
Related substances are zirconium nitrate complexes. Zr(NO_{3})_{3}(H_{2}O)^{+}_{3} has a tricapped trigonal prismatic structure, with the nitrates connected by two oxygen atoms each (bidentate). The pentanitrato complex Zr(NO_{3})^{−}_{5} has all the nitrate groups bidentate, and has a bicapped square antiprism shape.

NO_{2}[Zr(NO_{3})_{3}·3H_{2}O]_{2}(NO_{3})_{3} crystallizes in the hexagonal system, space group P3̅c1, with unit cell dimensions a = 10.292 Å, b = 10.292 Å, c = 14.84 Å, volume 1632.2 Å^{3} with 2 formulae per unit cell, density = 2.181.

CsZr(NO_{3})_{5} crystallizes in the monoclinic system, space group P2_{1}/n, with unit cell dimensions a = 7.497 Å, b = 11.567 Å, c = 14.411 Å, β=96.01°, volume 1242.8 Å^{3} with 4 formulae per cell, density = 2.855.

(NH_{4})Zr(NO_{3})_{5}·HNO_{3} crystallizes in the orthorhombic system, space group Pna2_{1} with unit cell dimensions a=14.852 Å, b = 7.222 Å, c = 13.177 Å, volume 1413.6 Å^{3} with 4 formulae per cell, density = 2.267.

A mixed nitronium, nitrosonium pentanitratozirconate crystallizing in the tetragonal system also exists.

== Use ==
Zirconium nitrate is manufactured by a number of chemical suppliers. It is used as a source of zirconium for other salts, as an analytical standard, or as a preservative. Zirconium nitrate and nitronium pentanitratozirconate can be used as chemical vapour deposition precursors as they are volatile, and decompose above 100 °C to form zirconia. At 95 °C, zirconium nitrate sublimes with a pressure of 0.2 mm of Hg and can be deposited as zirconium dioxide on silicon at 285 °C. It has the advantage in that it is a single source, meaning it does not have to be mixed with other materials like oxygen, and decomposes at a relatively low temperature, and does not contaminate the surface with other elements such as hydrogen or fluorine.

Zirconium free from hafnium is required for nuclear reactor construction. One way to achieve this is via a mixed aqueous solution of hafnium nitrate and zirconium nitrate, which can be separated by partitioning the zirconium into tributylphosphate dissolved in kerosene.

Zirconium nitrate can be used as a Lewis acid catalyst in the formation of N-substituted pyrroles.

Anhydrous zirconium nitrate can nitrate some organic aromatic compounds in an unusual way. Quinoline is nitrated to 3-nitroquinoline and 7-nitroquinoline. Pyridine is nitrated to 3-nitropyridine and 4-nitropyridine.
