= Palladium(II) perchlorate =

Names
- Systematic IUPAC name Palladium(II) diperchlorate
- Other names: Palladium diperchlorate

Identifiers
3D model (JSmol)	Interactive image
PubChem CID	20221938
- InChI: InChI=1S/2ClHO4.Pd/c2*2-1(3,4)5;/h2*(H,2,3,4,5);/q;;+2/p-2 Key: RIGGZOJUCCUJIM-UHFFFAOYSA-L
- SMILES: [O-]Cl(=O)(=O)=O.[O-]Cl(=O)(=O)=O.[Pd+2]

Properties
Chemical formula	Pd(ClO_{4})_{2}
Molar mass	305.32 g/mol
Appearance	Light-brown solid
Solubility in water	Soluble
- Except where otherwise noted, data are given for materials in their standard state (at 25 °C [77 °F], 100 kPa). Infobox references

Palladium(II) perchlorate is an inorganic chemical compound with the formula Pd(ClO_{4})_{2}. It is a light-brown solid.

== Structure ==
Solid anhydrous palladium(II) perchlorate consists of a pair of bidentate perchlorate ligands attached to the central palladium atom.

== Preparation ==
Palladium(II) perchlorate is produced by the reaction of dichlorine hexoxide and palladium(II) chloride followed by heating at 60 °C in a vacuum:

3 PdCl_{2} + 4 Cl_{2}O_{6} → 3 Pd(ClO_{4})_{2} + 4 Cl_{2}

Aqueous solutions of palladium(II) perchlorate can be produced by the addition of perchloric acid to a solution of palladium(II) nitrate.
