= Nickel(II) titanate =

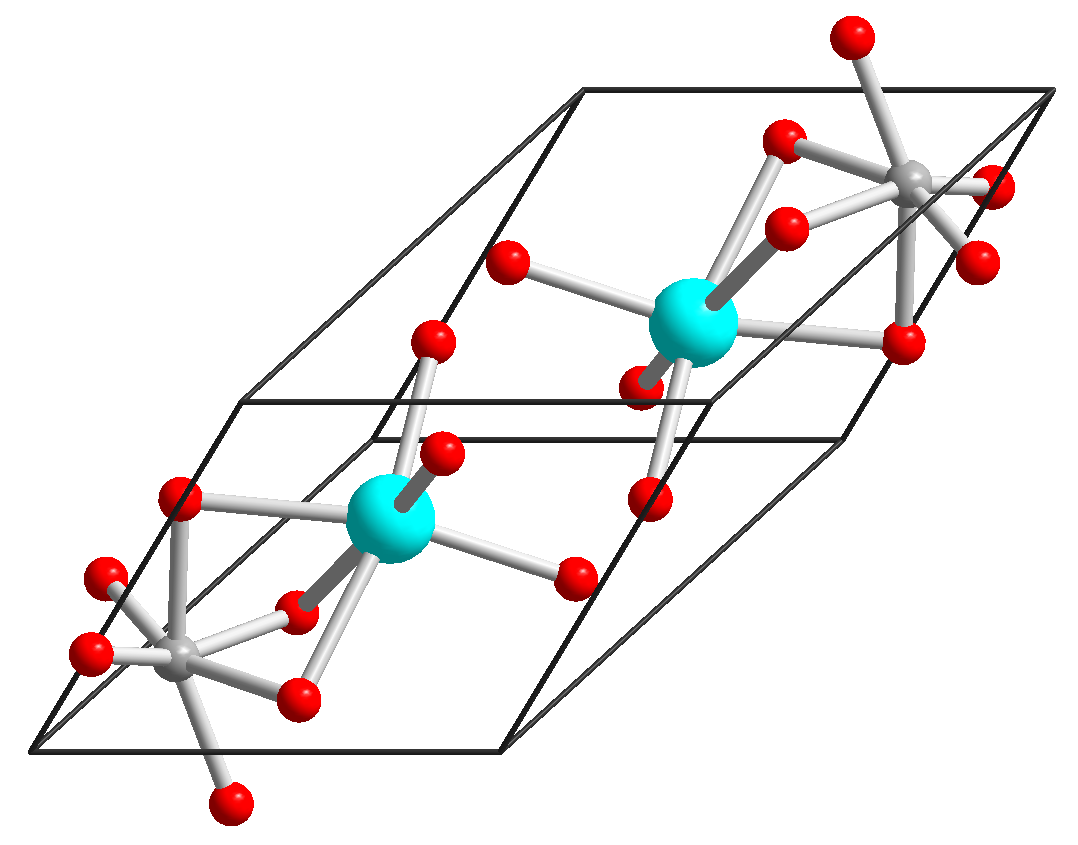

Names
- IUPAC name Nickel(IV) titanate
- Other names: Nickel titanium oxide; Nickel titanium trioxide; Titanium nickel oxide

Identifiers
CAS Number	12035-39-1
3D model (JSmol)	Interactive image
ChemSpider	145869
ECHA InfoCard	100.031.647
EC Number	234-825-4
PubChem CID	166728
RTECS number	QS0635000
CompTox Dashboard (EPA)	DTXSID7093959
- InChI: InChI=1S/Ni.3O.Ti/q+2;3*-2;+4 Key: KJLFZWJDCDJCFB-UHFFFAOYSA-N
- SMILES: [O-2].[O-2].[O-2].[Ti+4].[Ni+2]

Properties
Chemical formula	NiTiO_{3}
Molar mass	154.61 g/mol
Appearance	yellow powder
Density	4.44 g/cm^{3}
Solubility in water	0.0396 g/100 mL

Hazards
- GHS labelling
Pictograms	(GHS07: Exclamation mark) (GHS08: Health hazard)
Signal word	Danger
Hazard statements	H317, H350i, H372
Precautionary statements	P203, P260, P264, P270, P272, P280, P302+P352, P318, P319, P321, P333+P317, P362+P364, P405, P501
NFPA 704 (fire diamond)	3 0 0
- Except where otherwise noted, data are given for materials in their standard state (at 25 °C [77 °F], 100 kPa). Infobox references

Nickel(II) titanate is an inorganic compound with the chemical formula NiTiO_{3}. It is a coordination compound between nickel(II), titanium(IV) and oxide ions. It has the appearance of a yellow powder.

== Structure ==
Nickel(II) titanate crystallizes at 600 °C and is stable at room temperature and normal pressure in an ilmenite structure with rhombohedral R3 symmetry. It consists of alternating layers of Ni and Ti along the rhombohedral axis with O layers between them.

Another description of nickel(II) titanite's illemite structure consists of a pseudo close packed hexagonal array of O^{2−} ions with two thirds occupied by an ordered hexagonal like cation. The average crystallite's size was estimated at 42 nm with lattice constants of a = 5.032 Å, b = 5.032 Å, c = 4.753 Å.

== Preparation ==
Nickel(II) titanate can be prepared by the autocombustion of a mixture of titanium isopropoxide, nickel(II) nitrate (oxidizer), and alanine (fuel) in isopropyl alcohol solution. The resulting dark green product is then calcined.

Another method involves heating NiO and TiO_{2} at 1350 °C for three hours.

NiO + TiO_{2} → NiTiO_{3}

NiTiO_{3} residue is formed in the thermal decomposition of the heterobimetallic complex Ni_{2}Ti_{2}(OEt)_{2}(μ-OEt)_{6}(2,4-pentanedionate)_{4}.

== Applications ==
Nickel(II) titanate is used as a yellow pigment. It has been used as a catalyst for toluene oxidation.

It is of research interest as an electronic material due to its high dielectric constant (40), weak magnetism, and semiconductivity. It has received attention as a possible candidate for multiferroic materials capable of magnetization through the application of an electric field.
