= Nickel(II) phosphate =

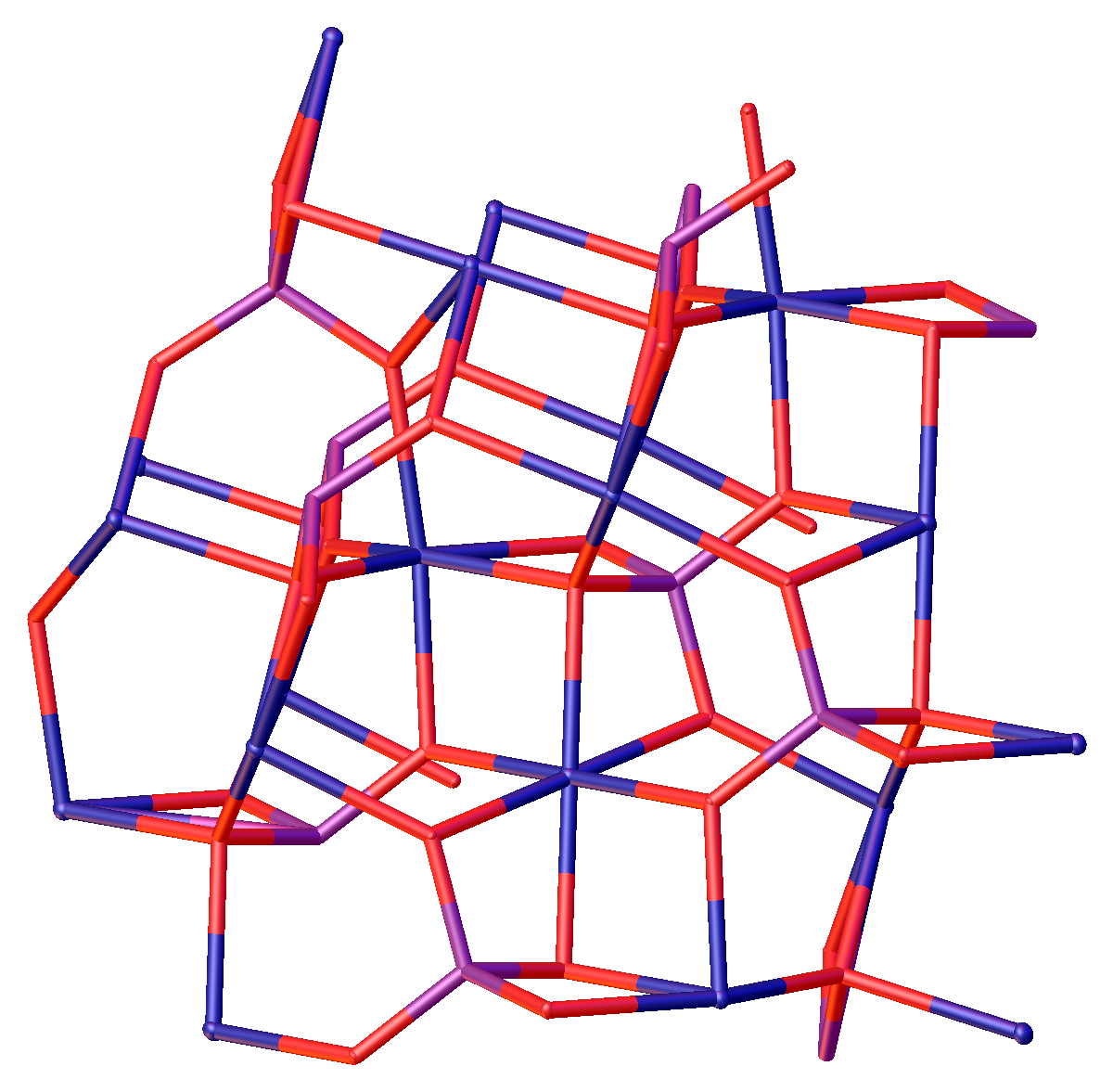

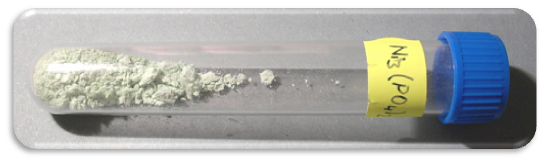

Names
- IUPAC name Nickel(2+) diphosphate
- Other names Nickel(III) phosphate, nickel diphosphate

Identifiers
CAS Number	10381-36-9
3D model (JSmol)	Interactive image
ChemSpider	145362
ECHA InfoCard	100.030.755
EC Number	233-844-5
PubChem CID	165868
UNII	S0S2HKR70L
CompTox Dashboard (EPA)	DTXSID20889591
- InChI: InChI=1S/3Ni.2H3O4P/c;;;2*1-5(2,3)4/h;;;2*(H3,1,2,3,4)/q3*+2;;/p-6 Key: AFYAQDWVUWAENU-UHFFFAOYSA-H
- SMILES: [O-]P(=O)([O-])[O-].[O-]P(=O)([O-])[O-].[Ni+2].[Ni+2].[Ni+2]

Properties
Chemical formula	Ni_{3}(PO_{4})_{2}
Molar mass	366.022924 g/mol
Appearance	Green solid
Density	4.38 g/cm^{3}
Solubility product (K_{sp})	4.74×10^{−32}

Structure
Crystal structure	Monoclinic, mP26
Space group	P2_{1}/c, No. 14
Lattice constant	a = 0.58273 nm, b = 0.46964 nm, c = 1.01059 nm α = 90°, β = 91.138°, γ = 90°

Hazards
- GHS labelling
Pictograms	(GHS07: Exclamation mark) (GHS08: Health hazard) (GHS09: Environmental hazard)
Signal word	Danger
Hazard statements	H317, H334, H372, H410
Precautionary statements	P203, P260, P264, P270, P272, P273, P280, P284, P302+P352, P304+P340, P318, P319, P321, P333+P317, P342+P316, P362+P364, P391, P405, P501
NFPA 704 (fire diamond)	2 0 0
Safety data sheet (SDS)	www.fishersci.com
- Except where otherwise noted, data are given for materials in their standard state (at 25 °C [77 °F], 100 kPa). Infobox references

Nickel(II) phosphate is an inorganic compound with the formula Ni_{3}(PO_{4})_{2}. It is a mint green paramagnetic solid that is insoluble in water.

== Hydrated nickel(II) phosphate ==
The hydrate Ni_{3}(PO_{4})_{2}·8(H_{2}O) is a light green solid, which can be prepared by hydrothermal synthesis and also occurs as the mineral arupite. It features octahedral Ni centers, which are bound to water and phosphate.

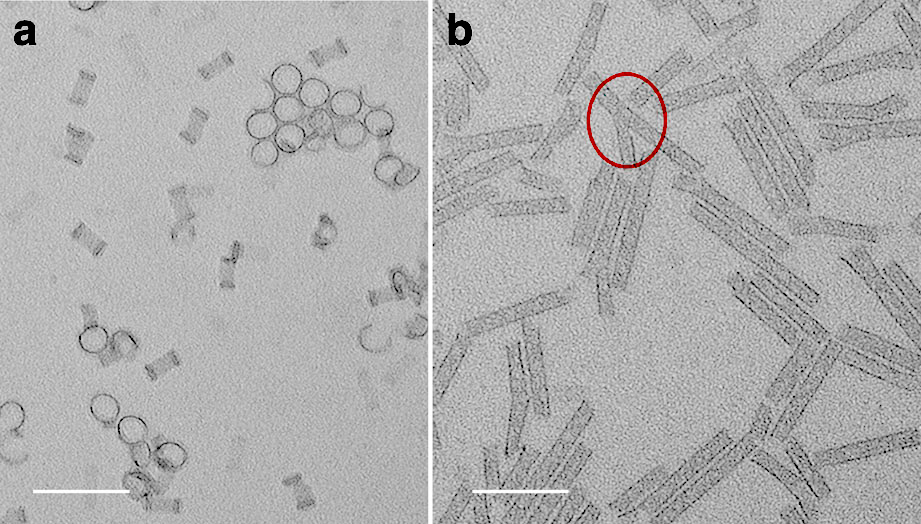
Ni phosphate nanorings and nanotubes. Scale bar 50 nm.
