= Cobalt(II) perchlorate =

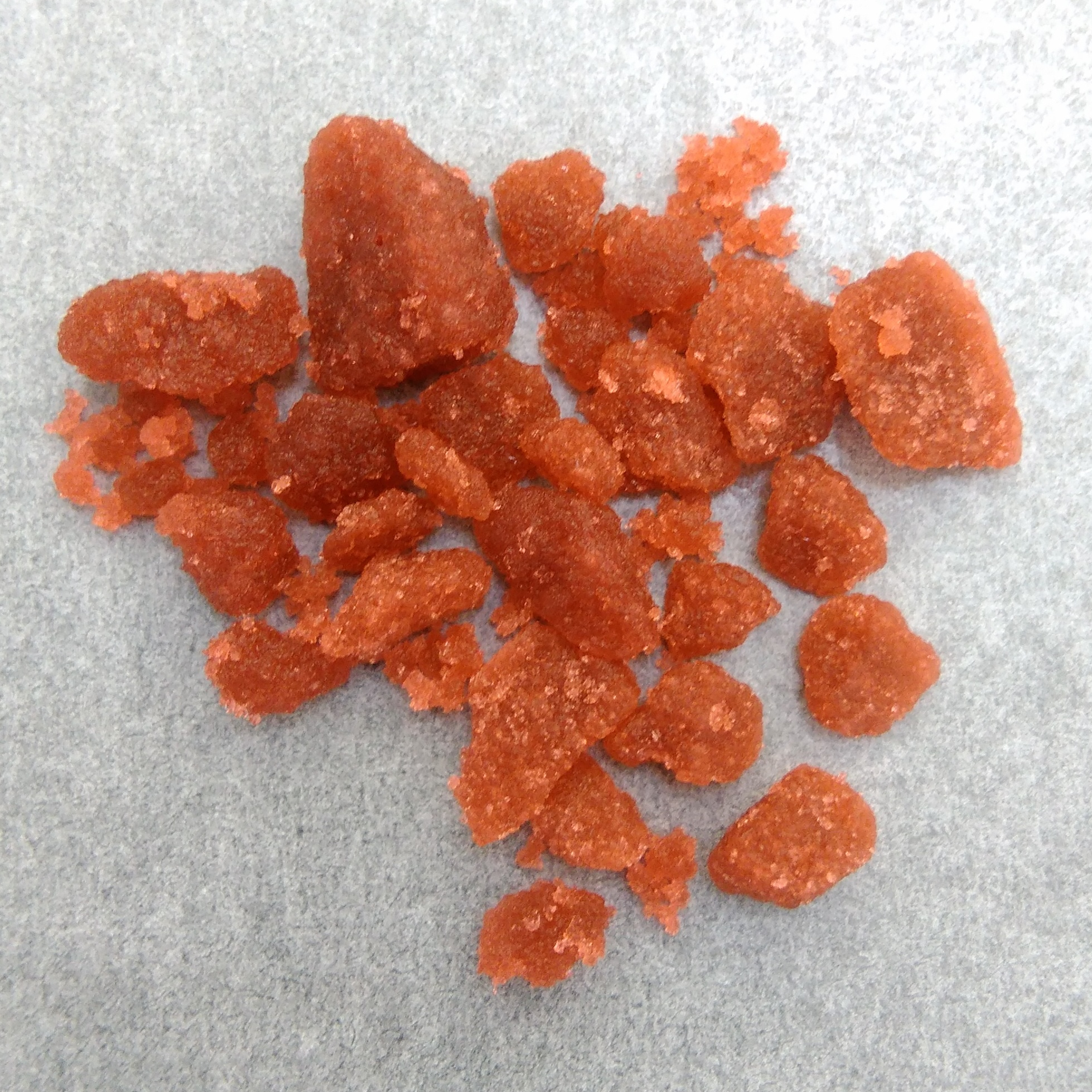
- Hexahydrate

Names
- Systematic IUPAC name Cobalt(II) diperchlorate
- Other names: Cobaltous perchlorate; Cobalt diperchlorate

Identifiers
| CAS Number | 13455-31-7 |
| 3D model (JSmol) | Interactive image; hexahydrate: Interactive image |
| ChemSpider | 24278 |
| ECHA InfoCard | 100.033.307 |
| EC Number | 236-653-5 |
| PubChem CID | 26064 |
| CompTox Dashboard (EPA) | DTXSID2094003 |
- InChI: InChI=1S/2ClHO4.Co/c2*2-1(3,4)5;/h2*(H,2,3,4,5);/q;;+2/p-2 Key: BSUSEPIPTZNHMN-UHFFFAOYSA-L; hexahydrate: InChI=1S/2ClHO4.Co.6H2O/c2*2-1(3,4)5;;;;;;;/h2*(H,2,3,4,5);;6*1H2/q;;+2;;;;;;/p-2 Key: KPOBHNYTWJSVKF-UHFFFAOYSA-
- SMILES: [O-]Cl(=O)(=O)=O.[O-]Cl(=O)(=O)=O.[Co+2]; hexahydrate: [O-]Cl(=O)(=O)=O.[O-]Cl(=O)(=O)=O.[Co+2].O.O.O.O.O.O

Properties
| Chemical formula | Co(ClO_{4})_{2} |
| Molar mass | 257.83 g/mol |
| Appearance | Pink solid (anhydrous); Dark-red crystals (hexahydrate) |
| Density | 3.33 g/cm^{3} |
| Melting point | 170 °C (338 °F; 443 K) (decomposition, hexahydrate) |
| Solubility in water | 113 g/100 mL (25 °C) |
| Solubility | Insoluble in ethanol and acetone |

Hazards
- GHS labelling
| Pictograms | (GHS03: Oxidizing) (GHS07: Exclamation mark) (GHS08: Health hazard) |
| Signal word | Danger |
| NFPA 704 (fire diamond) | 2 0 1 OX |
| Safety data sheet (SDS) | Fisher SDS |

Related compounds
| Other cations | Iron(II) perchlorate Nickel(II) perchlorate |
- Except where otherwise noted, data are given for materials in their standard state (at 25 °C [77 °F], 100 kPa). Infobox references

Cobalt(II) perchlorate is an inorganic chemical compound with the formula Co(ClO_{4})_{2}·nH_{2}O (n = 0,6). The pink anhydrous and red hexahydrate forms are both hygroscopic solids.

== Structure ==
The anhydrous form consists of octahedral Co(ClO_{4})_{6} centers, with tridentate perchlorate ligands. On the other hand, the orthorhombic hexahydrate consists of isolated [Co(H_{2}O)_{6}]^{2+} octahedra and perchlorate anions with lattice constants a = 7.76 Å, b = 13.44 Å and c = 5.20 Å. The hexahydrate undergoes phase transitions at low temperatures.

== Preparation and reactions ==
Cobalt(II) perchlorate hexahydrate is produced by reacting cobalt metal or cobalt(II) carbonate with perchloric acid, followed by the evaporation of the solution:

CoCO_{3} + 2 HClO_{4} → Co(ClO_{4})_{2} + H_{2}O + CO_{2}

The anhydrous form cannot be produced from the hexahydrate by heating, as it instead decomposes to cobalt(II,III) oxide at 170 °C. Instead, anhydrous cobalt(II) perchlorate is produced from the reaction of dichlorine hexoxide and cobalt(II) chloride, followed by heating in a vacuum at 75 °C.
