= Nickel(II) carbonate =

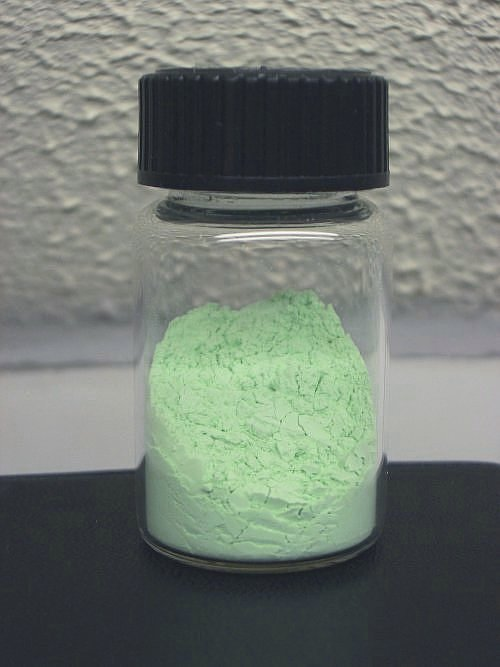
- Nickel(II) carbonate Basic nickel carbonate

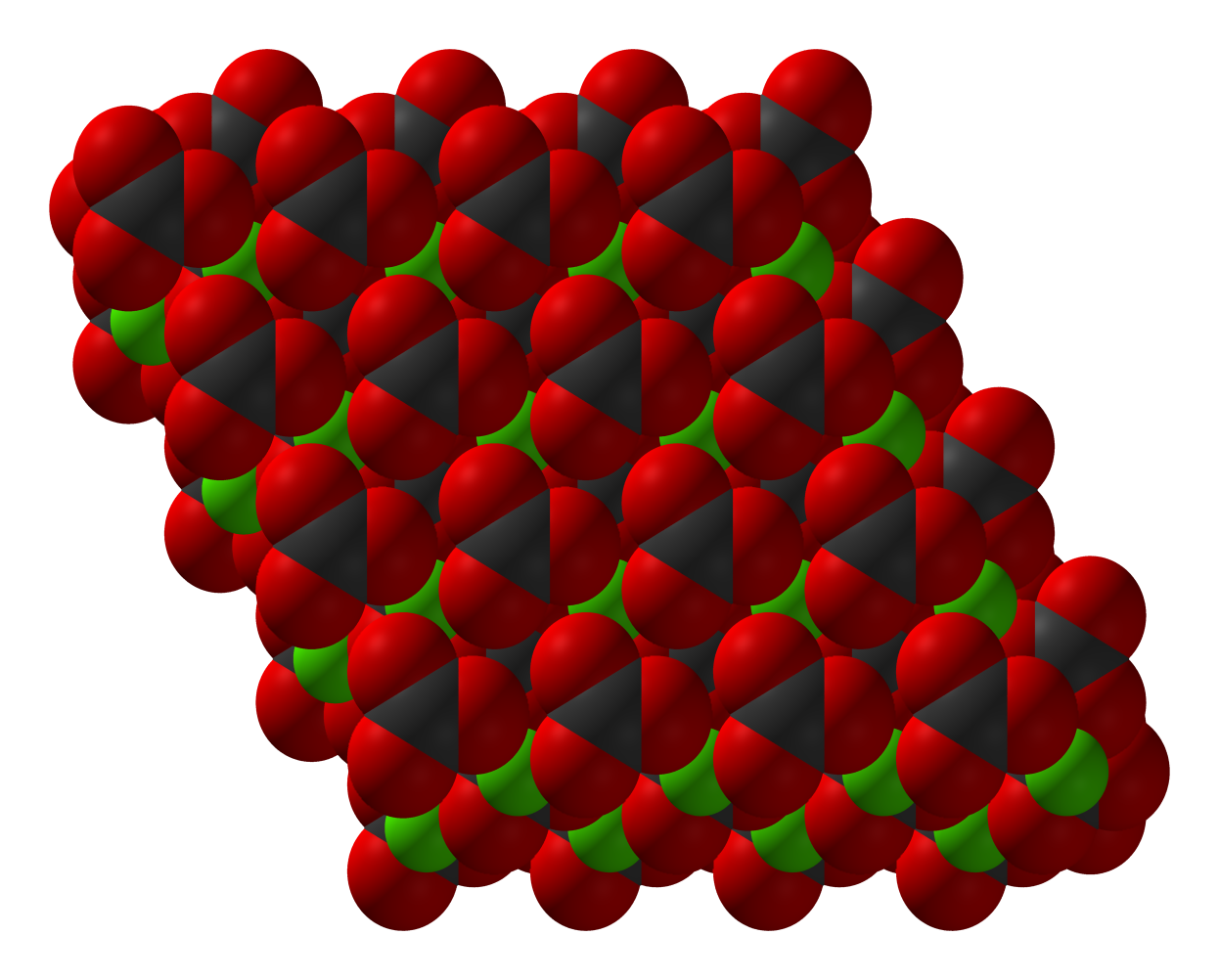

Names
- IUPAC name Nickel(II) carbonate
- Other names Nickelous carbonate

Identifiers
CAS Number	3333-67-3; 29863-10-3 (Ni_{4}CO_{3}(OH)_{6}(H_{2}O)_{4})
3D model (JSmol)	Interactive image
ChemSpider	17701
ECHA InfoCard	100.020.063
EC Number	222-068-2
PubChem CID	18746
RTECS number	QR6200000
UN number	3288
CompTox Dashboard (EPA)	DTXSID201333983 DTXSID3025708, DTXSID201333983
- InChI: InChI=1S/CH2O3.Ni/c2-1(3)4;/h(H2,2,3,4);/q;+2/p-2 Key: ZULUUIKRFGGGTL-UHFFFAOYSA-L; InChI=1/CH2O3.Ni/c2-1(3)4;/h(H2,2,3,4);/q;+2/p-2 Key: ZULUUIKRFGGGTL-NUQVWONBAN
- SMILES: [Ni+2].[O-]C([O-])=O

Properties
Chemical formula	NiCO_{3}
Molar mass	118.7
Appearance	light green powder
Density	4.39 g/cm^{3}
Melting point	205 °C (401 °F; 478 K) decomposes
Solubility in water	0.0093 g/100ml
Solubility product (K_{sp})	6.6·10^{−9}

Structure
Crystal structure	rhombohedral

Hazards
- GHS labelling
Pictograms	(GHS07: Exclamation mark) (GHS08: Health hazard)
Signal word	Danger
Hazard statements	H302, H312, H315, H317, H319, H332, H334, H335, H350
Precautionary statements	P201, P261, P280, P305+P351+P338, P308+P313
NFPA 704 (fire diamond)	2 0 0
- Lethal dose or concentration (LD, LC)
LD_{50} (median dose)	840 mg/kg
Safety data sheet (SDS)	ICSC 0927
- Except where otherwise noted, data are given for materials in their standard state (at 25 °C [77 °F], 100 kPa). verify (what is ?) Infobox references

Nickel(II) carbonate describes one or a mixture of inorganic compounds containing nickel and carbonate. From the industrial perspective, an important nickel carbonate is basic nickel carbonate with the formula Ni_{4}CO_{3}(OH)_{6}(H_{2}O)_{4}. Simpler carbonates, ones more likely encountered in the laboratory, are NiCO_{3} and its hexahydrate. All are paramagnetic green solids containing Ni^{2+} cations. The basic carbonate is an intermediate in the hydrometallurgical purification of nickel from its ores and is used in electroplating of nickel.

== Preparation ==
The hexahydrate NiCO_{3}•6H_{2}O is claimed to form upon electrolysis of nickel metal under an atmosphere of carbon dioxide. Green and yellow forms of anhydrous NiCO_{3} form when aqueous nickel chloride solutions are heated under high pressures of carbon dioxide.

== Structure and reactions ==
NiCO_{3} adopts a structure like calcite, consisting of nickel in an octahedral coordination geometry. A pentahydrate has also been characterized by X-ray crystallography. Also known as the mineral hellyerite, the solid consists of [Ni_{2}(CO_{3})_{2}(H_{2}O)_{8}] subunits with an extra water of hydration.

Nickel carbonates are hydrolyzed upon contact with aqueous acids to give solutions containing the ion [Ni(H_{2}O)_{6}]^{2+}, liberating water and carbon dioxide in the process. Calcining (heating to drive off CO_{2} and water) of these carbonates gives nickel(II) oxide:

NiCO_{3} → NiO + CO_{2}

The nature of the resulting oxide depends on the nature of the precursor. The oxide obtained from the basic carbonate is often most useful for catalysis.

Basic nickel carbonate can be made by treating solutions of nickel sulfate with sodium carbonate:

4 Ni^{2+} + CO^{2−}_{3} + 6 OH^{−} + 4 H_{2}O → Ni_{4}CO_{3}(OH)_{6}(H_{2}O)_{4}

The hydrated carbonate has been prepared by electrolytic oxidation of nickel in the presence of carbon dioxide:

Ni + O + CO_{2} + 6 H_{2}O → NiCO_{3}(H_{2}O)_{4}

== Uses ==
Nickel carbonates are used in some ceramic applications and as precursors to catalysts.

== Natural occurrence ==
The natural nickel carbonate is hellyerite, mentioned above. Basic Ni carbonates also have some natural representatives.
