= Iron(II) perchlorate =

Names
- IUPAC name Iron(II) diperchlorate
- Other names: Iron diperchlorate; Ferrous perchlorate

Identifiers
CAS Number	hydrate: 335159-18-7
3D model (JSmol)	Interactive image
ChemSpider	146076
ECHA InfoCard	100.034.263
EC Number	237-704-4
PubChem CID	71311361
CompTox Dashboard (EPA)	DTXSID10890732
- InChI: InChI=1S/2ClHO4.Fe.H2O/c2*2-1(3,4)5;;/h2*(H,2,3,4,5);;1H2/q;;+2;/p-2 Key: BJDJGQJHHCBZJZ-UHFFFAOYSA-L
- SMILES: O.[O-]Cl(=O)(=O)=O.[O-]Cl(=O)(=O)=O.[Fe+2]

Properties
Chemical formula	Fe(ClO_{4})_{2}
Molar mass	254.75 g/mol
Appearance	Green crystals
Density	2.15 g/cm^{3}
Melting point	100 °C (212 °F; 373 K)
Solubility in water	98 g/100 mL (25 °C)

Structure
Crystal structure	Orthorhombic
Space group	Pmn2_{1}
Lattice constant	a = 7.79 Å, b = 13.48 Å, c = 5.24 Å

Hazards
- GHS labelling
Pictograms	(GHS03: Oxidizing) (GHS07: Exclamation mark)
Signal word	Danger
Hazard statements	H272, H315, H319, H335
Precautionary statements	P210, P220, P221, P261, P264, P271, P280, P302+P352, P304+P340, P305+P351+P338, P312, P321, P332+P313, P337+P313, P362, P370+P378, P403+P233, P405, P501
NFPA 704 (fire diamond)	2 0 1 OX

Related compounds
Other cations	Manganese(II) perchlorate Cobalt(II) perchlorate Nickel(II) perchlorate
Related compounds	Iron(III) perchlorate
- Except where otherwise noted, data are given for materials in their standard state (at 25 °C [77 °F], 100 kPa). Infobox references

Iron(II) perchlorate is the inorganic compound with the formula Fe(ClO_{4})_{2}·6H_{2}O. It is a green, water-soluble solid.

== Structure ==
The hexahydrate consists of discrete hexa-aquo-iron(II) divalent cations and perchlorate anions. It crystallizes with an orthorhombic structure. It has minor phase transitions at 245 and 336 K.

== Production ==
Iron(II) perchlorate is produced by the reaction of iron metal with dilute perchloric acid followed by evaporation of the solution:

Fe + 2 HClO_{4} + 6 H_{2}O → Fe(ClO_{4})_{2}·6H_{2}O + H_{2}

Although the ferrous cation is a reductant and the perchlorate anion is a strong oxidant, in the absence of atmospheric oxygen, dissolved ferrous perchlorate is stable in aqueous solution because the electron transfer between both species Fe^{2+} and ClO^{−}_{4} is hindered by severe kinetic limitations. Being a weak Lewis base, the perchlorate anion is a poor ligand for the aqueous Fe^{2+} and does not contribute to the electron transfer by favoring the formation of an inner sphere complex giving rise to a possible reorganisation of the activated complex. The resulting high activation energy prohibits a thermodynamically spontaneous redox reaction (∆G_{r} < 0).

However, in aqueous solution, and under air, iron(II) perchlorate slowly oxidizes to iron(III) oxyhydroxide.

== Uses ==
In organic chemistry, iron(II) perchlorate can be used as a source of ferrous ions for the Fenton oxidation.
