= Zirconium(IV) sulfate =

- Zr^{4+} (SO_{4}^{2−})_{2}
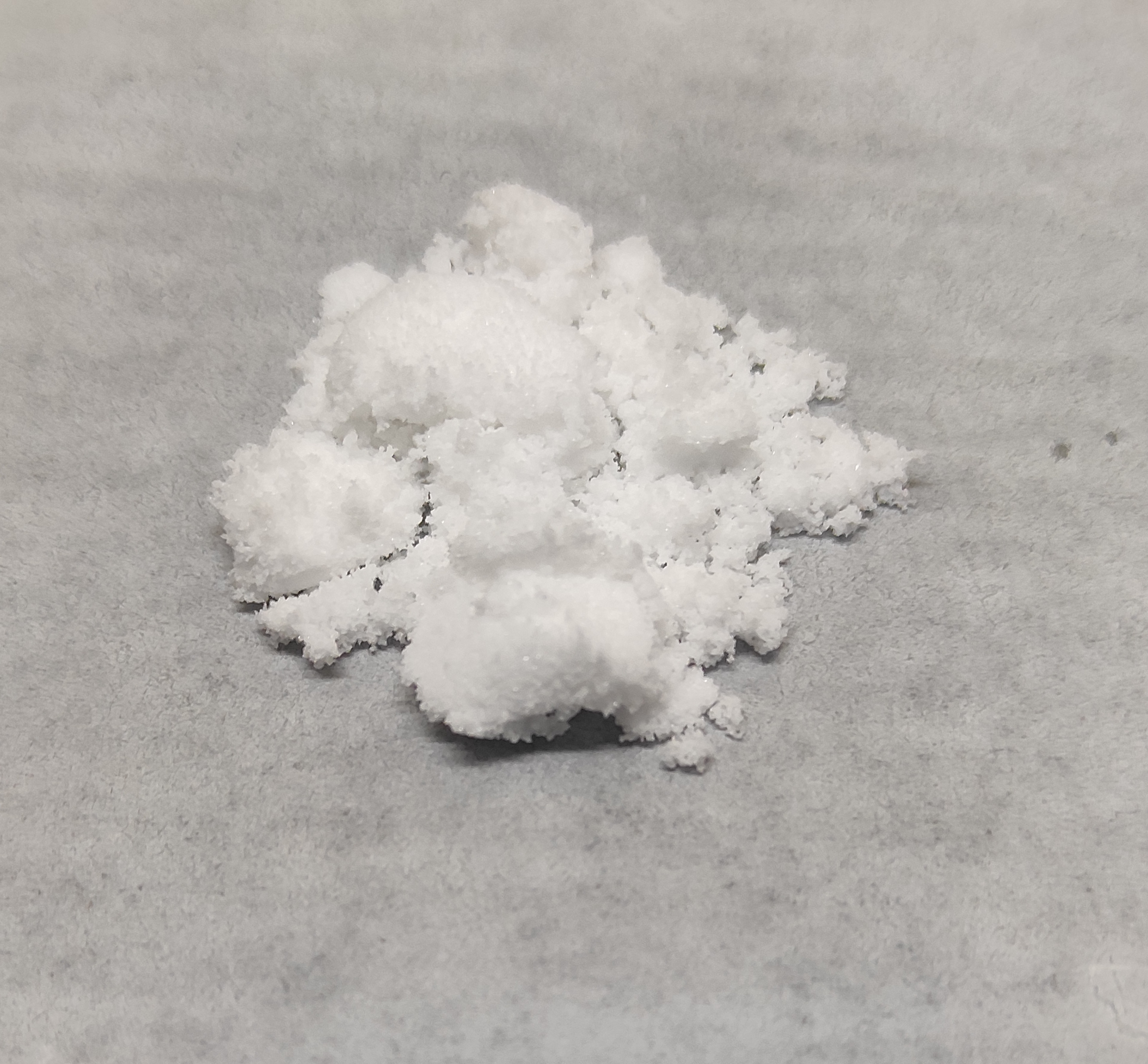

Names
- Other names zirconium disulfate

Identifiers
CAS Number	14644-61-2; 111378-69-9; 7446-31-3 (tetrahydrate)
3D model (JSmol)	Interactive image
ChemSpider	24960
ECHA InfoCard	100.035.162
EC Number	238-694-4
PubChem CID	26793
RTECS number	ZH9100000
UNII	01SJA33642; OS8L03QU95 (tetrahydrate)
CompTox Dashboard (EPA)	DTXSID0021466
- InChI: InChI=1S/2H2O4S.Zr/c2*1-5(2,3)4;/h2*(H2,1,2,3,4);/q;;+4/p-4 Key: ZXAUZSQITFJWPS-UHFFFAOYSA-J
- SMILES: [O-]S(=O)(=O)[O-].[O-]S(=O)(=O)[O-].[Zr+4]

Properties
Chemical formula	Zr(SO_{4})_{2}·xH_{2}O (x = 0, 4, 5, 7)
Molar mass	285.35 g/mol (anhydrous); 355.40 g/mol (tetrahydrate)
Appearance	White solids
Density	3.22 g/cm^{3} (anhydrous); 2.85 g/cm^{3} (tetrahydrate)
Solubility in water	52.5 g/100 mL (tetrahydrate)
Refractive index (n_{D})	1.646

Structure
Crystal structure	orthorhombic

Hazards
- Lethal dose or concentration (LD, LC)
LD_{50} (median dose)	3500 mg/kg (rat, oral)

Related compounds
Other cations	Titanium sulfate; Hafnium sulfate
Related compounds	Zirconyl sulfate
- Except where otherwise noted, data are given for materials in their standard state (at 25 °C [77 °F], 100 kPa). verify (what is ?) Infobox references

Zirconium(IV) sulfate is the name for a family of inorganic compounds with the formula Zr(SO_{4})_{2}·xH_{2}O where x = 0, 4, 5, or 7. These species are related by the degree of hydration. At least some members of the series contain oxo ligands since zirconyl (ZrO^{2+}) is pervasive. These compounds are white or colorless solids that often are soluble in water.

== Preparation and structure ==
Zirconium sulfate is prepared by the action of sulfuric acid on zirconium oxide:

ZrO_{2} + 2 H_{2}SO_{4} + x-2 H_{2}O → Zr(SO_{4})_{2}·xH_{2}O

The anhydrous sulfate is also claimed.

These compounds adopt complex structures featuring 7- and 8-coordinated Zr centres. Both water and sulfate serve as ligands.

== Uses ==
Zirconium sulfate is used in tanning white leather, as a catalyst support, to precipitate proteins and amino acids, and as a pigment stabilizer.
