= Nickel(II) perchlorate =

Compound of nickel

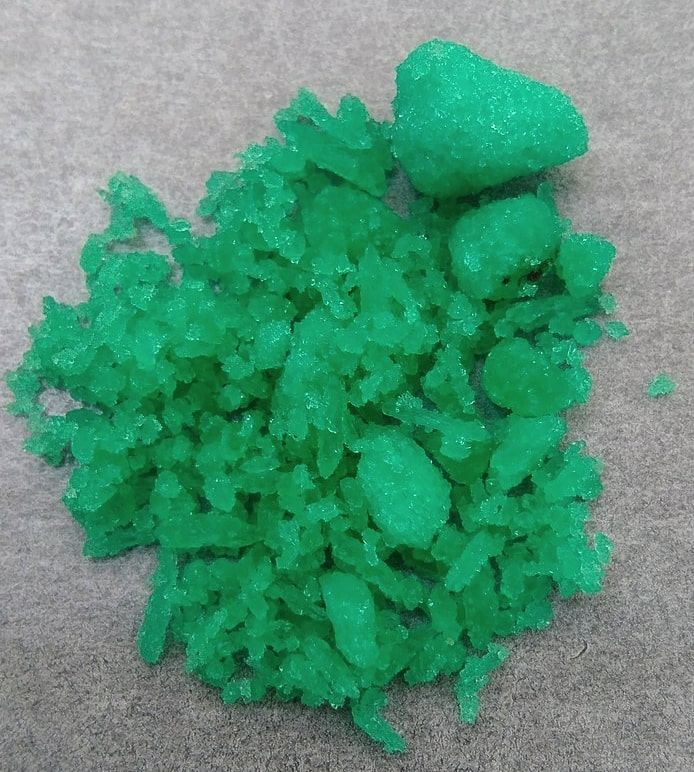
- Nickel perchlorate hexahydrate Some green nickel(II) perchlorate hexahydrate powder.

Names
- IUPAC name Nickel(II) perchlorate
- Other names Nickel diperchlorate Nickel perchlorate Nickel(II) chlorate(VII); Nickel diperchlorate(VII); Nickel perchlorate(VII)

Identifiers
CAS Number	13637-71-3 (hydrate); 13520-61-1 (hexahydrate)
3D model (JSmol)	Interactive image
ChemSpider	24369
ECHA InfoCard	100.033.735
EC Number	237-124-1
PubChem CID	26158
UNII	BQ8A24MEZO
CompTox Dashboard (EPA)	DTXSID5065566
- InChI: InChI=1S/2ClHO4.Ni/c2*2-1(3,4)5;/h2*(H,2,3,4,5);/q;;+2/p-2 Key: ZLQBNKOPBDZKDP-UHFFFAOYSA-L
- SMILES: [O-]Cl(=O)(=O)=O.[O-]Cl(=O)(=O)=O.[Ni+2]

Properties
Chemical formula	Cl_{2}H_{12}NiO_{14}
Molar mass	365.68 g·mol^{−1}
Density	2.98 g/cm³ (hydrate); 1.508 g/cm³ (hexahydrate)
Melting point	140 °C (284 °F; 413 K) (hexahydrate); 149 °C (300 °F; 422 K) (partially decomposed pentahydrate) 103 °C (217 °F; 376 K))
Solubility in water	259 g/100 mL (hexahydrate)
Solubility	soluble in alcohol, acetone

Hazards
- Occupational safety and health (OHS/OSH)
Main hazards	oxidization
- GHS labelling
Pictograms	(GHS03: Oxidizing) (GHS05: Corrosive) (GHS07: Exclamation mark) (GHS09: Environmental hazard)
Signal word	Danger
Hazard statements	H271, H314, H317, H334, H341, H350, H360, H372, H410
Precautionary statements	P201, P260, P273, P280, P303+P361+P353, P304+P340+P310, P305+P351+P338, P308+P313, P391
Flash point	flammable

Related compounds
Other anions	Nickel perrhenate Nickel nitrate
Other cations	Iron(II) perchlorate Copper(II) perchlorate
- Except where otherwise noted, data are given for materials in their standard state (at 25 °C [77 °F], 100 kPa). Infobox references

Nickel(II) perchlorate is a collection of inorganic compounds with the chemical formula of Ni(ClO_{4})_{2}(H_{2}O)_{x}. Its colors of these solids vary with the degree of hydration. For example, the hydrate forms cyan crystals, the pentahydrate forms green crystals, but the hexahydrate (Ni(ClO_{4})_{2}·6H_{2}O) forms blue crystals. Nickel(II) perchlorate hexahydrate is highly soluble in water and soluble in some polar organic solvents.

== Preparation ==
Aqueous solutions of nickel(II) perchlorate can be obtained by treating nickel(II) hydroxide, nickel(II) chloride or nickel(II) carbonate with perchloric acid.

Ni(OH)_{2} + 2 HClO_{4} + 4 H_{2}O → Ni(ClO_{4})_{2}·6H_{2}O

Two hydrates have been characterized by X-ray crystallography: the hexahydrate and the octahydrate. Several other hydrates are mentioned including the pentahydrate, which is claimed to crystallize at room temperature, the nonahydrate, which is claimed to crystallize at −21.3 °C, a tetrahydrate, and a monohydrate.

The yellow anhydrous product is obtained by treating nickel(II) chloride with chlorine trioxide. As deduced by X-ray crystallography, Ni resides in a distorted octahedral environment and the perchlorate ligands bridge between the Ni(II) centers.

== Applications ==
Nickel(II) perchlorates has few practical uses.

== Other compounds ==
- Ni(ClO_{4})_{2} also forms some compounds with NH_{3}, such as Ni(ClO_{4})_{2}·6H_{2}O which is a light purple crystal.
- Ni(ClO_{4})_{2} also forms some compounds with N_{2}H_{4}, including Ni(ClO_{4})_{2}·2N_{2}H_{4} as a light positive solid or Ni(ClO_{4})_{2}·5N_{2}H_{4} which are purple crystals.
- Ni(ClO_{4})_{2} forms compounds with CO(NH_{2})_{2}, like Ni(ClO_{4})_{2}·6CO(NH_{2})_{2} which is a yellow-green solid.
- Ni(ClO_{4})_{2} forms compounds with CON_{3}H_{5}, for example Ni(ClO_{4})_{2}·3CON_{3}H_{5} which is a blue solid.
- Ni(ClO_{4})_{2} forms compounds with CON_{4}H_{6}, such as Ni(ClO_{4})_{2}·3CON_{4}H_{6} which is an explosive blue crystal with a bulk density of 0.95 g/cm^{3}.
- Ni(ClO_{4})_{2} can also form compounds with CS(NH_{2})_{2}, such as Ni(ClO_{4})_{2}·6CS(NH_{2})_{2} which is a pale green solid.
- Ni(ClO_{4})_{2} also forms some compounds with CSN_{3}H_{5}, such as Ni(ClO_{4})_{2}·2CSN_{3}H_{5}·3H_{2}O which is a blue paramagnetic crystal or Ni(ClO_{4})_{2}·3CSN_{3}H_{5}·2H_{2}O which is a dark positive crystal.
- Ni(ClO_{4})_{2} also forms some compounds with pyridine.

== See also ==
- Nickel
- Perchloric acid
