= Nitronium ion =

Polyatomic ion

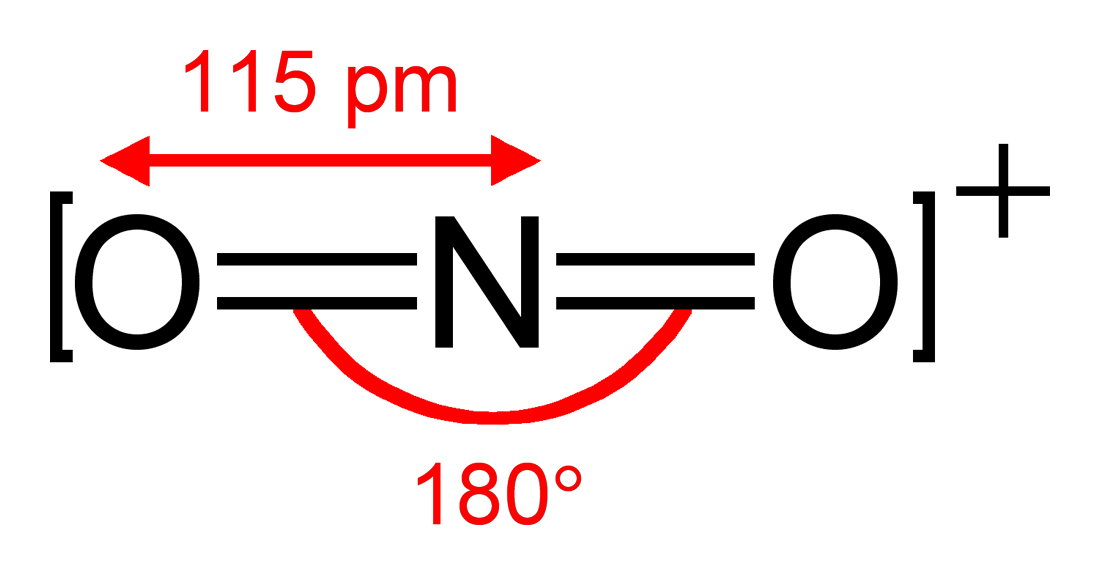
Skeletal formula of nitronium with some dimensions added
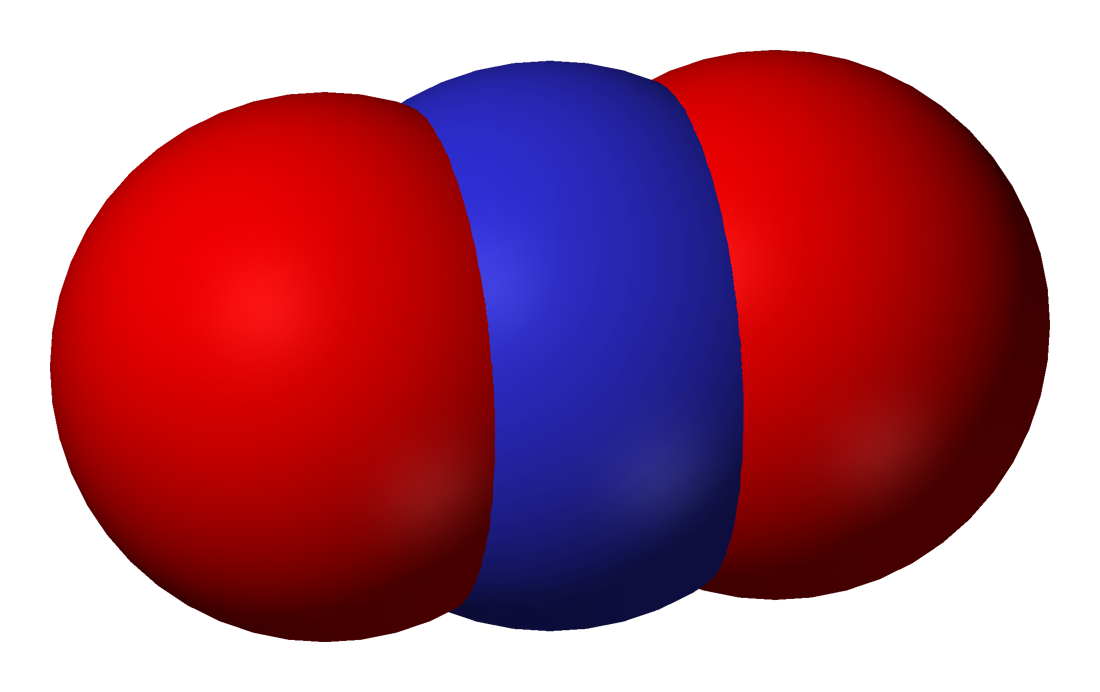
Spacefill model of nitronium
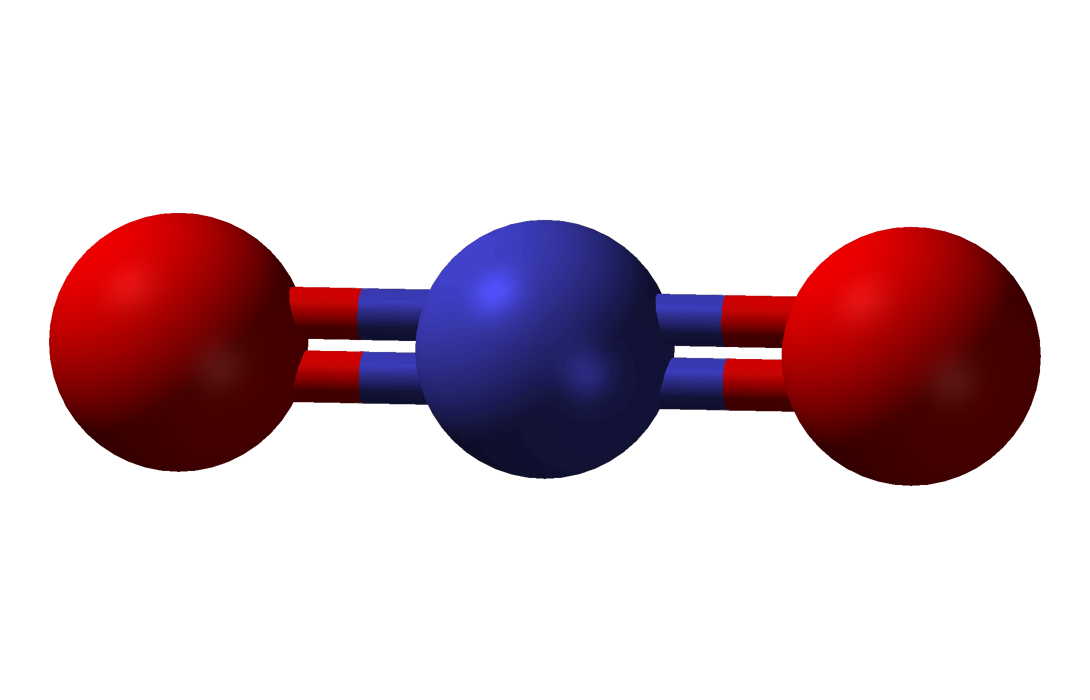
- Ball and stick model of nitronium

Names
- IUPAC name Nitronium ion
- Systematic IUPAC name Dioxidonitrogen(1+)

Identifiers
CAS Number	12269-46-4
3D model (JSmol)	Interactive image
ChEBI	CHEBI:29424
ChemSpider	2844644
PubChem CID	3609161
CompTox Dashboard (EPA)	DTXSID60893596
- InChI: InChI=1S/NO2/c2-1-3/q+1 Key: OMBRFUXPXNIUCZ-UHFFFAOYSA-N
- SMILES: O=[N+]=O

Properties
Chemical formula	[NO_{2}]^{+}
Molar mass	46.005 g·mol^{−1}

Thermochemistry
Std molar entropy (S^{⦵}_{298})	233.86 J K^{−1} mol^{−1}
- Except where otherwise noted, data are given for materials in their standard state (at 25 °C [77 °F], 100 kPa). Infobox references

The nitronium ion, [NO_{2}]^{+}, is a cation. It is an onium ion because its nitrogen atom has +1 charge, similar to ammonium ion [NH_{4}]^{+}. It is created by the removal of an electron from the paramagnetic nitrogen dioxide molecule NO_{2}, or the protonation of nitric acid HNO_{3} (with removal of H_{2}O).

It is stable enough to exist in normal conditions, but it is generally reactive and used extensively as an electrophile in the nitration of other substances. The ion is generated in situ for this purpose by mixing concentrated sulfuric acid and concentrated nitric acid according to the equilibrium:

H_{2}SO_{4} + HNO_{3} ⇌ HSO^{−}_{4} + [NO_{2}]^{+} + H_{2}O

== Structure ==
The nitronium ion is isoelectronic with carbon dioxide and has the same linear structure and bond angle of 180°. For this reason it has a similar vibrational spectrum to carbon dioxide. Historically, the nitronium ion was detected by Raman spectroscopy, because its symmetric stretch is Raman-active but infrared-inactive. The Raman-active symmetrical stretch was first used to identify the ion in nitrating mixtures.

== Salts ==
A few stable nitronium salts with anions of weak nucleophilicity can be isolated. These include nitronium perchlorate [NO_{2}]^{+}[ClO_{4}]^{−}, nitronium tetrafluoroborate [NO_{2}]^{+}[BF_{4}]^{−}, nitronium hexafluorophosphate [NO_{2}]^{+}[PF_{6}]^{−}, nitronium hexafluoroarsenate [NO_{2}]^{+}[AsF_{6}]^{−}, and nitronium hexafluoroantimonate [NO_{2}]^{+}[SbF_{6}]^{−}. These are all very hygroscopic compounds.

The solid form of dinitrogen pentoxide, N_{2}O_{5}, actually consists of nitronium and nitrate ions, so it is an ionic compound, nitronium nitrate [NO_{2}]^{+}[NO_{3}]^{−}, not a molecular solid. However, dinitrogen pentoxide in liquid or gaseous state is molecular and does not contain nitronium ions.

== Related species ==
The compounds nitryl fluoride, NO_{2}F, and nitryl chloride, NO_{2}Cl, are not nitronium salts but molecular compounds, as shown by their low boiling points (−72 °C and −6 °C respectively) and short nitrogen–halogen bond lengths (N–F 135 pm, N–Cl 184 pm).

Addition of one electron forms the neutral nitryl radical, NO_{2}•; in fact, this is fairly stable and known as the compound nitrogen dioxide.

The related negatively charged species is NO^{−}_{2}, the nitrite ion.

== See also ==
- Nitrosonium
