= Nitryl azide =

Names
- IUPAC name N-diazonitramide
- Other names: Nitryl azide; Tetranitrogen dioxide

Identifiers
CAS Number	40006-84-6
3D model (JSmol)	Interactive image
PubChem CID	22902439
- InChI: InChI=1S/N4O2/c1-2-3-4(5)6 Key: DYMRYCZRMAHYKE-UHFFFAOYSA-N
- SMILES: [N-]=[N+]=N[N+](=O)[O-]

Properties
Chemical formula	N_{3}−NO_{2}
Molar mass	88.026 g·mol^{−1}

Related compounds
Related compounds	Nitrosyl azide
- Except where otherwise noted, data are given for materials in their standard state (at 25 °C [77 °F], 100 kPa). Infobox references

Nitryl azide (tetranitrogen dioxide) is an inorganic compound with the chemical formula N_{3}−NO_{2}. It is an unstable nitrogen oxide consisting of a covalent nitrogen–nitrogen bond between a nitro group and an azide group. It has been detected by infrared spectroscopy as a short-lived product of the reaction between sodium azide and nitronium hexafluoroantimonate:

It is also the product of nitryl chloride and silver azide.

The compound quickly decomposes to form two nitrous oxide molecules. Calculations suggest that this process occurs via an oxatetrazole oxide intermediate:
