= Nitronium hexafluorouranate =

Identifiers
| 3D model (JSmol) | Interactive image |
- InChI: InChI=1S/6FH.NO2.U/c;;;;;;2-1-3;/h6*1H;;/q;;;;;;+1;+5/p-6 Key: TYACERPYYPUMFO-UHFFFAOYSA-H
- SMILES: O=[N+]=O.F[U-](F)(F)(F)(F)F

Properties
| Chemical formula | F_{6}NO_{2}U |
| Molar mass | 398.024 g·mol^{−1} |

Related compounds
| Other anions | Nitronium hexafluoroantimonate |
- Except where otherwise noted, data are given for materials in their standard state (at 25 °C [77 °F], 100 kPa). Infobox references

Nitronium hexafluorouranate is an inorganic compound with the chemical formula NO_{2}UF_{6}, composed of the nitronium cation [NO_{2}]^{+} and hexafluorouranate anion [UF_{6}]^{-}.

== Preparation ==
It can be formed by mixing nitryl fluoride (FNO_{2}) and UF_{6}.
