= Nitronium hexafluoroantimonate =

Names
- IUPAC name nitronium hexafluoroantimony(1-)
- Systematic IUPAC name nitronium hexafluoroantimonate

Identifiers
CAS Number	17856-92-7
3D model (JSmol)	Interactive image
ChemSpider	21242074
ECHA InfoCard	100.152.871
EC Number	624-265-2
PubChem CID	45933659
CompTox Dashboard (EPA)	DTXSID10672878
- InChI: InChI=1S/6FH.NO2.Sb/c;2-1-3;/h6*1H;/q;+1;+5/p-6 Key: OFNJLTRMKNMFSW-UHFFFAOYSA-H
- SMILES: [N+](=O)=O.F[Sb-](F)(F)(F)(F)F

Properties
Chemical formula	F_{6}NO_{2}Sb
Molar mass	281.755 g·mol^{−1}
Appearance	white solid

Hazards
- GHS labelling
Pictograms	(GHS07: Exclamation mark) (GHS09: Environmental hazard)
Signal word	Warning
Hazard statements	H302, H332, H411
Precautionary statements	P261, P264, P270, P271, P273, P301+P317, P304+P340, P317, P330, P391, P501

Related compounds
Other anions	Nitronium hexafluorouranate
- Except where otherwise noted, data are given for materials in their standard state (at 25 °C [77 °F], 100 kPa). Infobox references

Nitronium hexafluoroantimonate is an inorganic compound with the chemical formula NO_{2}F_{6}Sb, composed of the nitronium cation [NO_{2}]^{+} and hexafluoroantimonate anion [SbF_{6}]^{-}. It is stable at room temperature under anhydrous conditions. The decomposition of this substance releases hydrogen fluoride, nitrogen oxides, and antimony oxides.

== Preparation ==
Nitronium hexafluoroantimonate can be prepared by reacting dinitrogen tetroxide with antimony trioxide in the presence of bromine trifluoride.

N_{2}O_{4} + Sb_{2}O_{3} + 4BrF_{3} → NO_{2}SbF_{6} + Br_{2} + Br_{2}O_{3}

It is also formed by reacting antimony pentafluoride with nitryl fluoride.

SbF_{5} + NO_{2}F → NO_{2}F_{6}Sb

== Uses ==
Nitronium hexafluoroantimonate can be used in aromatic nitration reactions.

It can also be used as a P-type dopant on single-walled carbon nanotubes.
