= Nitrogen oxide =

Nitrogen oxide may refer to a binary compound of oxygen and nitrogen, or a mixture of such compounds:

== Charge-neutral ==
- Nitric oxide (NO), nitrogen(II) oxide, or nitrogen monoxide
- Nitrogen dioxide (NO_{2}), nitrogen(IV) oxide
- Nitrogen trioxide (NO_{3}), or nitrate radical
- Nitrous oxide (N_{2}O), nitrogen(0,II) oxide
- Dinitrogen dioxide (N_{2}O_{2}), nitrogen(II) oxide dimer
- Dinitrogen trioxide (N_{2}O_{3}), nitrogen(II,IV) oxide
- Dinitrogen tetroxide (N_{2}O_{4}), nitrogen(IV) oxide dimer
- Dinitrogen pentoxide (N_{2}O_{5}), nitrogen(V) oxide, or nitronium nitrate [NO_{2}]^{+}[NO_{3}]^{−}
- Nitrosyl azide (N_{4}O), nitrogen(−I,0,I,II) oxide
- Nitryl azide (N_{4}O_{2})
- Oxatetrazole (N_{4}O)
- Trinitramide (N(NO_{2})_{3} or N_{4}O_{6}), nitrogen(0,IV) oxide

== Anions ==
Name	Formula
Nitroxide	O=N^{−} or NO^{−}
Nitrite	O=N−O^{−} or NO^{−}_{2}
Nitrate	O_{2}N−O^{−} or NO^{−}_{3}
Peroxynitrite	O=N−O−O^{−} or NO^{−}_{3}
Peroxynitrate	O_{2}N−O−O^{−} or NO^{−}_{4}
Orthonitrate	^{+}N(−O^{−})_{4} or NO^{3−}_{4}
Hyponitrite	^{−}O−N=N−O^{−} or N_{2}O^{2−}_{2}
Trioxodinitrate or hyponitrate	O=N−N(−O^{−})_{2} or N_{2}O^{2−}_{3}
Nitroxylate	(^{−}O−)_{2}N−N(−O^{−})_{2} or N_{2}O^{4−}_{4}
Dinitramide	O_{2}N−N^{−}−NO_{2} or N_{3}O^{−}_{4}

== Cations ==
- Nitrosonium (N≡O^{+} or [NO]^{+})
- Nitronium (O=N^{+}=O or [NO_{2}]^{+})

== Atmospheric sciences ==
In atmospheric chemistry:

- NO_{x} (or NOx) refers to the sum of NO and NO_{2}.
- NO_{y} (or NOy) refers to the sum of NO_{x} and all oxidized atmospheric odd-nitrogen species (e.g. the sum of NO_{x}, HNO_{3}, HNO_{2}, etc.)
- NO_{z} (or NOz) = NO_{y} − NO_{x}
- Mixed Oxides of Nitrogen ("MON"): solutions of nitric oxide in dinitrogen tetroxide/nitrogen dioxide.
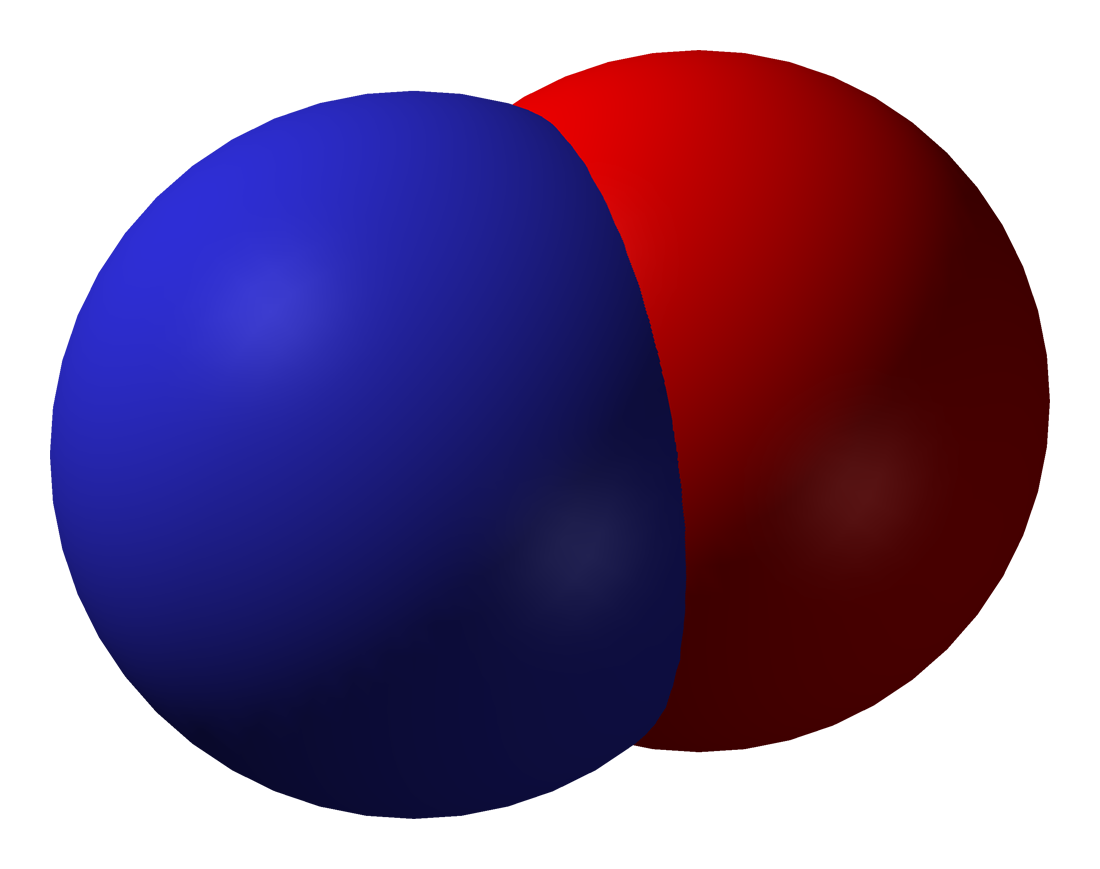
Nitric oxide, NO

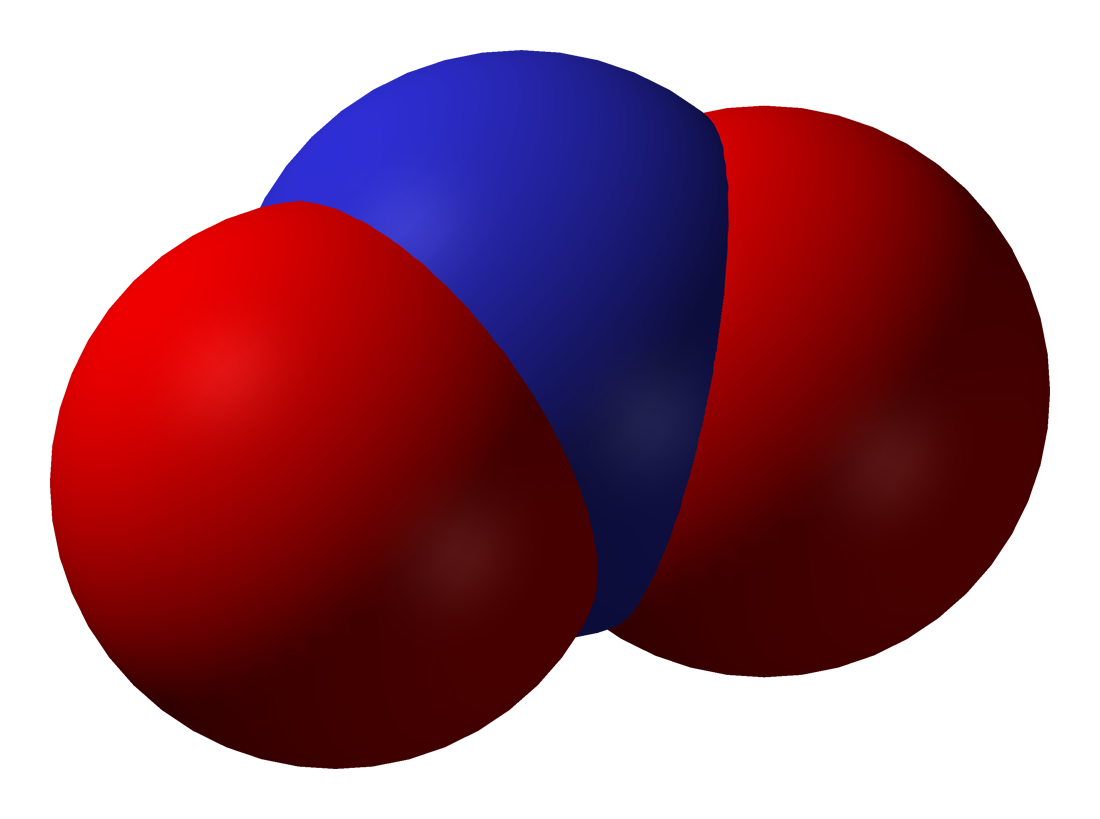
Nitrogen dioxide, NO_{2}

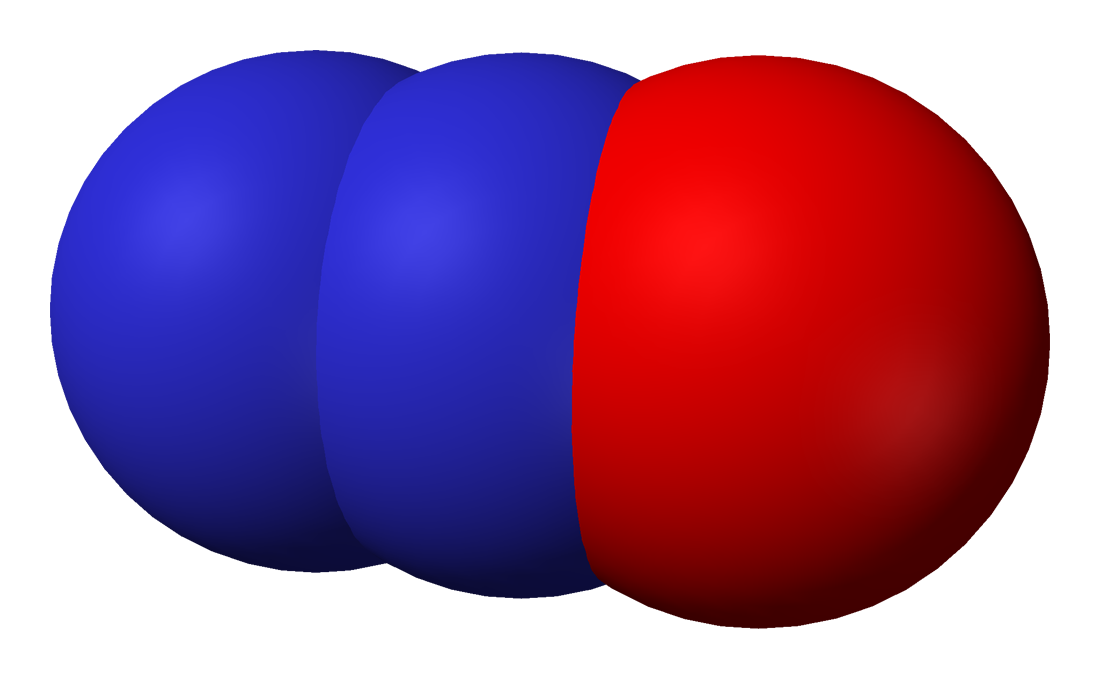
Nitrous oxide, N_{2}O

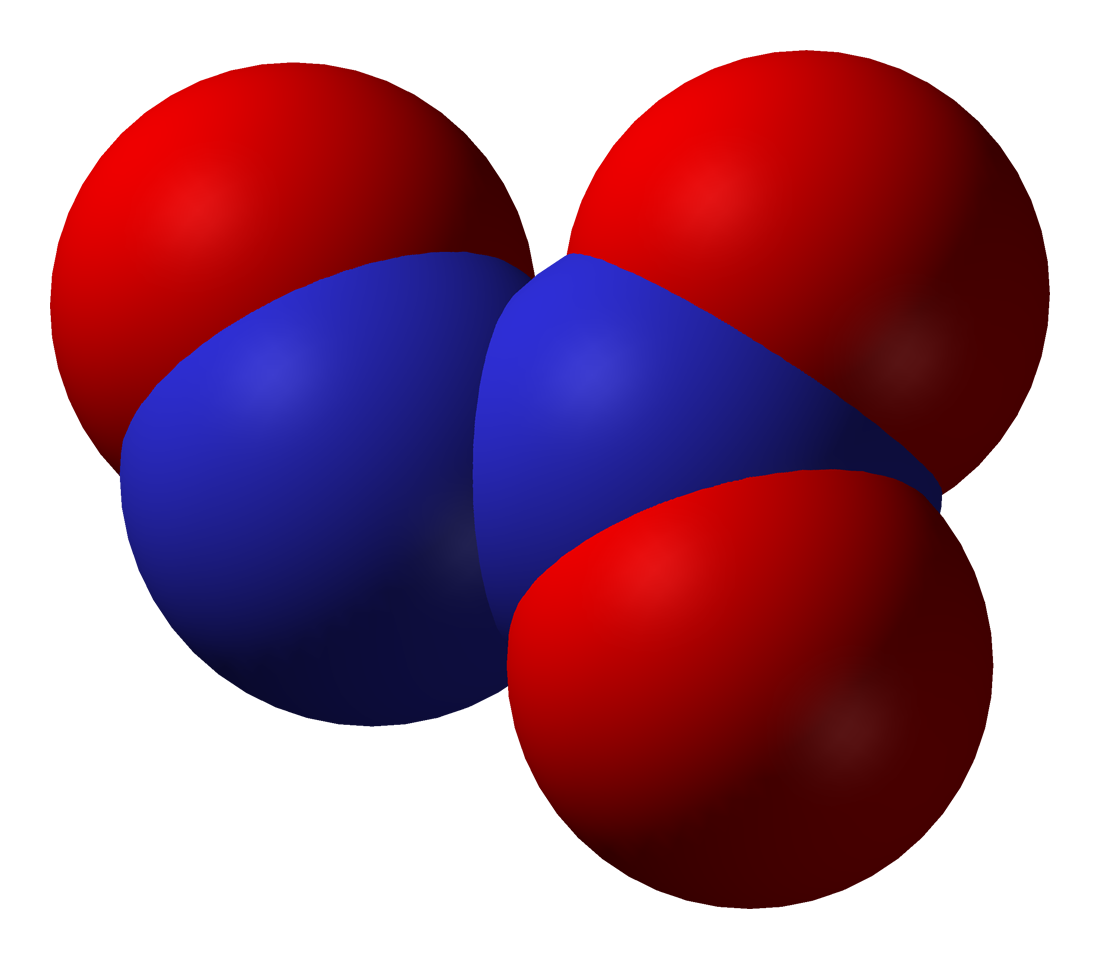
Dinitrogen trioxide, N_{2}O_{3}

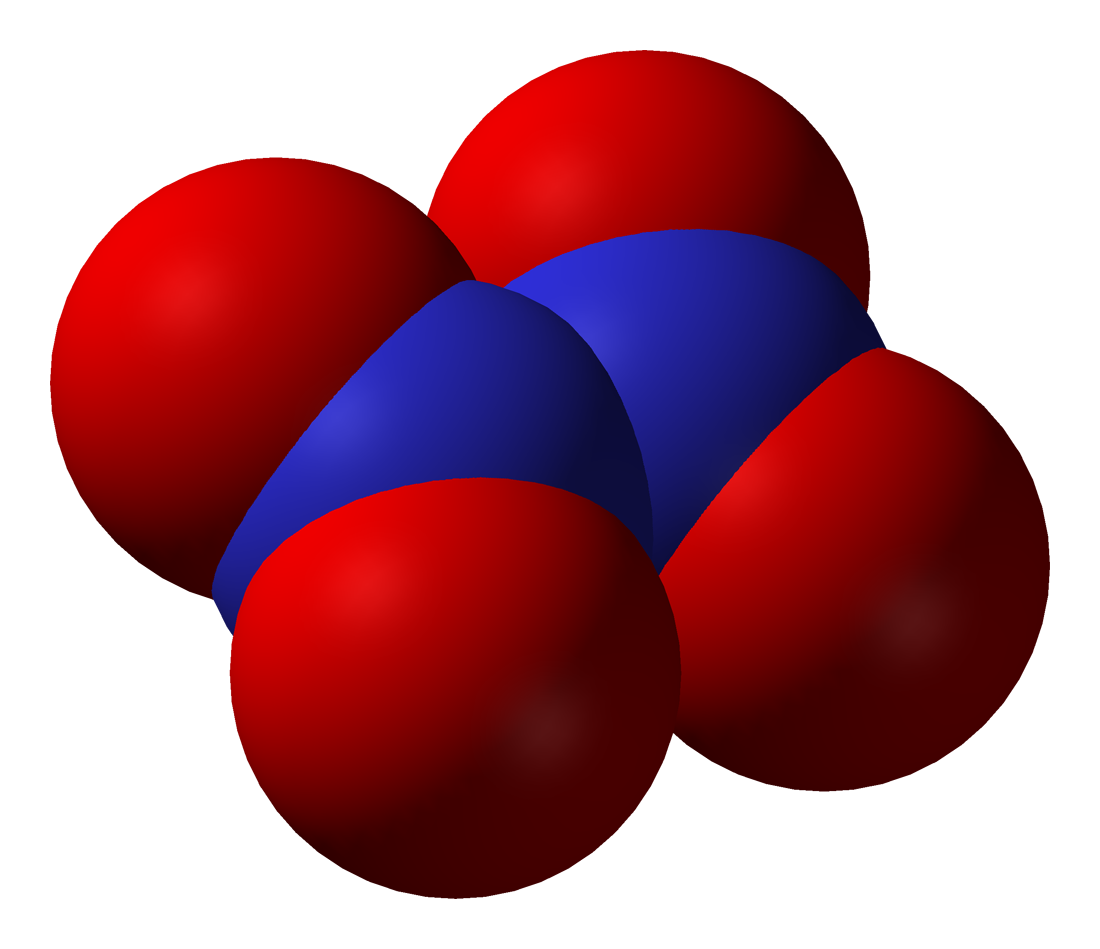
Dinitrogen tetroxide, N_{2}O_{4}

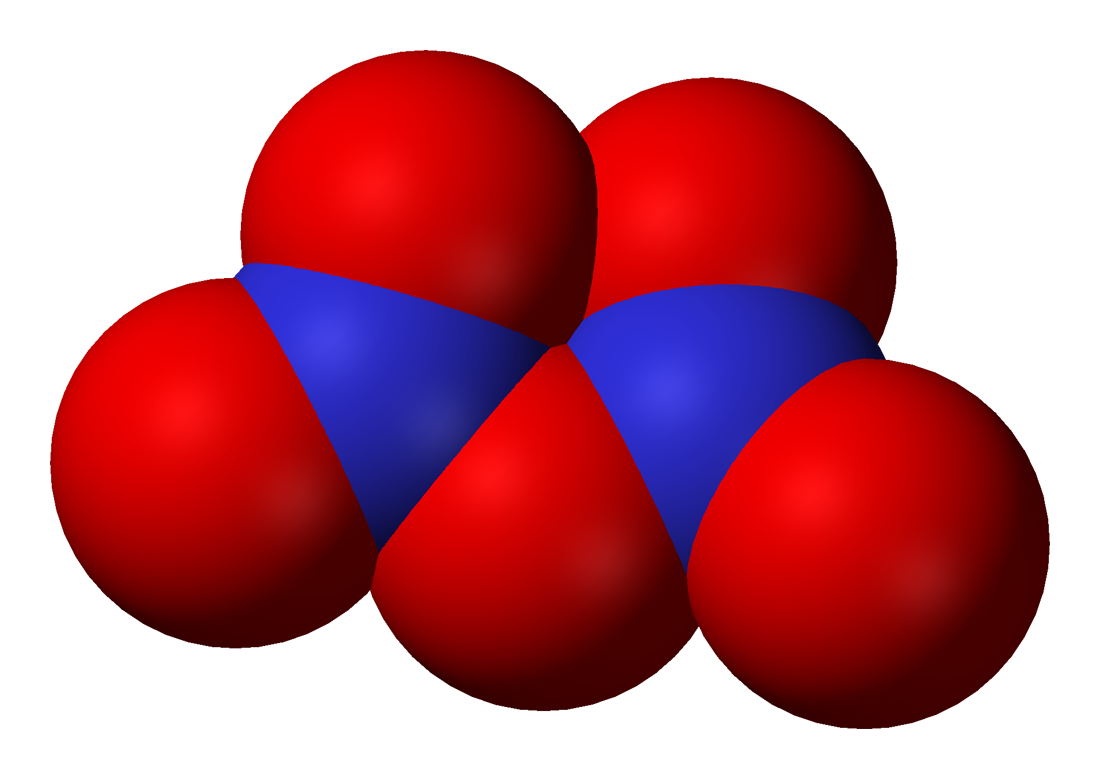
Dinitrogen pentoxide, N_{2}O_{5}

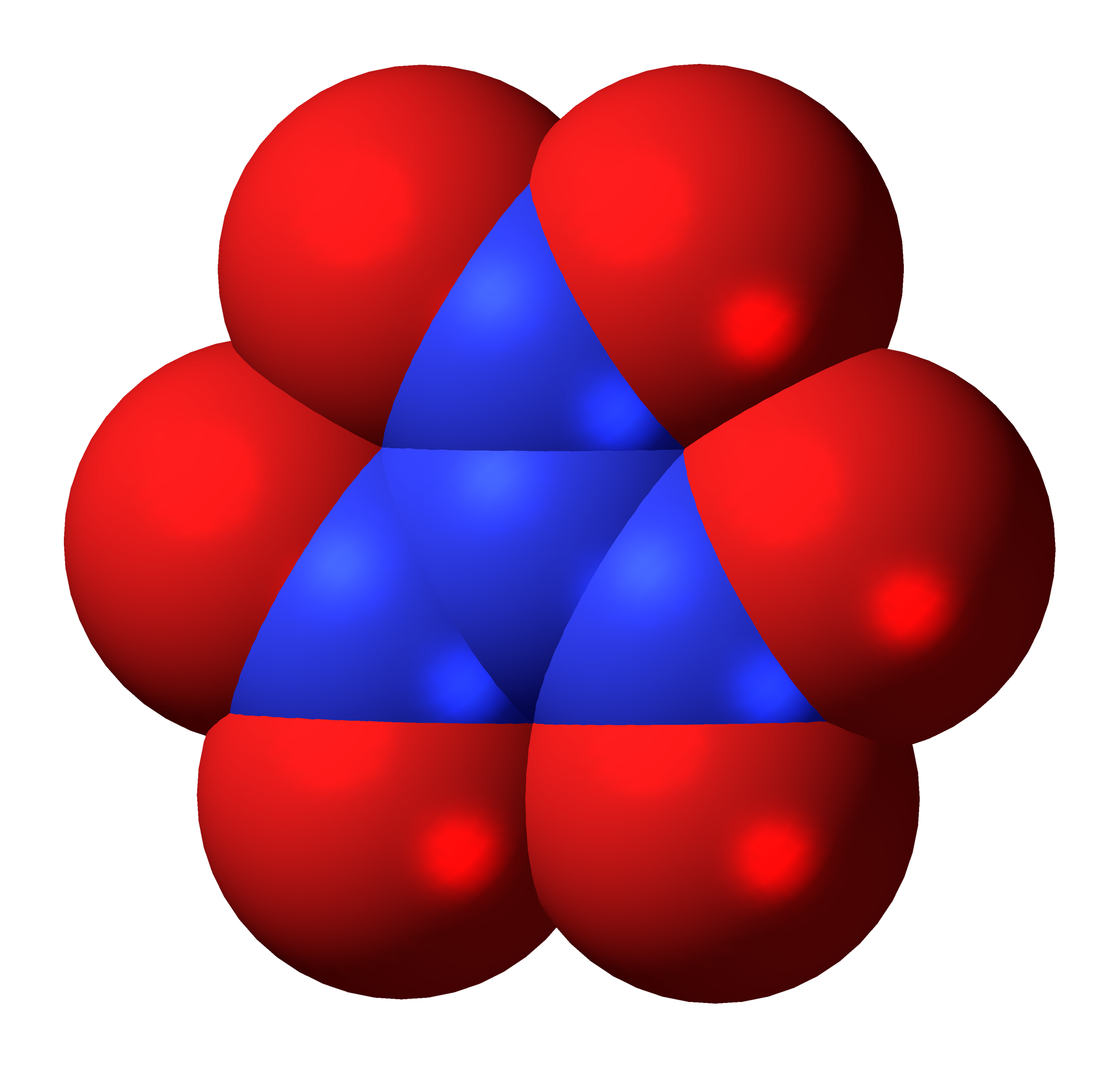
Trinitramide, N_{4}O_{6}

== Stability ==
Due to relatively weak N–O bonding, all nitrogen oxides are unstable with respect to N_{2} and O_{2}, which is the principle behind the catalytic converter, and prevents the oxygen and nitrogen in the atmosphere from combusting.

== See also ==
- Nitrate
- Nitrogen oxide sensor
- Sulfur nitrides, which are valence isoelectronic with nitrogen oxides
