= N4O =

The molecular formula N_{4}O (molar mass: 72.03 g/mol, exact mass: 72.0072 u) may refer to:

- Nitrosylazide
- Oxatetrazole

== See also ==
- Dinitrogen tetroxide
