= Dinitrogen pentoxide =

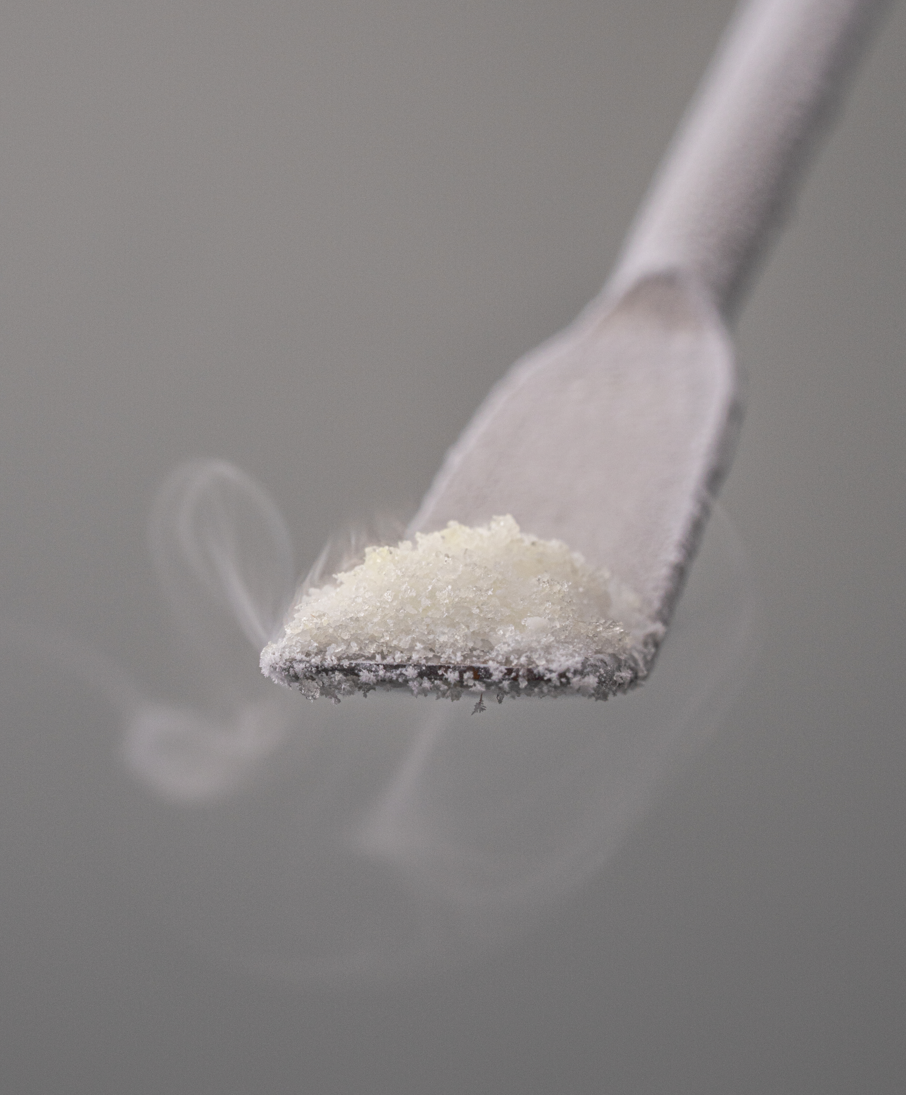

Names
- IUPAC name Dinitrogen pentoxide
- Other names Nitric anhydride Nitronium nitrate Nitryl nitrate DNPO; Anhydrous nitric acid

Identifiers
CAS Number	10102-03-1
3D model (JSmol)	gas phase: Interactive image; solid phase: Interactive image
ChEBI	CHEBI:29802
ChemSpider	59627
ECHA InfoCard	100.030.227
EC Number	233-264-2
PubChem CID	66242
UNII	6XB659ZX2W
CompTox Dashboard (EPA)	DTXSID90143672
- InChI: InChI=1S/N2O5/c3-1(4)7-2(5)6 Key: ZWWCURLKEXEFQT-UHFFFAOYSA-N; InChI=1/N2O5/c3-1(4)7-2(5)6 Key: ZWWCURLKEXEFQT-UHFFFAOYAN
- SMILES: gas phase: [O-][N+](=O)O[N+]([O-])=O; solid phase: [O]=[N+]=[O].[N+](=O)([O-])[O-]

Properties
Chemical formula	N_{2}O_{5}
Molar mass	108.009 g·mol^{−1}
Appearance	white solid
Density	2.0 g/cm^{3}
Boiling point	33 °C (91 °F; 306 K) sublimes
Solubility in water	Reacts to form nitric acid (HNO_{3}).
Solubility in chloroform	soluble
Solubility in carbon tetrachloride	slightly soluble
Vapor pressure	100 kPa (15 psi) (33.2 °C (91.8 °F))
Band gap	0.68 eV
Magnetic susceptibility (χ)	−35.6×10^{−6} cm^{3}/mol (aq)
Dipole moment	1.39 D

Structure
Crystal structure	Hexagonal, hP14
Space group	P6_{3}/mmc (No. 194)
Point group	6/mmm
Lattice constant	a = 5.37 Å, b = 5.37 Å, c = 6.52 Å α = 90°, β = 90°, γ = 120°
Lattice volume (V)	162.90 Å^{3}
Formula units (Z)	2
Coordination geometry	Linear at N^{5+} to 2·O^{2−}; Trigonal planar at N^{5+} to 3·O^{2−}; Single-bond at O^{2−} to N^{5+}.

Thermochemistry (solid)
Heat capacity (C)	143.1 J⋅mol^{−1}⋅K^{−1}
Std molar entropy (S^{⦵}_{298})	178.2 J⋅mol^{−1}⋅K^{−1}
Std enthalpy of formation (Δ_{f}H^{⦵}_{298})	−43.1 kJ⋅mol^{−1}
Gibbs free energy (Δ_{f}G^{⦵})	113.9 kJ⋅mol^{−1}

Thermochemistry (gas)
Heat capacity (C)	143.1 J⋅mol^{−1}⋅K^{−1}
Std molar entropy (S^{⦵}_{298})	355.7 J⋅mol^{−1}⋅K^{−1}
Std enthalpy of formation (Δ_{f}H^{⦵}_{298})	13.3 kJ⋅mol^{−1}
Gibbs free energy (Δ_{f}G^{⦵})	117.1 kJ⋅mol^{−1}

Hazards
- Occupational safety and health (OHS/OSH)
Main hazards	strong oxidizer, forms strong acid in contact with water
NFPA 704 (fire diamond)	4 0 2 W; OX

Related compounds
Related nitrogen oxides	Nitrous oxide; Nitric oxide; Dinitrogen trioxide; Nitrogen dioxide; Dinitrogen tetroxide
Related compounds	Nitric acid
- Except where otherwise noted, data are given for materials in their standard state (at 25 °C [77 °F], 100 kPa). verify (what is ?) Infobox references

Dinitrogen pentoxide (also known as nitrogen pentoxide or nitric anhydride) is the chemical compound with the formula N_{2}O_{5}. It is one of the binary nitrogen oxides, a family of compounds that contain only nitrogen and oxygen. It exists as colourless crystals that sublime slightly above room temperature, yielding a colorless gas.

Dinitrogen pentoxide has been used for nitrations but has largely been superseded by nitronium tetrafluoroborate (NO_{2}BF_{4}).

== Structure ==
structure of gaseous N_{2}O_{5}

Solid N_{2}O_{5} is a salt, nitronium nitrate, consisting of linear nitronium cations ([NO_{2}]^{+}) and planar trigonal nitrate anions ([NO_{3}]^{−}). The N-O distances in the cation are 115 pm (1.15 Å) and 124 pm (1.24 Å) for the anion. Gaseous N_{2}O_{5} is a covalently-bound molecule. It crystallizes in the space group D^{4}_{6h} (C6/mmc) with Z = 2.

In the gas phase or when dissolved in nonpolar solvents such as carbon tetrachloride, the compound exists as covalently-bonded molecules O_{2}N−O−NO_{2}. In the gas phase, theoretical calculations for the minimum-energy configuration indicate that the O−N−O angle in each −NO_{2} wing is about 134° and the N−O−N angle is about 112°. In that configuration, the two −NO_{2} groups are rotated about 35° around the bonds to the central oxygen, away from the N−O−N plane. The molecule thus has a propeller shape, with one axis of 180° rotational symmetry (C_{2}).

== Physical properties ==
The vapor pressure P (in atm) as a function of temperature T (in kelvin), in the range 211 to 305 K (−62 to 32 °C; −80 to 89 °F), is well approximated by the formula

ln P = 23.2348 - 7098.2/T

being about 48 Torr (6.4 kPa) at 0 °C (32 °F), 424 Torr (56.5 kPa) at 25 °C (77 °F), and 760 Torr (101 kPa) at 32 °C (90 °F), (9 °C (48 °F) below the melting point).

When gaseous N_{2}O_{5} is cooled rapidly ("quenched"), one can obtain the metastable molecular form, which exothermically converts to the ionic form above −70 °C (−94 °F).

Gaseous N_{2}O_{5} absorbs ultraviolet light with dissociation into the free radicals nitrogen dioxide NO^{•}_{2} and nitrogen trioxide NO^{•}_{3} (uncharged nitrate). The absorption spectrum has a broad band with maximum at wavelength 160 nm.

== Preparation ==
N_{2}O_{5} was first reported by the French chemist Henri Deville in 1840, who prepared it by treating silver nitrate (AgNO_{3}) with chlorine.

A recommended laboratory synthesis entails dehydrating nitric acid (HNO_{3}) with phosphorus(V) oxide (P_{4}O_{10}):

P_{4}O_{10} + 12 HNO_{3} → 4 H_{3}PO_{4} + 6 N_{2}O_{5}

Another laboratory process is the reaction of lithium nitrate (LiNO_{3}) and bromine pentafluoride (BrF_{5}), in the ratio exceeding 3:1. The reaction first forms nitryl fluoride (FNO_{2}) that reacts further with the lithium nitrate:

BrF_{5} + 3 LiNO_{3} → 3 LiF + BrONO_{2} + O_{2} + 2 FNO_{2}
FNO_{2} + LiNO_{3} → LiF + N_{2}O_{5}

The compound can also be created in the gas phase by reacting nitrogen dioxide (NO_{2}) or N_{2}O_{4} with ozone:

2 NO_{2} + O_{3} → N_{2}O_{5} + O_{2}

However, the product catalyzes the rapid decomposition of ozone:

2 O_{3} + N_{2}O_{5} → 3 O_{2} + N_{2}O_{5}

Dinitrogen pentoxide is also formed when a mixture of oxygen and nitrogen is passed through an electric discharge. Another route is the reactions of phosphoryl chloride (POCl_{3}) or nitryl chloride (NO_{2}Cl) with silver nitrate (AgNO_{3}).

== Reactions ==
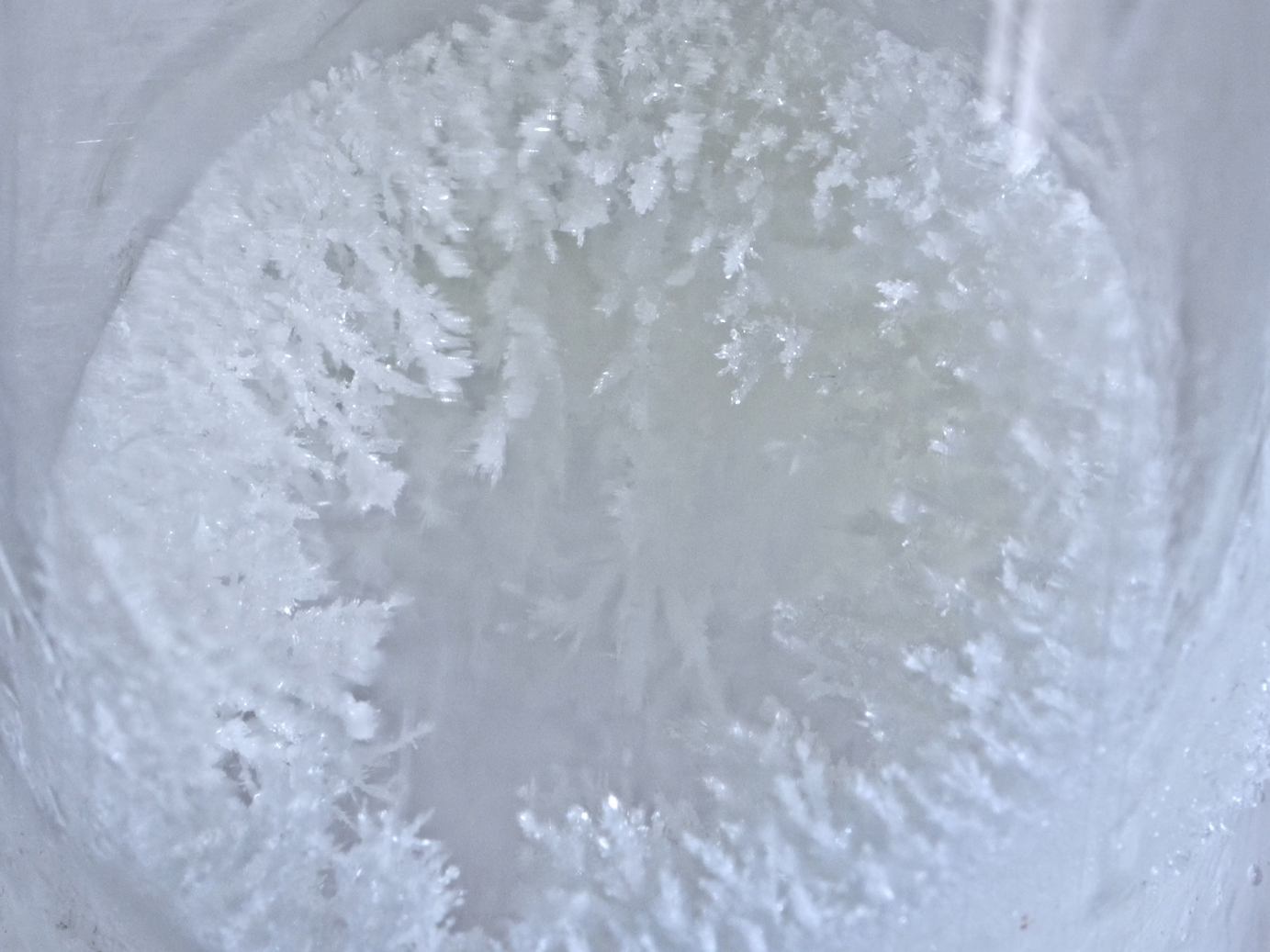
Sublimed dinitrogen pentoxide crystals

Dinitrogen pentoxide reacts with water (hydrolyses) to produce nitric acid (HNO_{3}). Thus, dinitrogen pentoxide is an acidic oxide, the anhydride of nitric acid:

N_{2}O_{5} + H_{2}O → 2 HNO_{3}

Solutions of dinitrogen pentoxide in nitric acid can be seen as nitric acid with more than 100% concentration. The phase diagram of the system H_{2}O−N_{2}O_{5} shows the well-known negative azeotrope at 60% N_{2}O_{5} (that is, 70% HNO_{3}), a positive azeotrope at 85.7% N_{2}O_{5} (100% HNO_{3}), and another negative one at 87.5% N_{2}O_{5} ("102% HNO_{3}").

The reaction with hydrogen chloride (HCl) also gives nitric acid and nitryl chloride (NO_{2}Cl):

N_{2}O_{5} + HCl → HNO_{3} + NO_{2}Cl

Dinitrogen pentoxide reacts with ammonia (NH_{3}) to give several products, including nitrous oxide (N_{2}O), ammonium nitrate (NH_{4}NO_{3}), nitramide (NH_{2}NO_{2}), and ammonium dinitramide (NH_{4}N(NO_{2})_{2}), depending on reaction conditions.

=== Thermal decomposition ===
Decomposition is negligible if the solid is kept at 0 °C (32 °F). It decomposes at room temperature into nitrogen dioxide (NO_{2}) and O_{2}:

N_{2}O_{5} → 2 NO_{2} + 0.5 O_{2}

Its solutions in carbon tetrachloride (CCl_{4}) decompose at 30 °C (86 °F). Both N_{2}O_{5} and NO_{2} are soluble in CCl_{4} and remain in solution while oxygen is insoluble and escapes. The volume of the oxygen allows determination of the reaction kinetics:

2 N_{2}O_{5} → 4 NO_{2} + O_{2}(g)

In the presence of nitric oxide (NO), the decomposition proceeds as follows:

N_{2}O_{5} + NO → 3 NO_{2}

== Applications ==
=== Nitration of organic compounds ===
Dinitrogen pentoxide, for example as a solution in chloroform (CHCl_{3}), has been used as a reagent to introduce the −NO_{2} functionality in organic compounds. This nitration reaction is represented as follows:

N_{2}O_{5} + Ar−H → HNO_{3} + Ar−NO_{2}

Where Ar represents an arene moiety. The reactivity of the NO^{+}_{2} can be further enhanced with strong acids that generate the superelectrophile HNO^{2+}_{2}.

In this use, N_{2}O_{5} has been largely replaced by nitronium tetrafluoroborate ([NO_{2}]^{+}[BF_{4}]^{−}). This salt retains the high reactivity of NO^{+}_{2}, but it is thermally stable, decomposing at about 180 °C (356 °F) (into nitryl fluoride (NO_{2}F) and boron trifluoride (BF_{3})).

Dinitrogen pentoxide is relevant to the preparation of explosives.

== Atmospheric occurrence ==
In Earth's atmosphere, dinitrogen pentoxide is an important reservoir of the NO_{x} species that are responsible for ozone depletion: its formation provides a null cycle with which NO and NO_{2} are temporarily held in an unreactive state. Mixing ratios of several parts per billion by volume have been observed in polluted regions of the nighttime troposphere. Dinitrogen pentoxide has also been observed in the stratosphere at similar levels, the reservoir formation having been postulated in considering the puzzling observations of a sudden drop in stratospheric NO_{2} levels above 50° N, the so-called 'Noxon cliff'.

Variations in N_{2}O_{5} reactivity in aerosols can result in significant losses in tropospheric ozone, hydroxyl radicals, and NO_{x} concentrations. Two important reactions of N_{2}O_{5} in atmospheric aerosols are hydrolysis to form nitric acid and reaction with halide ions, particularly Cl^{−}, to form nitryl chloride (ClNO_{2}) molecules which may serve as precursors to reactive chlorine atoms in the atmosphere.

== Hazards ==
N_{2}O_{5} is a strong oxidizer that forms explosive mixtures with organic compounds and ammonium salts. Dinitrogen pentoxide can degrade to the highly toxic nitrogen dioxide gas.
