= Dinitrogen trioxide =

- Dinitrogen trioxide resonance hybrid

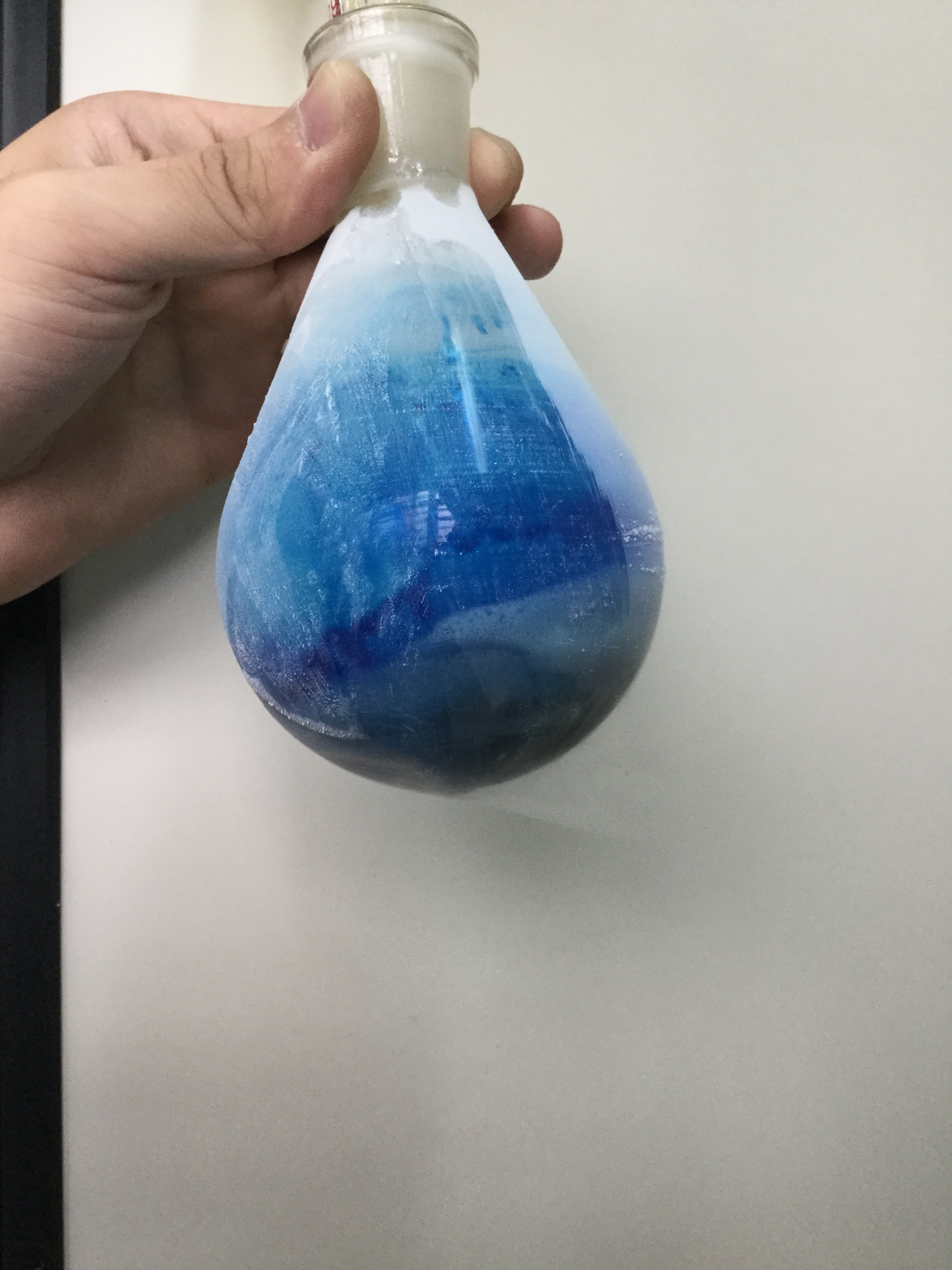
- Dinitrogen trioxide is blue

Names
- IUPAC name N-Oxonitramide
- Other names: Nitrous anhydride; Nitrogen sesquioxide

Identifiers
CAS Number	10544-73-7
3D model (JSmol)	Interactive image
ChEBI	CHEBI:29799
ChemSpider	55446
ECHA InfoCard	100.031.013
EC Number	234-128-5
PubChem CID	61526
UNII	16E0524PXI
UN number	2421
CompTox Dashboard (EPA)	DTXSID7065120
- InChI: InChI=1S/N2O3/c3-1-2(4)5 Key: LZDSILRDTDCIQT-UHFFFAOYSA-N; InChI=1/N2O3/c3-1-2(4)5 Key: LZDSILRDTDCIQT-UHFFFAOYAC
- SMILES: [O-][N+](=O)N=O

Properties
Chemical formula	N_{2}O_{3}
Molar mass	76.011 g·mol^{−1}
Appearance	Deep blue liquid
Density	1.447 g/cm^{3}, liquid; 1.783 g/m^{3}, gas
Melting point	−100.7 °C (−149.3 °F; 172.5 K)
Boiling point	3.5 °C (38.3 °F; 276.6 K) (dissociates)
Solubility in water	reacts to form nitrous acid
Solubility	soluble in ether
Magnetic susceptibility (χ)	−16.0·10^{−6} cm^{3}/mol

Structure
Molecular shape	planar, C_{s}
Dipole moment	2.122 D

Thermochemistry
Heat capacity (C)	65.3 J/(mol·K)
Std molar entropy (S^{⦵}_{298})	314.63 J/(mol·K)
Std enthalpy of formation (Δ_{f}H^{⦵}_{298})	91.20 kJ/mol

Hazards
- GHS labelling
Pictograms	(GHS03: Oxidizing) (GHS05: Corrosive) (GHS06: Toxic)
Signal word	Danger
Hazard statements	H270, H310+H330, H314
Precautionary statements	P220, P244, P260, P262, P264, P270, P271, P280, P284, P301+P330+P331, P302+P350, P303+P361+P353, P304+P340, P305+P351+P338, P310, P320, P321, P361, P363, P370+P376, P403, P403+P233, P405, P410+P403, P501
NFPA 704 (fire diamond)	4 0 2 OX
Flash point	Non-flammable

Related compounds
Related compounds	Nitrogen oxide; Nitrous acid; Nitrous oxide; Nitric oxide; Nitrogen dioxide; Dinitrogen tetroxide; Dinitrogen pentoxide; Nitrogen trioxide
- Except where otherwise noted, data are given for materials in their standard state (at 25 °C [77 °F], 100 kPa). verify (what is ?) Infobox references

Dinitrogen trioxide (also known as nitrous anhydride) is the inorganic compound with the formula N_{2}O_{3}. It is a nitrogen oxide. It forms upon mixing equal parts of nitric oxide and nitrogen dioxide and cooling the mixture below −21°C (−6°F):

^{•}NO + ^{•}NO_{2} ⇌ N_{2}O_{3}

Dinitrogen trioxide is only isolable at low temperatures (i.e., in the liquid and solid phases). In liquid and solid states, it has a deep blue color. At higher temperatures the equilibrium favors the constituent gases, with K_{D} = 193 kPa (25°C).

This compound is sometimes called "nitrogen trioxide", but this name properly refers to another compound, the (uncharged) nitrate radical •NO_{3}.

== Structure and bonding ==
The major isomer of dinitrogen trioxide molecule contains an N–N bond. One of the numerous resonant structures of the molecule of dinitrogen trioxide is O=N−NO_{2}, which can be described as a nitroso group −N=O attached to a nitro group −NO_{2} by a single bond between the two nitrogen atoms. Similar to nitronium nitrate, this molecule can also co-exist in equilibrium with an ionic gas called nitrosonium nitrite ([NO]^{+}[NO_{2}]^{–})

Typically, N–N bonds are similar in length to that in hydrazine (145 pm). Dinitrogen trioxide, however, has an unusually long N–N bond at 186 pm. Some other nitrogen oxides also possess long N–N bonds, including dinitrogen tetroxide (175 pm). The N_{2}O_{3} molecule is planar and exhibits C_{s} symmetry. The dimensions displayed on the picture below come from microwave spectroscopy of low-temperature, gaseous N_{2}O_{3}:

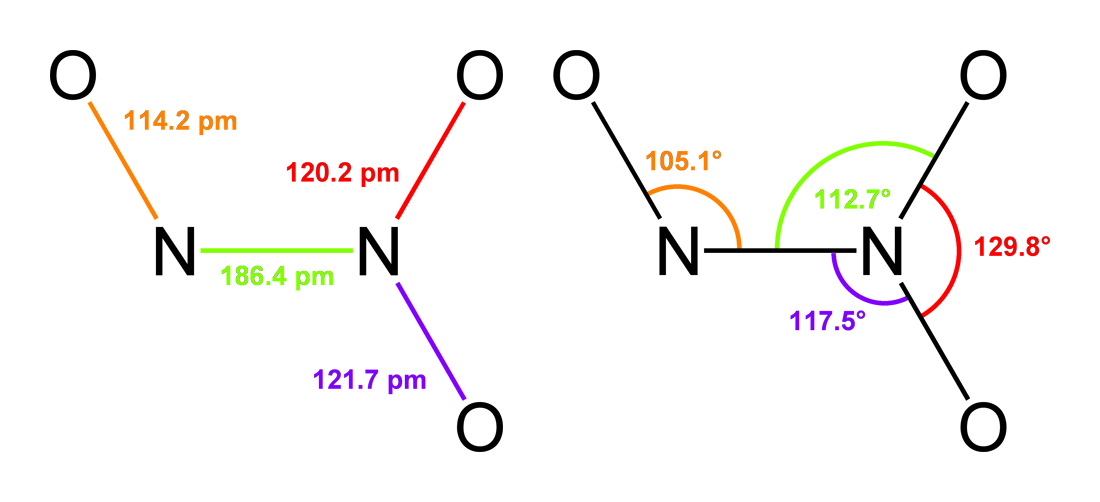
The bond lengths and angles of dinitrogen trioxide.

ON-NO_{2} is considered as the "anhydride" of the unstable nitrous acid (HNO_{2}), and produces it when mixed with water, although an alternative structure might be anticipated for the true anhydride of nitrous acid (i.e., O=N−O−N=O). That isomer can be produced from the reaction of tetrabutylammonium nitrite and triflic anhydride in dichloromethane solution at −30°C.
