= Nitronium tetrafluoroborate =

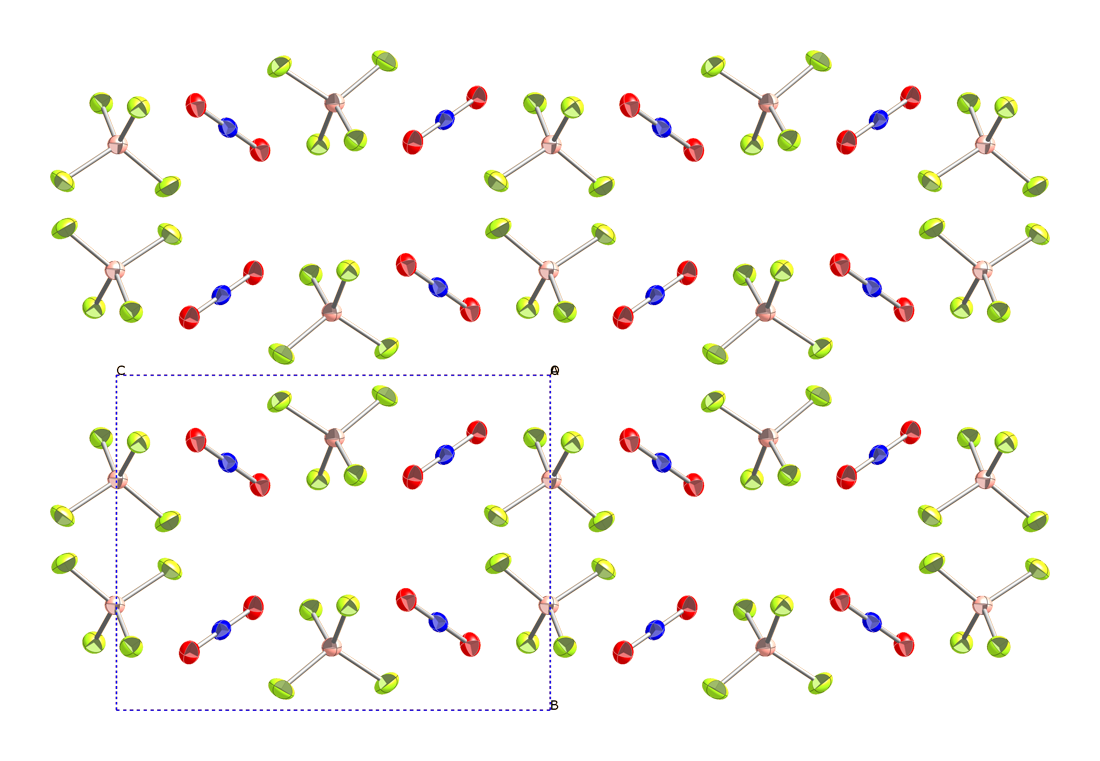

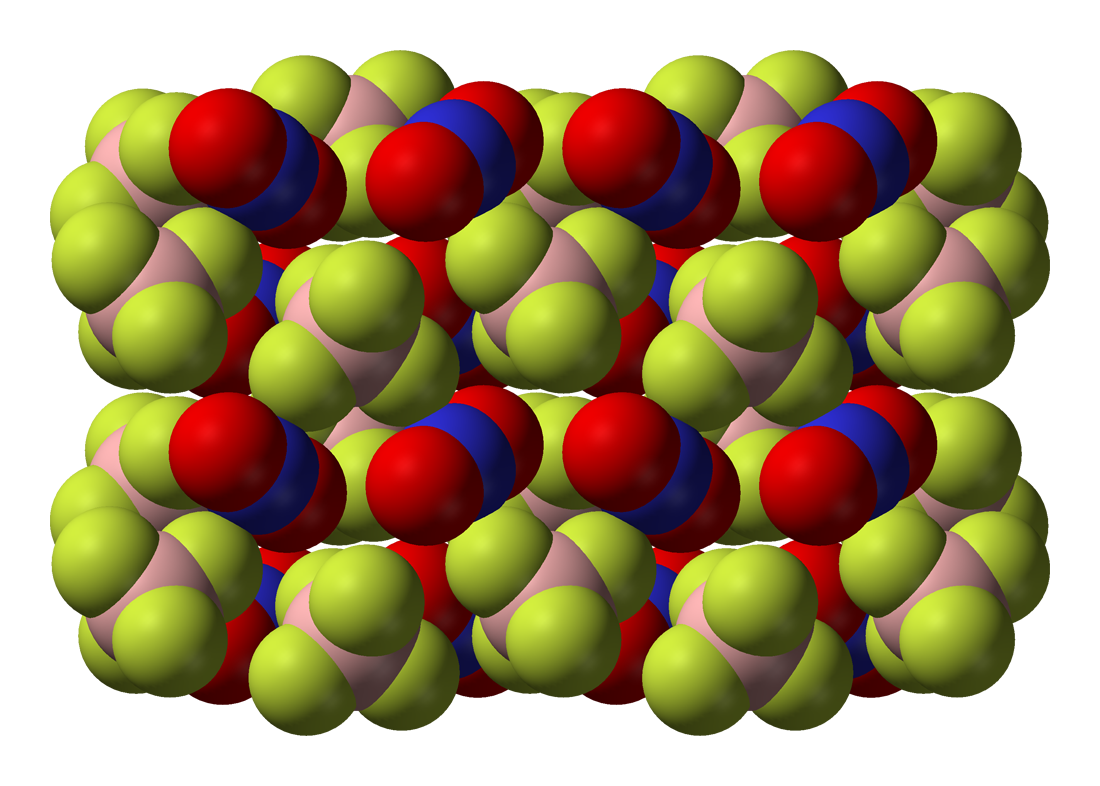

Names
- Other names nitronium fluoroborate

Identifiers
CAS Number	13826-86-3
3D model (JSmol)	Interactive image
ChemSpider	9248612
ECHA InfoCard	100.034.107
EC Number	237-533-5
PubChem CID	11073463
CompTox Dashboard (EPA)	DTXSID001014531
- InChI: InChI=1S/BF4.NO2/c2-1(3,4)5;2-1-3/q-1;+1 Key: RGVZMPONLYFINH-UHFFFAOYSA-N
- SMILES: [B-](F)(F)(F)F.[N+](=O)=O

Properties
Chemical formula	NO_{2}BF_{4}
Molar mass	132.81 g·mol^{−1}

Structure
Crystal structure	monoclinic
Space group	P21/c
Lattice constant	a = 6.5567 Å, b = 6.8243 Å, c = 9.1244 Å α = 90.0°, β = 104.40°, γ = 90.0°
Lattice volume (V)	395.44
Formula units (Z)	4

Hazards
- GHS labelling
Pictograms	(GHS05: Corrosive) (GHS07: Exclamation mark) (GHS08: Health hazard)
Signal word	Danger
Hazard statements	H314, H317, H334
Precautionary statements	P260, P264, P272, P280, P285, P301+P330+P331, P302+P352, P303+P361+P353, P304+P340, P304+P341, P305+P351+P338, P310, P321, P333+P313, P342+P311, P363, P405, P501
- Safety data sheet (SDS)

Related compounds
Other cations	Nitrosonium tetrafluoroborate
- Except where otherwise noted, data are given for materials in their standard state (at 25 °C [77 °F], 100 kPa). verify (what is ?) Infobox references

Nitronium tetrafluoroborate is an inorganic compound with formula NO_{2}BF_{4}. It is a salt of nitronium cation and tetrafluoroborate anion. It is a colorless crystalline solid, which reacts with water to form the corrosive acids hydrogen fluoride (HF) and nitric acid (HNO_{3}). As such, it must be handled under water-free conditions. It is sparsely soluble in many organic solvents.

== Preparation ==
Nitronium tetrafluoroborate can be prepared by adding a mixture of anhydrous hydrogen fluoride and boron trifluoride to a nitromethane solution of nitric acid or dinitrogen pentoxide (N_{2}O_{5}).

== Applications ==
Nitronium tetrafluoroborate is used in organic synthesis as an electrophilic nitrating agent and a mild oxidant.
