= Nitryl =

Nitrogen dioxide

Nitryl is the nitrogen dioxide (NO_{2}) moiety when it occurs in a larger compound as a univalent fragment. Examples include nitryl fluoride (NO_{2}F) and nitryl chloride (NO_{2}Cl).

Like nitrogen dioxide, the nitryl moiety contains a nitrogen atom with two bonds to the two oxygen atoms, and a third bond shared equally between the nitrogen and the two oxygen atoms. The nitrogen-centred radical is then free to form a bond with another univalent fragment (X) to produce an N−X bond, where X can be F, Cl, OH, etc.

In organic nomenclature, the nitryl moiety is known as the nitro group. For instance, nitryl benzene is normally called nitrobenzene (PhNO_{2}).

== See also ==
- Dinitrogen tetroxide
- Nitro compound
- Nitrosyl (R−N=O)
- Isocyanide (R−N≡C)
- Nitryl fluoride
- Nitrate
