= Nitrate radical =

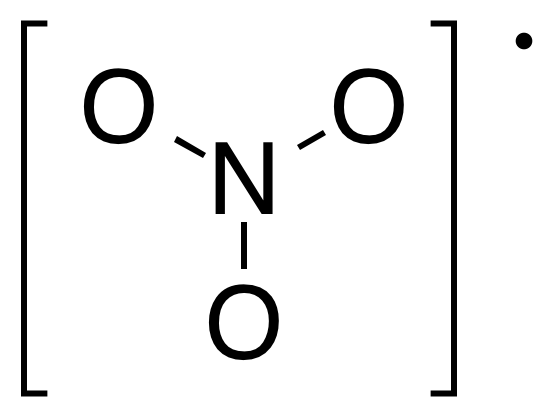

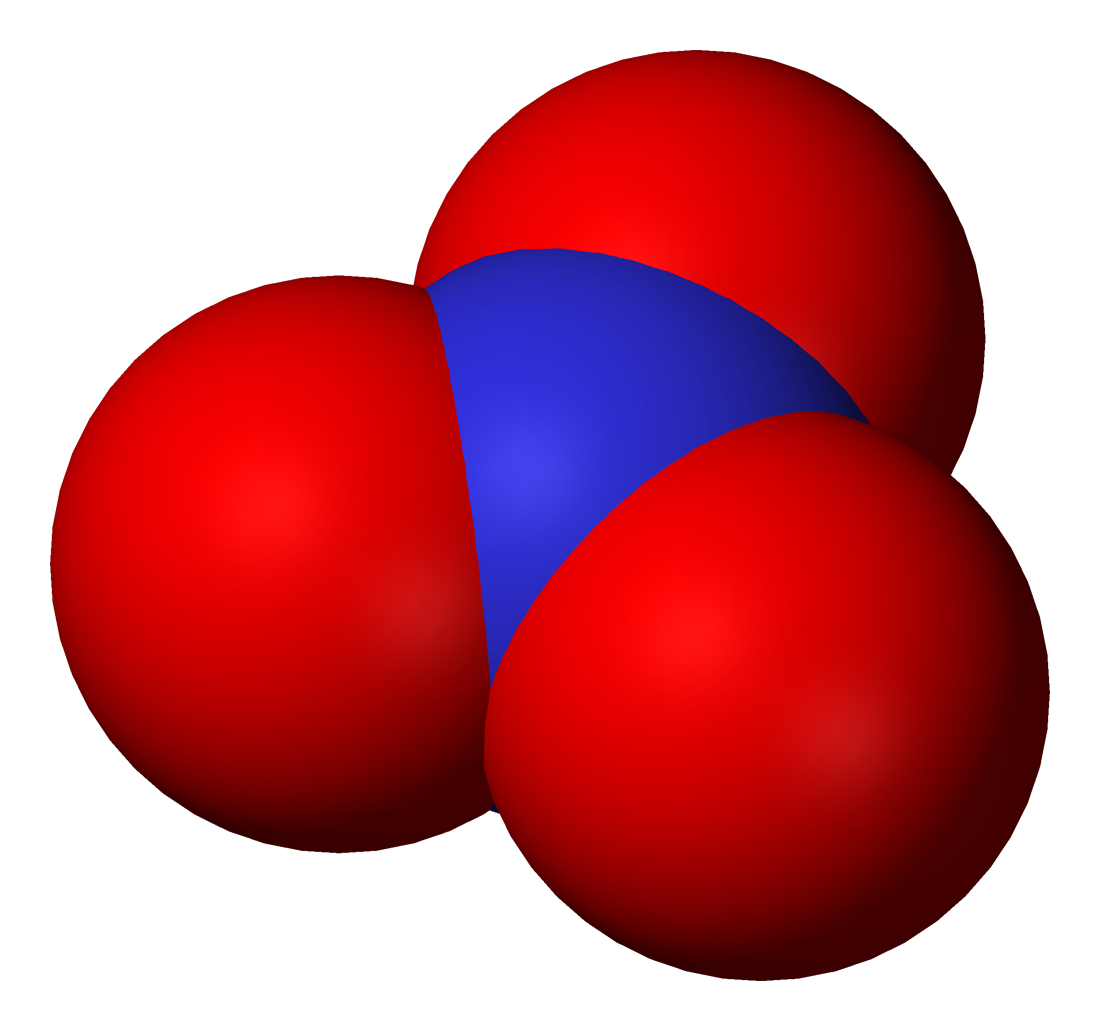

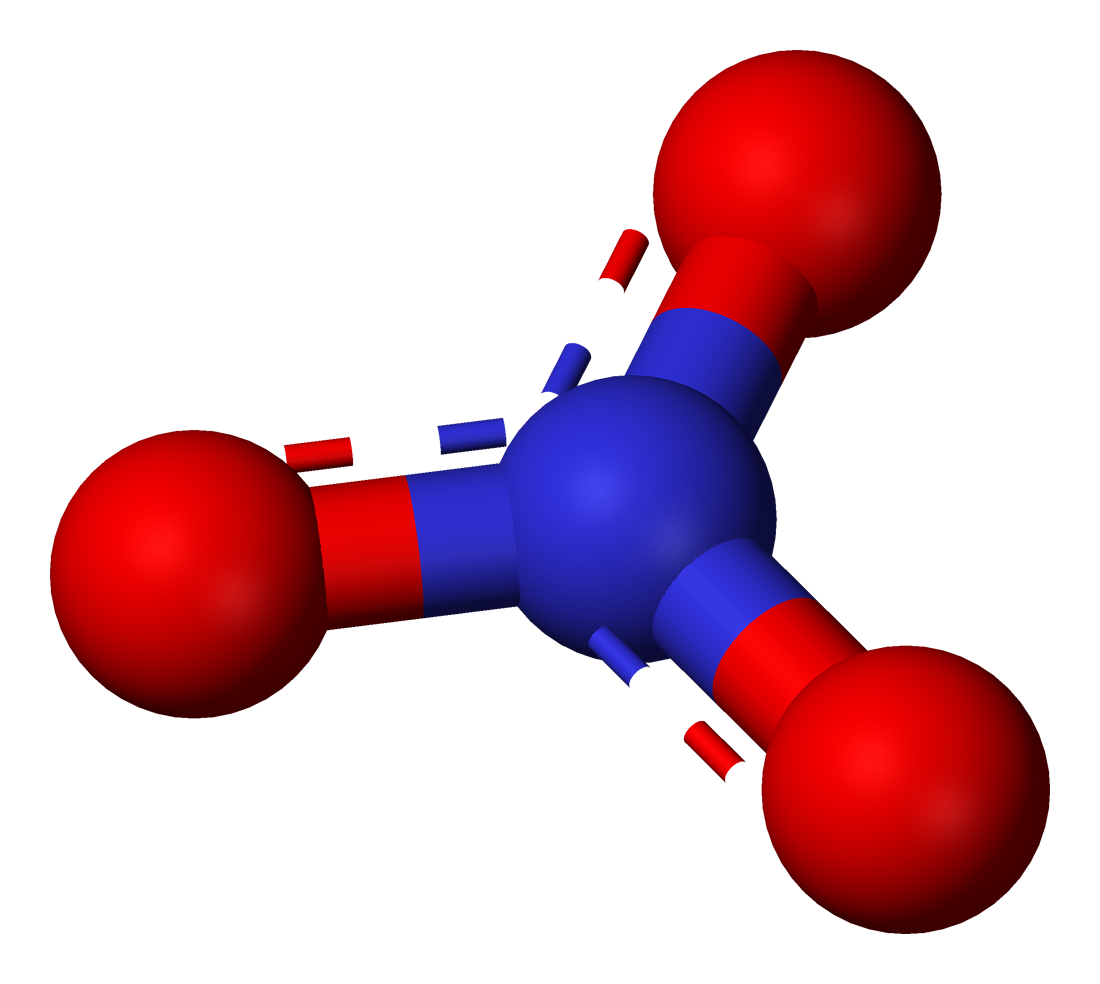

Names
- IUPAC name Nitrate radical
- Systematic IUPAC name Trioxidonitrogen(•)
- Other names Nitrooxy radical

Identifiers
CAS Number	12033-49-7
3D model (JSmol)	Interactive image
ChEBI	CHEBI:29329
ChemSpider	13268797
Gmelin Reference	1573
PubChem CID	5360456
CompTox Dashboard (EPA)	DTXSID201316935
- InChI: InChI=1S/NO3/c2-1(3)4 Key: YPJKMVATUPSWOH-UHFFFAOYSA-N
- SMILES: [N+](=O)([O-])[O]

Properties
Chemical formula	NO_{3}
Molar mass	62.004 g·mol^{−1}
- Except where otherwise noted, data are given for materials in their standard state (at 25 °C [77 °F], 100 kPa). Infobox references

Nitrogen trioxide or nitrate radical is an oxide of nitrogen with formula NO_{3}, consisting of three oxygen atoms covalently bound to a nitrogen atom. This highly unstable blue compound has not been isolated in pure form, but can be generated and observed as a short-lived component of gas, liquid, or solid systems.

Like nitrogen dioxide NO_{2}, it is a radical (a molecule with an unpaired valence electron), which makes it paramagnetic. It is the uncharged counterpart of the nitrate anion NO^{−}_{3} and an isomer of the peroxynitrite radical OONO.

Nitrogen trioxide is an important intermediate in reactions between atmospheric components, including the destruction of ozone.

== History ==
The existence of the NO_{3} radical was postulated in 1881–1882 by Hautefeuille and Chappuis to explain the absorption spectrum of air subjected to a silent electrical discharge.

== Structure and properties ==
The NO_{3} radical does not react with water.

The absorption spectrum of NO_{3} has a broad band for light with wavelengths from about 500 to 680 nm, with three maxima in the visible at 590, 662, and 623 nm. Absorption in the range 640–680 nm does not lead to dissociation but to fluorescence: specifically, from about 605 to 800 nm following excitation at 604.4 nm, and from about 662 to 800 nm following excitation at 661.8 nm. In water solution, another absorption band appears at about 330 nm (ultraviolet). An excited state NO^{*}_{3} can be achieved by photons of wavelength less than 595 nm.

== Preparation ==
Nitrogen trioxide can be prepared in the gas phase by mixing nitrogen dioxide and ozone:

NO_{2} + O_{3} → NO_{3} + O_{2}

This reaction can be performed also in the solid phase or water solutions, by irradiating frozen gas mixtures, flash photolysis and radiolysis of nitrate salts and nitric acid, and several other methods.

Nitrogen trioxide is a product of the photolysis of dinitrogen pentoxide N_{2}O_{5}, chlorine nitrate ClONO_{2}, and peroxynitric acid HO_{2}NO_{2} and its salts.

N_{2}O_{5} → NO_{2} + NO_{3}

2 ClONO_{2} → Cl_{2} + 2 NO_{3}

== Atmospheric occurrence ==
=== Formation at night ===
In the atmosphere, the formation of nitrate radical also occurs from the reaction:
$$\ce{NO2 + O3 -> NO3 + O2}$$
NO_{3} concentrations maximize during the night due to the absence of photolysis. In its nightly abundance, the nitrate radical can oxidize volatile organic compounds (VOCs).

When NO_{3} is formed, its subsequent reaction with nitrogen dioxide NO2 produces dinitrogen pentoxide N_{2}O_{5}, which serves as a reservoir for NO_{3}:
$$\ce{NO2 + NO3 + M -> N2O5 + M}$$

=== Reaction with VOCs ===
As a dominant nighttime oxidizing agent, NO_{3} reacts with a variety of VOCs, in which the mechanism and the rate of the reaction will depend on the species. As an example, oxygenates such as aldehydes are oxidized by abstracting an H-atom, resulting in nitric acid HNO_{3} as one of the products. The lifetime of NO_{3} in the presence of these compounds typically ranges from minutes to days.

Conversely, unsaturated hydrocarbons (e.g. alkenes) are commonly oxidized by adding the nitrate radical to a carbon double bond. The reaction rates with these species are higher compared to those of oxygenates, notably affecting the abundance of the unsaturated hydrocarbons. In forested areas, for instance, NO_{3} can rapidly oxidize biogenic volatile organic compounds (BVOCs), such as terpenes and isoprene, which have been studied to contribute as a source of secondary organic aerosols (SOAs).

=== Rapid daytime photolysis ===
The reaction that efficiently removes the nitrate radical from the troposphere during the day is its photolysis:
$$\ce{NO3 + hv -> NO2 + O}$$
$$\ce{NO3 + hv -> NO + O2}$$
in which the pathway followed will depend on the wavelength. When the sun is overhead, the photodissociation reaches maximum rates ranging from J = 0.02 to 0.2 s^{−1}. Therefore, the daytime lifetime of NO_{3} is usually less than 5 seconds.
