= Nitrosyl azide =

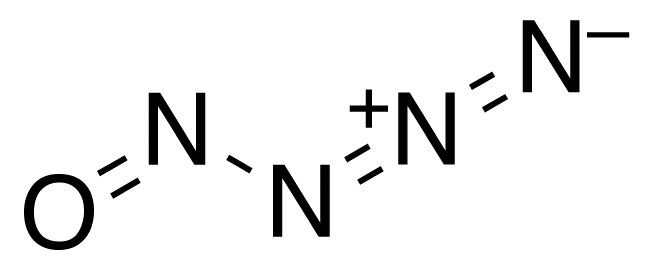

Identifiers
CAS Number	62316-46-5
3D model (JSmol)	Interactive image
ChemSpider	13917998
PubChem CID	18974641
CompTox Dashboard (EPA)	DTXSID401029641
- InChI: InChI=1S/N4O/c1-2-3-4-5 Key: LHKVDVFVJMYULK-UHFFFAOYSA-N
- SMILES: [N-]=[N+]=NN=O

Properties
Chemical formula	N_{3}−N=O
Molar mass	72.027 g·mol^{−1}
Appearance	Pale yellow solid below −50 °C (−58 °F). Above that temperature it decomposes.

Related compounds
Related compounds	Nitrogen monoxide; Nitrous oxide; Nitryl azide; Oxatetrazole
- Except where otherwise noted, data are given for materials in their standard state (at 25 °C [77 °F], 100 kPa). Infobox references

Nitrosyl azide is an inorganic compound of nitrogen and oxygen with the chemical formula N_{3}−N=O. It is a highly labile nitrogen oxide with the empirical formula N_{4}O.

== Synthesis ==
Nitrosyl azide can be synthesized via the following reaction of sodium azide and nitrosyl chloride at low temperatures:

== Properties ==
Below −50 °C, nitrosyl azide exists as a pale yellow solid. Above this temperature, it decomposes into nitrous oxide N_{2}O and molecular nitrogen N_{2}:

Characterization of the compound with IR and Raman spectroscopy show absorption bands that agree well with calculated values for a trans-structure. Quantum chemical calculations show a cis-form higher in energy by 4.2 kJ/mol and an aromatic ring form (oxatetrazole N_{4}O) that is more stable by 205 kJ/mol. However, the cyclization to the ring form would have to exceed the 205 kJ/mol activation energy barrier required to bend the azide group, which might explain why nitrosyl azide is stable enough to be isolated at low temperature.
