= Nitryl chloride =

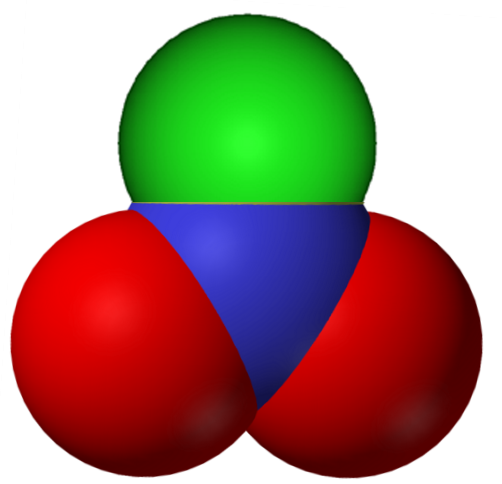
- Ball model of nitryl chloride

Identifiers
CAS Number	13444-90-1
3D model (JSmol)	Interactive image
ChEBI	CHEBI:142774
ChemSpider	10446393
PubChem CID	15431084
UNII	UJ70MC62I8
CompTox Dashboard (EPA)	DTXSID601317066
- InChI: InChI=1S/ClH.HNO2/c;2-1-3/h1H;1H/p-1 Key: HSSFHZJIMRUXDM-UHFFFAOYSA-M
- SMILES: [O-][N+](=O)Cl

Properties
Chemical formula	ClNO_{2}
Molar mass	81.46 g·mol^{−1}
Melting point	−145 °C (−229 °F; 128 K)
Boiling point	−15 °C (5 °F; 258 K)

Related compounds
Other anions	nitryl fluoride, nitryl bromide
Other cations	nitrosyl chloride, sulfuryl chloride
Related compounds	chloro nitrite, chlorine nitrate
- Except where otherwise noted, data are given for materials in their standard state (at 25 °C [77 °F], 100 kPa). Infobox references

Nitryl chloride is a volatile inorganic compound with formula ClNO_{2}. At standard conditions it is a gas.

== Formation ==
Nitryl chloride can be formed in the reaction of dinitrogen pentoxide with chlorides or hydrogen chloride:

N_{2}O_{5} + 2HCl → 2ClNO_{2} + H_{2}O
N_{2}O_{5} + NaCl → ClNO_{2} + NaNO_{3}

== Reactions ==
Nitryl chloride adds to olefins in a radical reaction.
