= Nitryl fluoride =

Nitryl fluoride
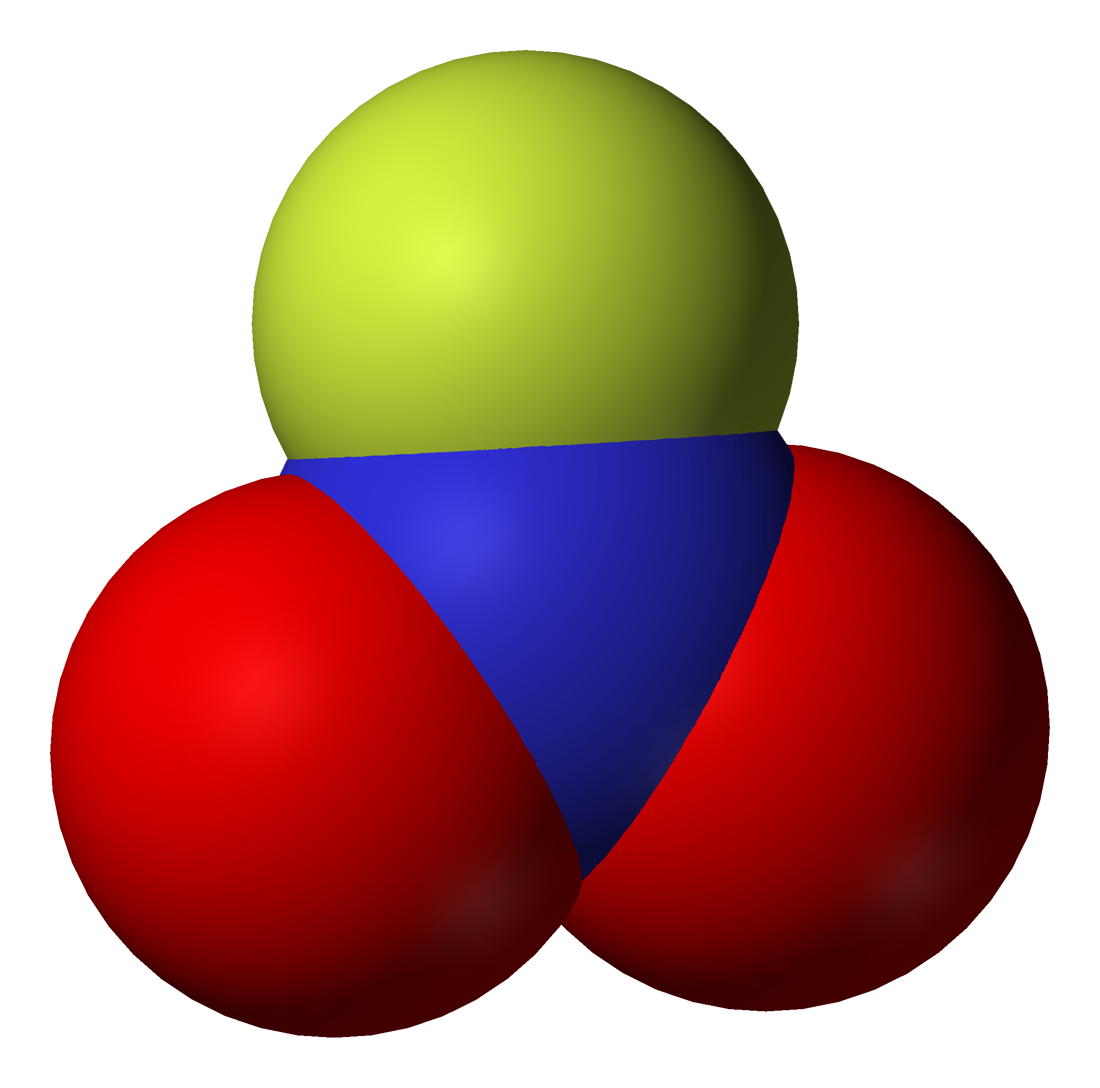
Nitryl fluoride

Identifiers
CAS Number	10022-50-1
3D model (JSmol)	Interactive image
ChemSpider	59588
ECHA InfoCard	100.030.007
EC Number	233-021-0
PubChem CID	66203
UNII	DAT2I9R64A
CompTox Dashboard (EPA)	DTXSID00143027
- InChI: InChI=1S/FNO2/c1-2(3)4 Key: JVJQPDTXIALXOG-UHFFFAOYSA-N; InChI=1/FNO2/c1-2(3)4 Key: JVJQPDTXIALXOG-UHFFFAOYAU
- SMILES: [N+](=O)([O-])F

Properties
Chemical formula	FNO_{2}
Molar mass	65.003 g·mol^{−1}
Melting point	−166 °C (−267 °F; 107 K)
Boiling point	−72 °C (−98 °F; 201 K)

Related compounds
Other anions	Nitryl chloride; Nitryl bromide
Other cations	Nitrosyl fluoride; Sulfuryl fluoride
- Except where otherwise noted, data are given for materials in their standard state (at 25 °C [77 °F], 100 kPa). verify (what is ?) Infobox references

Nitryl fluoride is a colourless gas and strong oxidizing agent, which is used as a fluorinating agent and has been proposed as an oxidiser in rocket propellants (though never flown). Its formula is NO_{2}F.

It is a molecular species, not ionic, consistent with its low boiling point. The structure features planar nitrogen with a short N-F bond length of 135 pm.

== Preparation ==
Henri Moissan and Paul Lebeau recorded the preparation of nitryl fluoride in 1905 by the fluorination of nitrogen dioxide. This reaction is highly exothermic, which leads to contaminated products. The simplest method avoids fluorine gas but uses cobalt(III) fluoride:

NO_{2} + CoF_{3} → NO_{2}F + CoF_{2}

The CoF_{2} can be regenerated to CoF_{3}. Other methods have been described.

== Thermodynamic properties ==
The thermodynamic properties of this gas were determined by IR and Raman spectroscopy. The standard heat of formation of FNO_{2} is −19 ± 2 kcal/mol, but the compound becomes increasingly unstable at higher temperature. The homogeneous thermal decomposition cannot be studied at temperatures below 1200 kelvin, because the notional unimolecular decomposition equilibrium lies on the adduct side by at least six orders of magnitude at 500 kelvin, and two orders of magnitude at 1000 kelvin.

The dissociation energy of 46.0 kcal of the N-F bond in nitryl fluoride is about 18 kcal less than the normal N-F single bond energy. This can be attributed to the “reorganization energy” of the NO_{2} radical; that is, the NO_{2} radical in FNO_{2} is less stable than the free NO_{2} molecule. Qualitatively speaking, the odd electron “used up” in the N-F bond forms a resonating three-electron bond in free NO_{2}, thus stabilizing the molecule with a gain of 18 kcal.

== Reactions ==
Nitryl fluoride can be used to prepare organic nitro compounds and nitrate esters.

== See also ==
- Nitryl
