= Nitrogen dioxide =

Compound containing nitrogen and oxygen

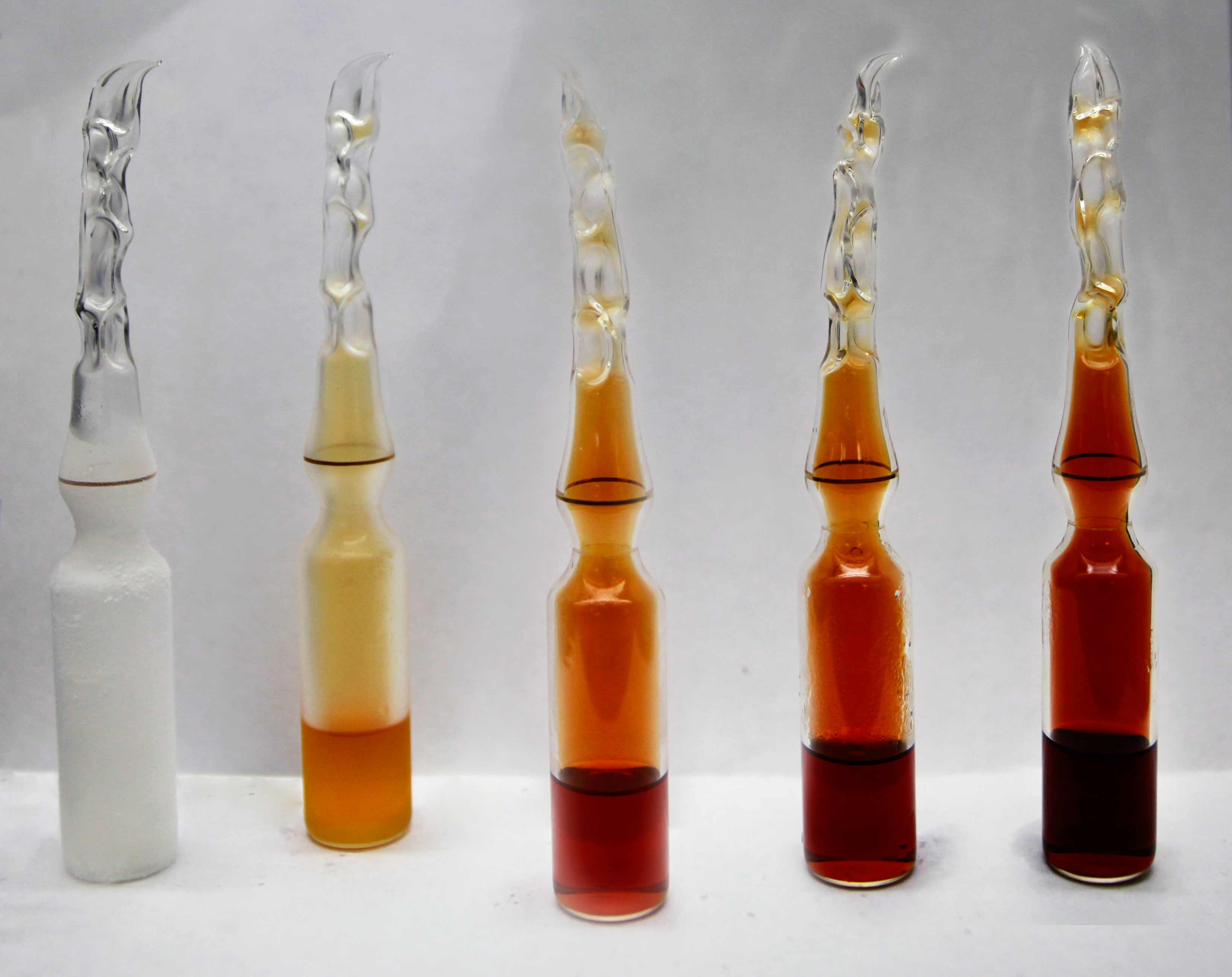
- Nitrogen dioxide (NO_{2}) at −196 °C, 0 °C, 23 °C, 35 °C, and 50 °C. NO_{2} converts to the colorless dinitrogen tetroxide (N_{2}O_{4}) at low temperatures, and reverts to NO_{2} at higher temperatures.

Skeletal formula of nitrogen dioxide with some measurementsEP
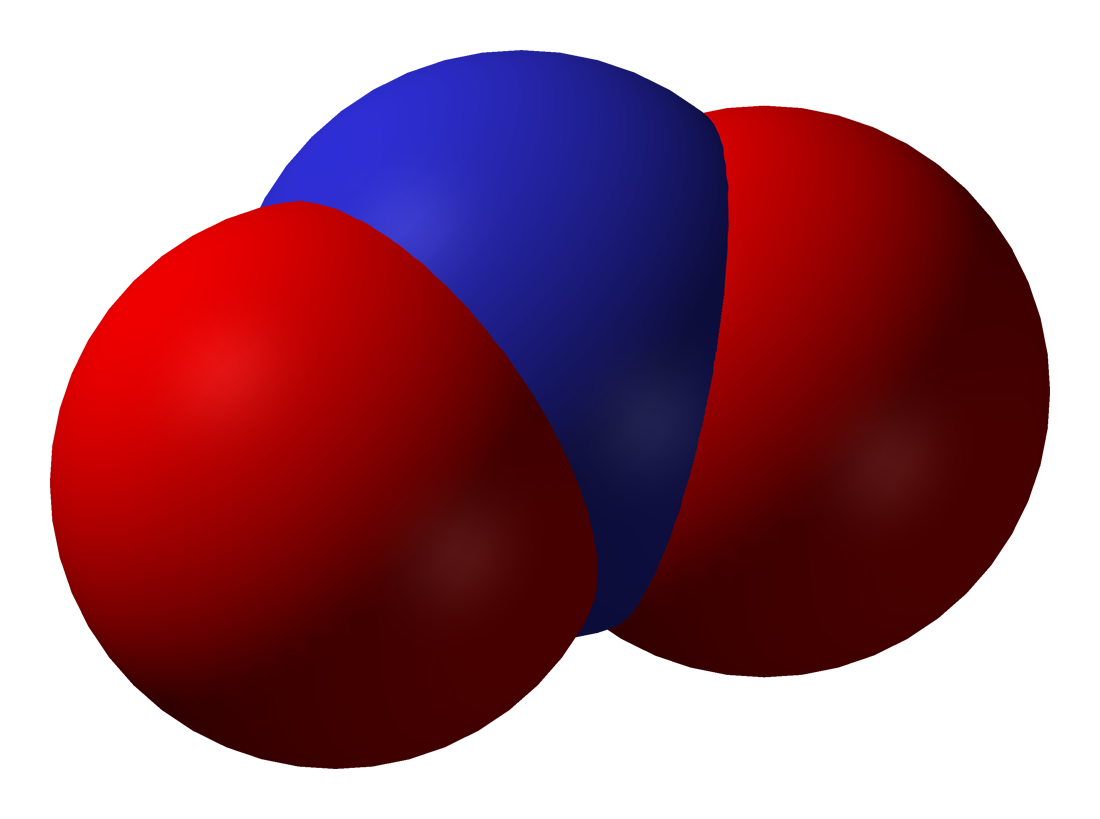
Spacefill model of nitrogen dioxide

Names
- IUPAC name Nitrogen dioxide
- Other names Nitrogen(IV) oxide, deutoxide of nitrogen

Identifiers
CAS Number	10102-44-0
3D model (JSmol)	Interactive image; Interactive image
ChEBI	CHEBI:33101
ChemSpider	2297499
ECHA InfoCard	100.030.234
EC Number	233-272-6
Gmelin Reference	976
PubChem CID	3032552
RTECS number	QW9800000
UNII	S7G510RUBH
UN number	1067
CompTox Dashboard (EPA)	DTXSID7020974
- InChI: InChI=1S/NO2/c2-1-3 Key: JCXJVPUVTGWSNB-UHFFFAOYSA-N; InChI=1/NO2/c2-1-3 Key: JCXJVPUVTGWSNB-UHFFFAOYAA
- SMILES: N(=O)[O]; [N+](=O)[O-]

Properties
Chemical formula	NO^{•}_{2}
Molar mass	46.005 g·mol^{−1}
Appearance	Reddish-brown gas
Odor	Chlorine-like
Density	1.880 g/L
Melting point	−9.3 °C (15.3 °F; 263.8 K)
Boiling point	21.15 °C (70.07 °F; 294.30 K)
Solubility in water	Hydrolyses
Solubility	Soluble in CCl_{4}, nitric acid, chloroform
Vapor pressure	98.80 kPa (at 20 °C)
Magnetic susceptibility (χ)	+150.0·10^{−6} cm^{3}/mol
Refractive index (n_{D})	1.449 (at 20 °C)

Structure
Point group	C_{2v}
Molecular shape	Bent

Thermochemistry
Heat capacity (C)	37.2 J/(mol·K)
Std molar entropy (S^{⦵}_{298})	240.1 J/(mol·K)
Std enthalpy of formation (Δ_{f}H^{⦵}_{298})	+33.2 kJ/mol

Hazards
- Occupational safety and health (OHS/OSH)
Main hazards	Poison, oxidizer
- GHS labelling
Pictograms	(GHS03: Oxidizing) (GHS05: Corrosive) (GHS06: Toxic)
Signal word	Danger
Hazard statements	H270, H314, H330
Precautionary statements	P220, P260, P280, P284, P305+P351+P338, P310
NFPA 704 (fire diamond)	3 0 0 OX
- Lethal dose or concentration (LD, LC)
LC_{50} (median concentration)	30 ppm (guinea pig, 1 h); 315 ppm (rabbit, 15 min); 68 ppm (rat, 4 h); 138 ppm (rat, 30 min); 1000 ppm (mouse, 10 min)
LC_{Lo} (lowest published)	64 ppm (dog, 8 h); 64 ppm (monkey, 8 h)
- NIOSH (US health exposure limits)
PEL (Permissible)	C 5 ppm (9 mg/m^{3})
REL (Recommended)	ST 1 ppm (1.8 mg/m^{3})
IDLH (Immediate danger)	13 ppm
Safety data sheet (SDS)	ICSC 0930

Related compounds
Related nitrogen oxides	Dinitrogen pentoxide Dinitrogen tetroxide Dinitrogen trioxide Nitric oxide Nitrous oxide
Related compounds	Chlorine dioxide Carbon dioxide
- Except where otherwise noted, data are given for materials in their standard state (at 25 °C [77 °F], 100 kPa). verify (what is ?) Infobox references

Nitrogen dioxide is a chemical compound with the formula NO_{2}. One of several nitrogen oxides, nitrogen dioxide is a reddish-brown gas. It is a paramagnetic, bent molecule with C_{2v} point group symmetry. Industrially, NO_{2} is an intermediate in the synthesis of nitric acid, millions of tons of which are produced each year, primarily for the production of fertilizers. It is a free radical.

Nitrogen dioxide is poisonous and can be fatal if inhaled in large quantities. Cooking with a gas stove produces nitrogen dioxide which causes poorer indoor air quality. Combustion of gas can lead to increased concentrations of nitrogen dioxide throughout the home environment which is linked to respiratory issues and diseases. The LC_{50} (median lethal dose) for humans has been estimated to be 174 ppm for a 1-hour exposure. It is also included in the NO_{x} family of atmospheric pollutants.

== Properties ==
Nitrogen dioxide is a reddish-brown gas with a pungent, acrid odor above 21.2 °C (70.2 °F; 294.3 K) and becomes a yellowish-brown liquid below 21.2 °C (70.2 °F; 294.3 K). It forms an equilibrium with its dimer, dinitrogen tetroxide (N_{2}O_{4}), and converts almost entirely to N_{2}O_{4} below −11.2 °C (11.8 °F; 261.9 K).

The bond length between the nitrogen atom and the oxygen atom is 119.7 pm. This bond length is consistent with a bond order between one and two. Nitrogen dioxide is a doublet state.

== Preparation ==
Industrially, nitrogen dioxide is produced and transported as its cryogenic liquid dimer, dinitrogen tetroxide. It is produced industrially by the oxidation of ammonia, the Ostwald Process. This reaction is the first step in the production of nitric acid:

4 NH_{3} + 7 O_{2} → 4 NO_{2} + 6 H_{2}O

It can also be produced by the oxidation of nitrosyl chloride:

2 NOCl + O_{2} → 2NO_{2} + Cl_{2}

Instead, most laboratory syntheses stabilize and then heat the nitric acid to accelerate the decomposition. For example, the thermal decomposition of some metal nitrates generates NO_{2}:

Pb(NO_{3})_{2} → PbO + 2 NO_{2} + 1/2 O_{2}

Alternatively, dehydration of nitric acid produces nitronium nitrate...

2 HNO_{3} → N_{2}O_{5} + H_{2}O
6 HNO_{3} + 1/2 P_{4}O_{10} → 3 N_{2}O_{5} + 2 H_{3}PO_{4}

...which subsequently undergoes thermal decomposition:

N_{2}O_{5} → 2 NO_{2} + 1/2 O_{2}

NO_{2} is generated by the reduction of concentrated nitric acid with a metal (such as copper):

4 HNO_{3} + Cu → Cu(NO_{3})_{2} + 2 NO_{2} + 2 H_{2}O

Nitric acid decomposes slowly to nitrogen dioxide by the overall reaction:

4 HNO_{3} → 4 NO_{2} + 2 H_{2}O + O_{2}

The nitrogen dioxide so formed confers the characteristic yellow color often exhibited by this acid. However, the reaction is too slow to be a practical source of NO_{2}.

== Selected reactions ==
Nitrogen dioxide interconverts to other N-O compounds. At low temperatures, NO_{2} reversibly converts to the colourless gas dinitrogen tetroxide (N_{2}O_{4}):

2 NO_{2} ⇌ N_{2}O_{4}

The exothermic equilibrium has enthalpy change ΔH = −57.23 kJ/mol.

At 150 °C (302 °F; 423 K), NO_{2} decomposes with release of oxygen via an endothermic process (ΔH = 14 kJ/mol):

2 NO_{2} →2 NO + O_{2}

Nitric oxide combines with nitrogen dioxide to reversibly give dinitrogen trioxide:

NO + NO_{2} ⇌ N_{2}O_{3}

This reaction is a step in the lead chamber process for producing sulfuric acid from sulfur dioxide. Absorption of light at wavelengths shorter than about 400 nm results in photolysis to form NO + O (atomic oxygen). In the atmosphere the addition of the oxygen atom so formed to O_{2} results in ozone.

=== Hydrolysis ===
NO_{2} reacts with water to give nitric acid and nitrous acid:

2NO_{2} + H_{2}O → HNO_{3} + HNO_{2}

The nitrous acid further degrades to nitric acid and nitric oxide.

These reactions underpin the Ostwald process for the industrial production of nitric acid from ammonia. This reaction is negligibly slow at low concentrations of NO_{2} characteristic of the ambient atmosphere, although it does proceed upon NO_{2} uptake to surfaces. Such surface reaction is thought to produce gaseous HNO_{2} (often written as HONO) in outdoor and indoor environments.

=== Conversion to nitrates ===
NO_{2} is used to generate anhydrous metal nitrates from the oxides:

MO + 3 NO_{2} → M(NO_{3})_{2} + NO

Alkyl and metal iodides give the corresponding nitrates:

TiI_{4} + 8 NO_{2} → Ti(NO_{3})_{4} + 4 NO + 2 I_{2}

=== With organic compounds ===
The reactivity of nitrogen dioxide toward organic compounds has long been known. For example, it reacts with amides to give N-nitroso derivatives. It is used for nitrations under anhydrous conditions.

== Uses ==
NO_{2} is used as an intermediate in the manufacturing of nitric acid, as a nitrating agent in the manufacturing of chemical explosives, as a polymerization inhibitor for acrylates, as a flour bleaching agent, and as a room temperature sterilization agent. It is also used as an oxidizer in rocket fuel, for example in red fuming nitric acid; it was used in the Titan rockets, to launch Project Gemini, in the maneuvering thrusters of the Space Shuttle, and in uncrewed space probes sent to various planets.

== Environmental presence ==
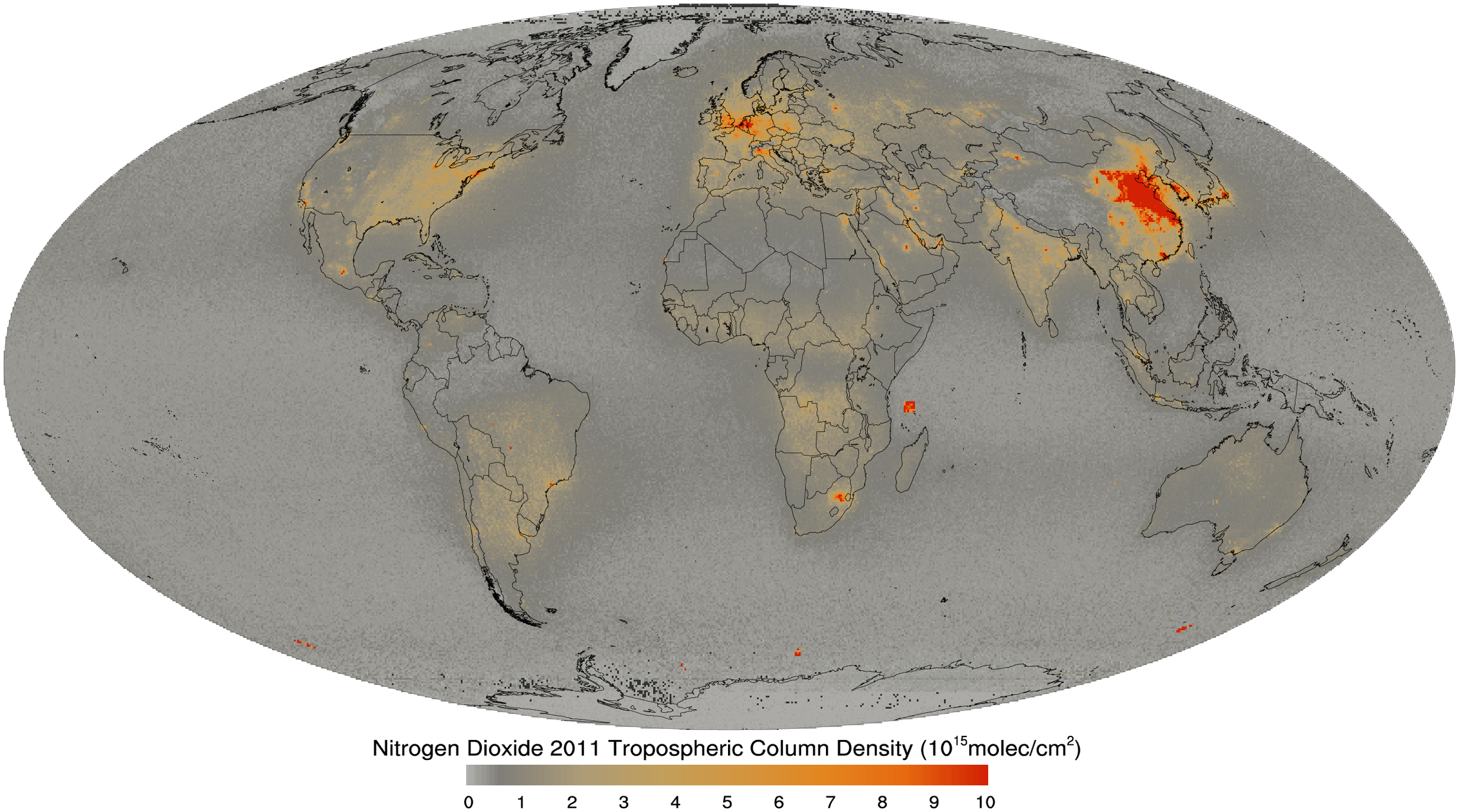
Nitrogen dioxide tropospheric column density in 2011.

Nitrogen dioxide typically arises via the oxidation of nitric oxide by oxygen in air (e.g. as result of corona discharge):

2 NO + O_{2} → 2 NO_{2}

NO_{2} is introduced into the environment by natural causes, including entry from the stratosphere, bacterial respiration, volcanos, and lightning. These sources make NO_{2} a trace gas in the atmosphere of Earth, where it plays a role in absorbing sunlight and regulating the chemistry of the troposphere, especially in determining ozone concentrations.

=== Anthropogenic sources ===
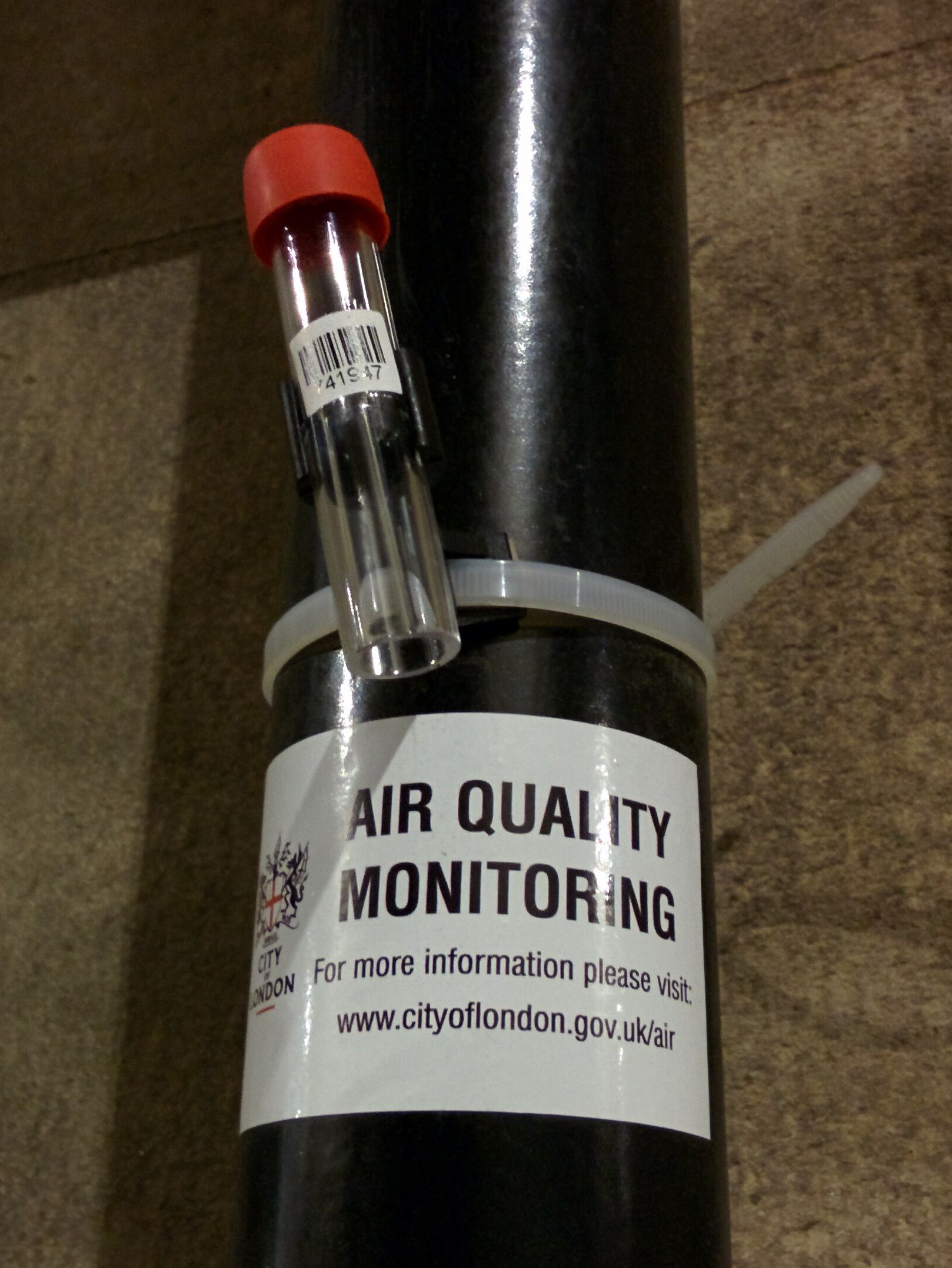
Nitrogen dioxide diffusion tube for air quality monitoring in the City of London.

Nitrogen dioxide also forms in most combustion processes. At elevated temperatures nitrogen combines with oxygen to form nitrogen dioxide:

N_{2} + 2 O_{2} → 2 NO_{2}

For the general public, the most prominent sources of NO_{2} are internal combustion engines, as combustion temperatures are high enough to thermally combine some of the nitrogen and oxygen in the air to form NO_{2}. Nitrogen dioxide accounts for a small fraction (generally well under 0.1) of NOx auto emissions.

Outdoors, NO_{2} can be a result of traffic from motor vehicles. Indoors, exposure arises from cigarette smoke, and butane and kerosene heaters and stoves. Indoor exposure levels of NO_{2} are, on average, at least three times higher in homes with gas stoves compared to electric stoves.

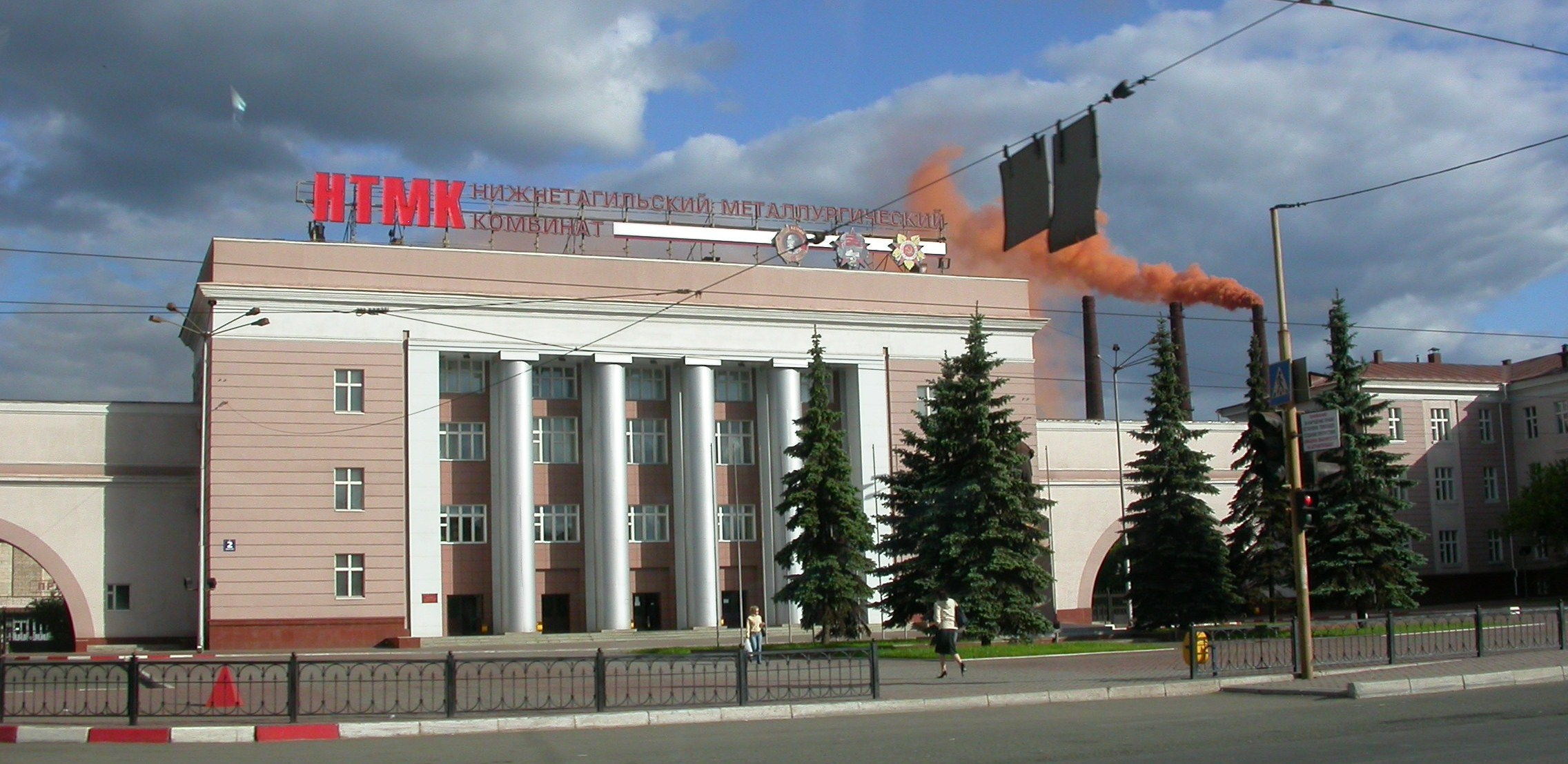
A "fox tail" over Nizhniy Tagil Iron and Steel Works

Workers in industries where NO_{2} is used are also exposed and are at risk for occupational lung diseases, and NIOSH has set exposure limits and safety standards. Workers in high voltage areas especially those with spark or plasma creation are at risk. Agricultural workers can be exposed to NO_{2} arising from grain decomposing in silos; chronic exposure can lead to lung damage in a condition called "silo-filler's disease".

== Toxicity ==
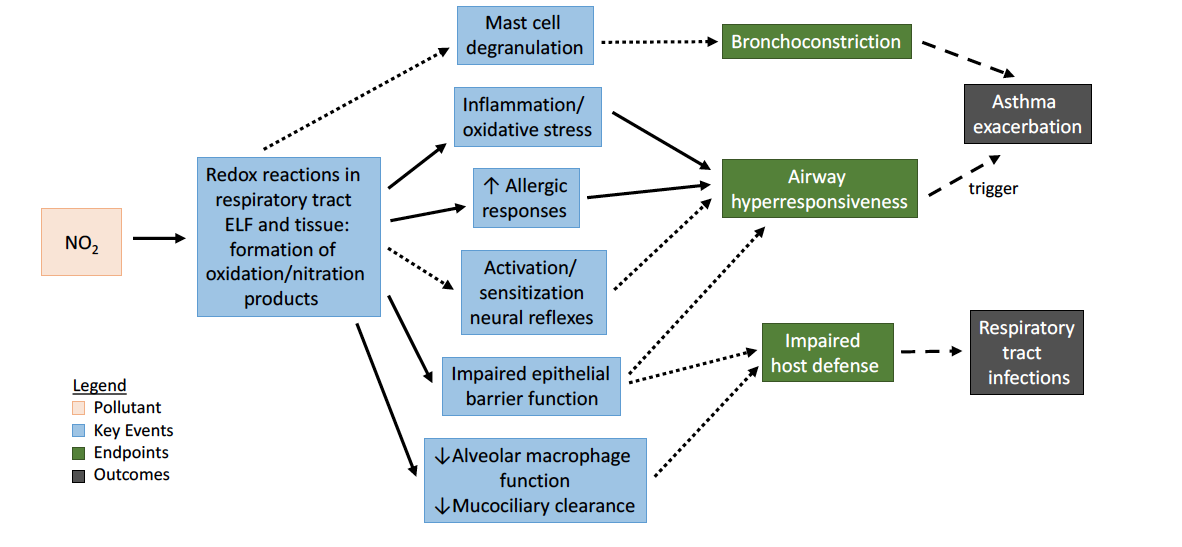
Possible pathways implicated in long-term nitrogen dioxide exposure. Dotted lines indicate findings only supported by animal studies, while solid lines indicate findings from controlled human exposure studies. Dashed lines indicate speculative links to asthma exacerbation and respiratory tract infections. ELF = epithelial lining fluid.

NO_{2} diffuses into the epithelial lining fluid (ELF) of the respiratory epithelium and dissolves. There, it chemically reacts with antioxidant and lipid molecules in the ELF. The health effects of NO_{2} are caused by the reaction products or their metabolites, which are reactive nitrogen species and reactive oxygen species that can drive bronchoconstriction, inflammation, reduced immune response, and may have effects on the heart.

=== Acute exposure ===
Acute harm due to NO_{2} exposure is rare. 100–200 ppm can cause mild irritation of the nose and throat, 250–500 ppm can cause edema, leading to bronchitis or pneumonia, and levels above 1000 ppm can cause death due to asphyxiation from fluid in the lungs. There are often no symptoms at the time of exposure other than transient cough, fatigue or nausea, but over hours inflammation in the lungs causes edema.

For skin or eye exposure, the affected area is flushed with saline. For inhalation, oxygen is administered, bronchodilators may be administered, and if there are signs of methemoglobinemia, a condition that arises when nitrogen-based compounds affect the hemoglobin in red blood cells, methylene blue may be administered.

It is classified as an extremely hazardous substance in the United States as defined in Section 302 of the U.S. Emergency Planning and Community Right-to-Know Act (42 U.S.C. 11002), and it is subject to strict reporting requirements by facilities which produce, store, or use it in significant quantities.

=== Long-term ===
Exposure to low levels of NO_{2} over time can cause changes in lung function. Cooking with a gas stove is associated with poorer indoor air quality. Combustion of gas can lead to increased concentrations of nitrogen dioxide throughout the home environment which is linked to respiratory issues and diseases. Children exposed to NO_{2} are more likely to be admitted to hospital with asthma.

In 2019, the Court of Justice of the EU, found that France did not comply with the limit values of the EU air quality standards applicable to the concentrations of nitrogen dioxide (NO_{2}) in 12 air quality zones.

== Environmental effects ==
Interaction of NO_{2} and other NO_{x} with water, oxygen and other chemicals in the atmosphere can form acid rain which harms sensitive ecosystems such as lakes and forests. Elevated levels of NO_{2} can also harm vegetation, decreasing growth, and reduce crop yields.

== See also ==
- Dinitrogen tetroxide (N_{2}O_{4})
- Nitric oxide (NO) – pollutant that is short lived because it converts to NO_{2} in the presence of ozone
- Nitrite (NO^{−}_{2})
- Nitrous oxide (N_{2}O) – "laughing gas", a linear molecule, isoelectronic with CO_{2} but with a nonsymmetric arrangement of atoms (NNO)
- Nitryl

== Cited sources ==
- Haynes, William M., ed. (2011). CRC Handbook of Chemistry and Physics (92nd ed.). CRC Press. ISBN 978-1-4398-5511-9.
