= Aluminium perchlorate =

Names
- Other names: Aluminium triperchlorate

Identifiers
CAS Number	14452-39-2; nonahydrate: 81029-06-3
3D model (JSmol)	Interactive image; nonahydrate: Interactive image
ChemSpider	140453; nonahydrate: 17339508
ECHA InfoCard	100.034.927
EC Number	238-437-6
PubChem CID	159740; nonahydrate: 16211522
UNII	MTO74513XK
CompTox Dashboard (EPA)	DTXSID60890742
- InChI: Key: ZRGUXTGDSGGHLR-UHFFFAOYSA-K; InChI=1S/Al.3ClHO4/c;3*2-1(3,4)5/h;3*(H,2,3,4,5)/q+3;;;/p-3; nonahydrate: InChI=1S/Al.3ClHO4.9H2O/c;3*2-1(3,4)5;;;;;;;;;/h;3*(H,2,3,4,5);9*1H2/q+3;;;;;;;;;;;;/p-3 Key: CYRDFMGMNQJULY-UHFFFAOYSA-K
- SMILES: [O-]Cl(=O)(=O)=O.[O-]Cl(=O)(=O)=O.[O-]Cl(=O)(=O)=O.[Al+3]; nonahydrate: [O-]Cl(=O)(=O)=O.[O-]Cl(=O)(=O)=O.[O-]Cl(=O)(=O)=O.[Al+3].O.O.O.O.O.O.O.O.O

Properties
Chemical formula	Al(ClO_{4})_{3}
Molar mass	325.33 g/mol (anhydrous); 487.46 g/mol (nonahydrate)
Appearance	White solid
Density	2.30 g/cm^{3} (anhydrous); 1.86 g/cm^{3} (nonahydrate)
Melting point	82 °C (180 °F; 355 K) (nonahydrate, decomposition)
Solubility in water	nonahydrate 180.4 g/100 mL (0 °C); 209.6 g/100 mL (25 °C)
Solubility	Soluble in ethanol, insoluble in chloroform and dichloromethane

Structure
Crystal structure	Trigonal
Space group	R3̅c
Lattice constant	a = 10.12 Å α = 106.7°, β = 106.7°, γ = 106.7°
Lattice volume (V)	869.5 Å^{3}

Thermochemistry
Std enthalpy of formation (Δ_{f}H^{⦵}_{298})	–571.1 kJ/mol

Hazards
- GHS labelling
Pictograms	(GHS03: Oxidizing) (GHS05: Corrosive)
Signal word	Danger
Hazard statements	H272, H314
Precautionary statements	P210, P220, P260, P264, P280, P301+P330+P331, P302+P361+P354, P304+P340, P305+P354+P338, P316, P321, P363, P370+P378, P405, P501
NFPA 704 (fire diamond)	3 0 0 OX

Related compounds
Other anions	Aluminium nitrate
Other cations	Gallium perchlorate Indium perchlorate
- Except where otherwise noted, data are given for materials in their standard state (at 25 °C [77 °F], 100 kPa). Infobox references

Aluminium perchlorate is an inorganic chemical compound of aluminium with the formula Al(ClO_{4})_{3}·nH_{2}O, where n can range from 0 to 9. It is most commonly found as the nonahydrate Al(ClO_{4})_{3}·9H_{2}O, but other hydrates, such as the trihydrate, have also been reported. All forms of aluminium perchlorate are hygroscopic white solids that are soluble in water.

== Preparation ==
The nonahydrate is produced by the dissolution of aluminium hydroxide in aqueous perchloric acid, followed by the evaporation of the solution:

Al(OH)_{3} + 3 HClO_{4} → Al(ClO_{4})_{3} + 3 H_{2}O

The dehydration of the nonahydrate by heating at 82 °C produces a basic perchlorate. However, heating at 80 °C under vacuum produces the trihydrate. Further heating of the trihydrate does not form the anhydrous form; instead, it decomposes to aluminium oxide.

Anhydrous aluminium perchlorate is produced by the reaction of aluminium chloride and dichlorine hexoxide at –20 °C:

8 Cl_{2}O_{6} + 2 AlCl_{3} → 2 ClO_{2}Al(ClO_{4})_{4} + 6 ClO_{2} + 3 Cl_{2}

The resulting ClO_{2}Al(ClO_{4})_{4} is then heated to 90 °C under vacuum to yield anhydrous aluminium perchlorate.

== Structure ==
The nonahydrate, structurally [Al(H_{2}O)_{6}](ClO_{4})_{3}(H_{2}O)_{3}, has a trigonal crystal structure and consists of octahedral [Al(H_{2}O)_{6}]^{3+} centers as well as perchlorate and three molecules of water of crystallization.

The anhydrous form, on the other hand, consists of bidentate perchlorate ligands with a hexagonal crystal lattice.

== Reactions and complexes ==
Aluminium perchlorate dissolves in water to form discrete [Al(H_{2}O)_{6}]^{3+} and ClO_{4}^{–} ions. The [Al(H_{2}O)_{6}]^{3+} partially hydrolyses, similar to the hexaaquoiron(III) ion:

[Al(H_{2}O)_{6}]^{3+} ⇌ [Al(H_{2}O)_{5}OH]^{2+} + H^{+}

This can be suppressed by the addition of perchloric acid. Like other aqueous Al^{3+} solutions, the addition of base, such as ammonium hydroxide or sodium hydroxide results in the precipitation of aluminium hydroxide; when base is further added, the precipitate redissolves to form [Al(OH)_{4}]^{–}.

The hydrates, the tri- and nonahydrate, are soluble in various organic solvents and are used to prepare multiple complexes with organic ligands, such as pyridine, dimethylacetamide, dimethyl sulfoxide, and acetonitrile. Specifically, the dimethyl sulfoxide complex, [Al(DMSO)_{6}](ClO_{4})_{3} is explosive. Other aluminium perchlorate complexes tetraperchloratoaluminate and hexaperchloratoaluminate are also known.

Anhydrous aluminium perchlorate decomposes when heated to 160 °C to Al_{2}O(ClO_{4})_{4}:

4 Al(ClO_{4})_{3} → 2 Al_{2}O(ClO_{4})_{4} + 2 Cl_{2} + 7 O_{2}

The oxyperchlorate decomposes to aluminium oxide if further heated to 450 °C.

== See also ==
- Tetraperchloratoaluminate
- Hexaperchloratoaluminate
