= Lead(II) perchlorate =

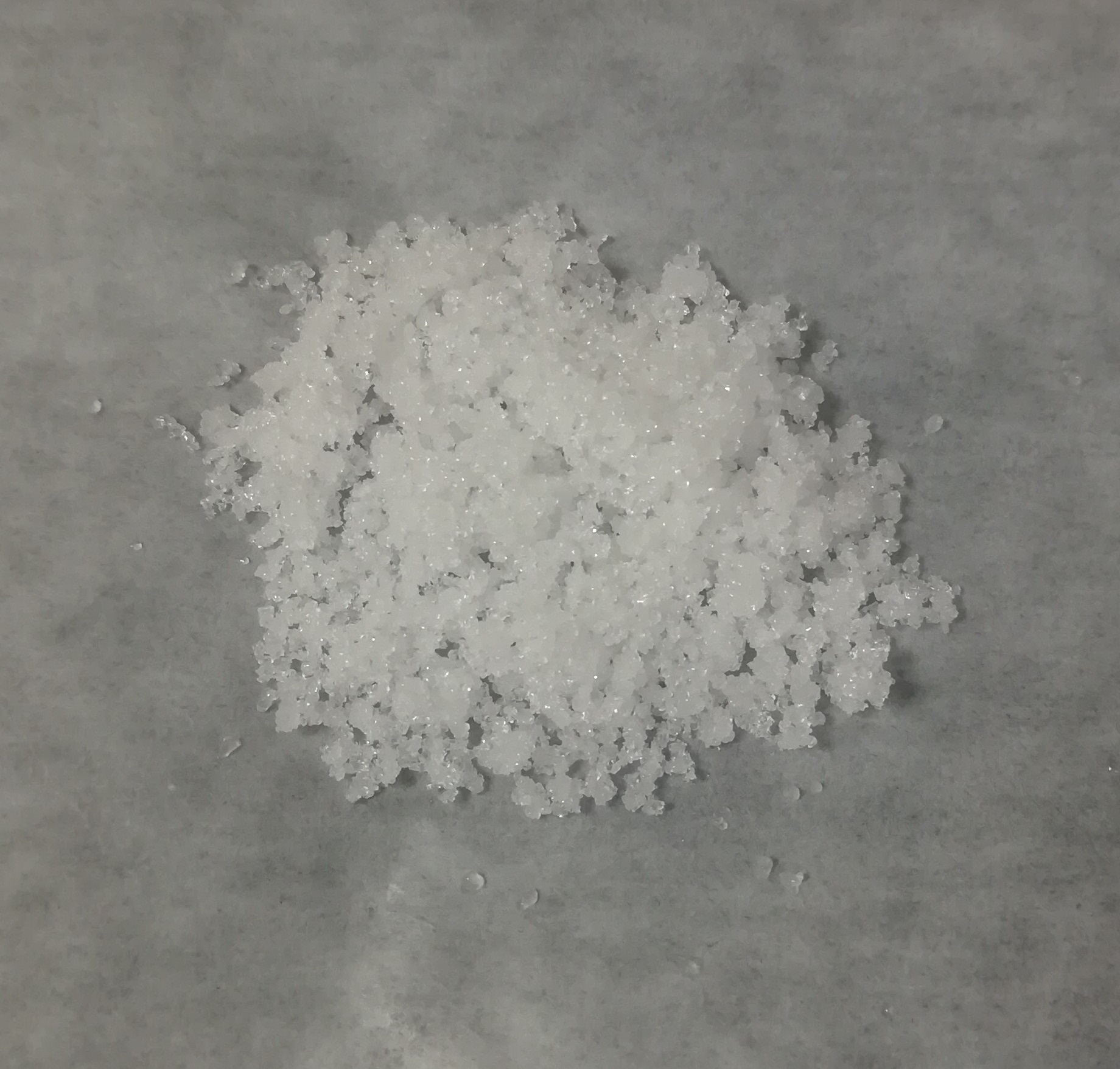
- Trihydrate

Names
- Other names: Plumbous perchlorate

Identifiers
CAS Number	13637-76-8
3D model (JSmol)	Interactive image
ChemSpider	55560
ECHA InfoCard	100.033.736
EC Number	237-125-7
PubChem CID	61655
UN number	1470
CompTox Dashboard (EPA)	DTXSID10890712
- InChI: InChI=1S/2ClHO4.Pb/c2*2-1(3,4)5;/h2*(H,2,3,4,5);/q;;+2/p-2
- SMILES: [O-]Cl(=O)(=O)=O.[O-]Cl(=O)(=O)=O.[Pb+2]

Properties
Chemical formula	Pb(ClO_{4})_{2}
Molar mass	406.10 g/mol
Appearance	White solid
Density	2.6 g/cm^{3}
Boiling point	250 °C (482 °F; 523 K) (decomposes)
Solubility in water	256.2 g/100 ml (25 °C)
Vapor pressure	0.36 Torr (trihydrate)

Hazards
- GHS labelling
Pictograms	(GHS03: Oxidizing) (GHS07: Exclamation mark) (GHS06: Toxic) (GHS09: Environmental hazard)
Hazard statements	H272, H302, H332, H360Df, H373, H410
Precautionary statements	P210, P260, P273, P301+P312, P304+P340, P308+P313

Related compounds
Other cations	Mercury(II) perchlorate; Tin(II) perchlorate; Cadmium perchlorate
- Except where otherwise noted, data are given for materials in their standard state (at 25 °C [77 °F], 100 kPa). Infobox references

Lead(II) perchlorate is a chemical compound with the formula Pb(ClO_{4})_{2}·xH_{2}O, where is x is 0,1, or 3. It is an extremely hygroscopic white solid that is very soluble in water.

== Preparation ==
Lead perchlorate trihydrate is produced by the reaction of lead(II) oxide, lead carbonate, or lead nitrate by perchloric acid:

Pb(NO_{3})_{2} + HClO_{4} → Pb(ClO_{4})_{2} + HNO_{3}

The excess perchloric acid was removed by first heating the solution to 125 °C, then heating it under moist air at 160 °C to remove the perchloric acid by converting the acid to the dihydrate. The anhydrous salt, Pb(ClO_{4})_{2}, is produced by heating the trihydrate to 120 °C under water-free conditions over phosphorus pentoxide. The trihydrate melts at 83 °C. The anhydrous salt decomposes into lead(II) chloride and a mixture of lead oxides at 250 °C. The monohydrate is produced by only partially dehydrating the trihydrate, and this salt undergoes hydrolysis at 103 °C.

The solution of anhydrous lead(II) perchlorate in methanol is explosive.

== Applications ==
Lead perchlorate has a high nucleon density, making it a viable detector for hypothetical proton decay.
