= Tetranitratoaluminate =

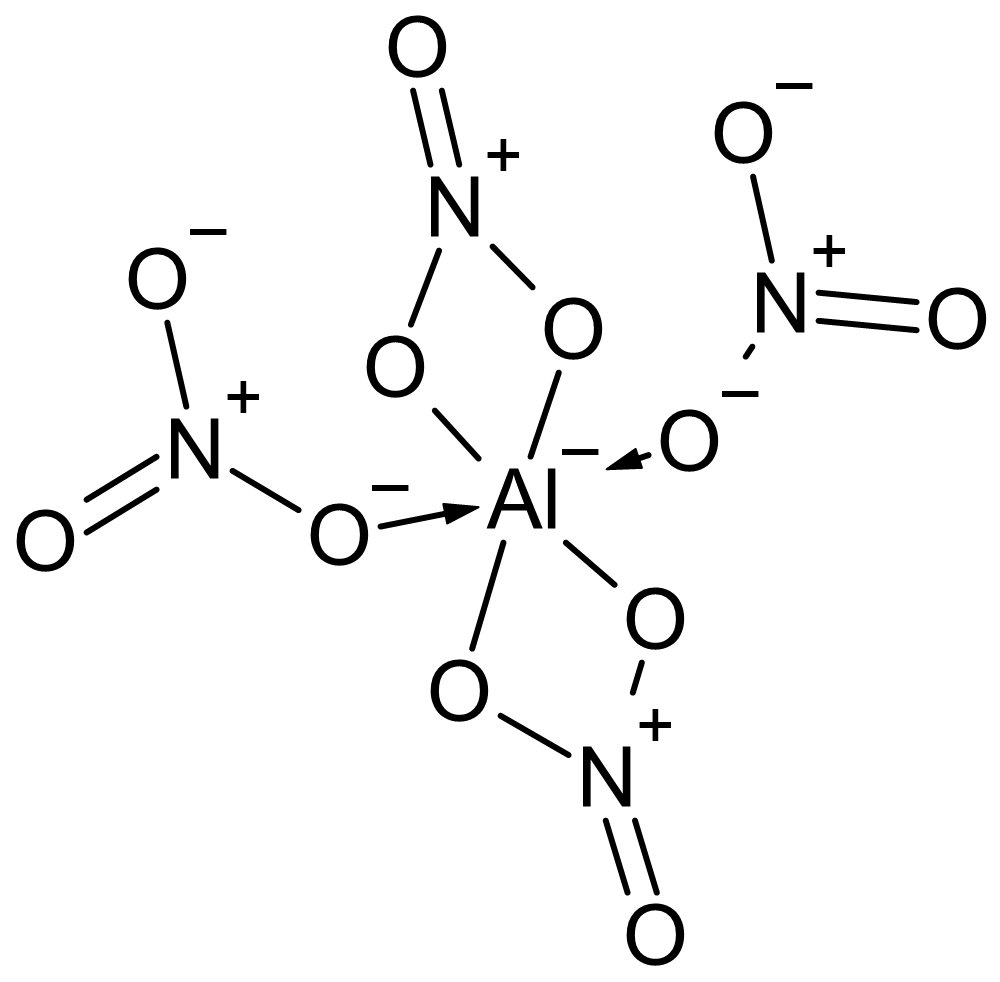

Identifiers
3D model (JSmol)	Interactive image
PubChem CID	22311544
CompTox Dashboard (EPA)	DTXSID501336081
- InChI: InChI=1S/Al.4NO3/c;4*2-1(3)4/q+3;4*-1 Key: ZORYQVFPUDXHRB-UHFFFAOYSA-N
- SMILES: O=[N+]1[O-][Al+3]2([O-]1)([O-][N+](=O)[O-])([O-][N+](=O)[O-])[O-][N+](=O)[O-]2

Properties
Chemical formula	AlN_{4}O_{12}^{−}
Molar mass	274.998 g·mol^{−1}

Related compounds
Other anions	tetraperchloratoaluminate
Other cations	tetranitratoborate
Related compounds	pentanitratoaluminate; hexanitratoaluminate
- Except where otherwise noted, data are given for materials in their standard state (at 25 °C [77 °F], 100 kPa). Infobox references

Tetranitratoaluminate is an anion of aluminium and nitrate groups with formula [Al(NO_{3})_{4}]^{−} that can form salts called tetranitratoaluminates. It is unusual in being a nitrate complex of a light element.

== Related substances ==
By substituting boron for aluminium tetranitratoborates result. Aluminium can coordinate more nitrates resulting in pentanitratoaluminates and hexanitratoaluminates.

By replacing nitrate with perchlorate, the tetraperchloratoaluminate ion results.

== Formation ==
When hydrated aluminium nitrate reacts with dinitrogen pentoxide it forms a nitronium salt: [NO_{2}]^{+}[Al(NO_{3})_{4}]^{−}.

A way to make a tetranitratoaluminate salt of a cation is to treat the chloride of the cation and aluminium chloride with liquid dinitrogen tetroxide pure or dissolved in nitromethane. The reaction is started at liquid nitrogen temperatures and then warmed up. Dark red nitrosyl chloride is formed as a byproduct. The byproducts and solvents can then be evaporated. The tetramethylammonium salt can form this way.

== Properties ==
The tetranitratoaluminate group has two bidentate nitrate groups attached in a square around the aluminium, and with two other monodentate nitrates attached via one oxygen only, perpendicular, up and down from the square.

Tetranitratoaluminate salts are not completely stable and can decompose to the nitrates and aluminium oxynitrates.

When nitronium tetranitratoaluminate is sublimed it can form anhydrous aluminium nitrate.

Nitronium tetranitratoaluminate dissolved in a nitric acid and dinitrogen pentoxide mixture yields the hexanitratoaluminate complex. In water is it converted to the hexaaqua complex with six water molecules replacing the nitrate groups.

== Examples ==
Tetraethyl ammonium tetranitratoaluminate along with nitronium tetranitratoaluminate were the first to be discovered.

1-Ethyl-4,5-dimethyl-tetrazolium tetranitratoaluminate is an oxygen balanced ionic liquid, This liquid salt is stable when moisture is excluded. It is soluble in methyl nitrate. It solidifies to a glass at −46 °C, starts to slowly decompose at 75 °C, and inflames, without oxygen required, around 200 °C. When it burns it produces aluminium oxide, nitrogen, water and carbon monoxide. It is being proposed as a rocket propellant, because it has better performance than hydrazine. Rubidium and caesium also form salts.

Tetramethyl ammonium tetranitratoaluminate forms monoclinic crystals with a = 12.195 Å, b = 9.639 Å, c = 12.908 Å, α = 90°, β = 110.41°, γ = 90°, and a formula weight of 349.17 (4 equivalents) per unit cell. The unit cell volume is 1422 Å^{3} and the calculated density 1.631 g/cm^{3}.
