= Tetraperchloratoaluminate =

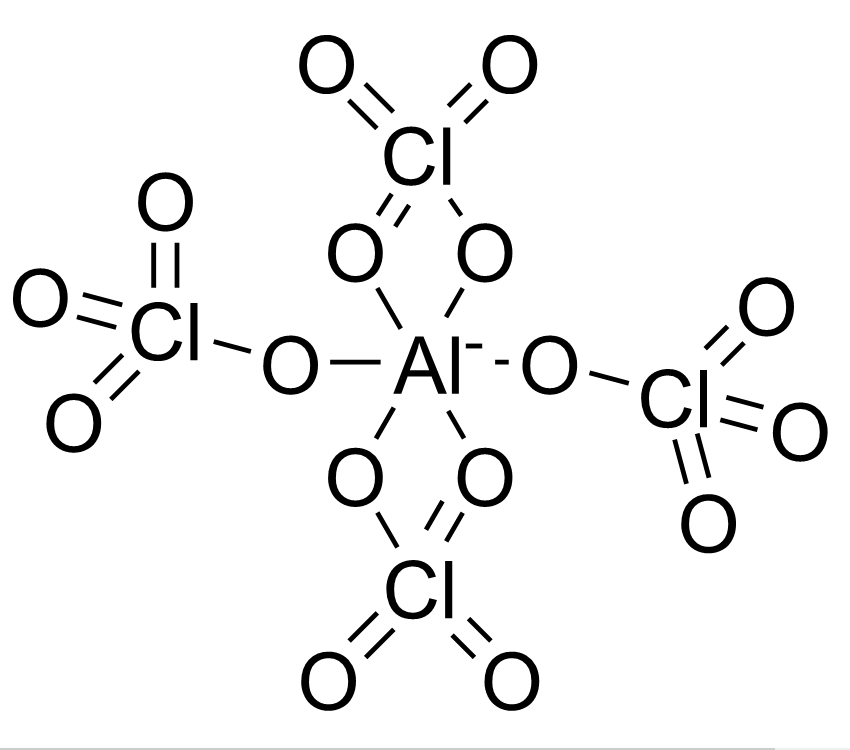

Names
- IUPAC name Tetraperchloratoaluminate

Identifiers
| 3D model (JSmol) | Interactive image |
- InChI: InChI=1S/Al.4ClHO4/c;4*2-1(3,4)5/h;4*(H,2,3,4,5)/q+3;;;;/p-4 Key: MRPKZWCUTZIENN-UHFFFAOYSA-J
- SMILES: O=Cl1(=O[Al-]2(OCl(=O)(=O)=O)(OCl(=O)(=O)=O)(OCl(=O2)(=O)=O)O1)=O

Properties
| Chemical formula | [Al(ClO_{4})_{4}]^{−} |
| Molar mass | 424.784 g mol−1 |

Related compounds
| Other anions | Tetranitratoaluminate |
| Other cations | Tetraperchloratoborate |
- Except where otherwise noted, data are given for materials in their standard state (at 25 °C [77 °F], 100 kPa). Infobox references

Tetraperchloratoaluminates are salts of the tetraperchloratoaluminate anion, [Al(ClO_{4})_{4}]^{−}. The anion contains aluminium tetrahedrally surrounded by four perchlorate groups. The perchlorate is covalently bonded to the aluminium, but perchlorate is much more well known as an ion. The covalent bond to aluminium distorts the perchlorate and renders it unstable.

Related chemicals are the haloperchloroatoaluminates, where there is one perchloro group attached to aluminium, and three halogens such as chlorine (chloroperchloroatoaluminates) or bromine (bromoperchloroatoaluminates).

== Formation ==
Nitronium tetraperchloratoaluminate is made from exact amounts of nitronium perchlorate and anhydrous aluminium chloride combined in liquid sulfur dioxide.

Ammonium tetraperchloratoaluminate can be formed by three moles of nitronium perchlorate, one mole of anhydrous aluminium chloride, and one mole of ammonium perchlorate combined in liquid sulfur dioxide.

== Properties ==
The tetraperchloratoaluminates are yellowish crystalline solids. They are stable up to 50 °C.

Above this temperature they decompose to hexaperchloratoaluminates which are more temperature stable.
