= ClO3 =

ClO3 may refer to:

- The chlorate anion, $\ce{ClO3-}$
- Monochlorine trioxide, a hypothetical radical akin to chlorine dioxide
- The empirical formula for dichlorine hexoxide / chloryl perchlorate
- The perchloryl cation, $\ce{ClO3+}$
