= Hexaperchloratoaluminate =

IUPAC Nomenclature of a polyatomic anion

Hexaperchloratoaluminate is a polyatomic anion with the chemical formula [Al(ClO_{4})_{6}]^{3−}. It is composed of six perchlorate groups (−ClO_{4} or more precisely −O−Cl(=O)_{3}) covalently bound to the central aluminium atom, resulting in the anion with net charge of –3. The six perchlorate groups are ligands of the central aluminium. This anion is a highly oxidizing and reactive complex, similar to other hexacoordinated aluminium complexes such as hexanitratoaluminate.

The aluminium perchlorate salts formed with hexaperchloratoaluminate are of particular interest due to their potential uses as energetic materials. The series of hexaperchloratoaluminate salts includes lithium hexaperchloratoaluminate, ammonium hexaperchloratoaluminate, tetramethylammonium hexaperchloratoaluminate, and trinitronium hexaperchloratoaluminate. Each of these compounds possess unique properties and may have potential applications in areas such as rocket propellants, pyrotechnics, and other explosive-based technologies.

== Preparation ==
Hexaperchloratoaluminates can be synthesized by combining aluminum trichloride and various perchlorates in liquid sulfur dioxide at a temperature of −10 °C (263 K):

3 [NO_{2}]ClO_{4} + 3 LiClO_{4} + AlCl_{3} → 3 NO_{2}Cl + Li_{3}[Al(ClO_{4})_{6}],

3 [NO_{2}]ClO_{4} + 3 [NH_{4}]ClO_{4} + AlCl_{3} → 3 NO_{2}Cl + [NH_{4}]_{3}[Al(ClO_{4})_{6}],

6 [NO_{2}]ClO_{4} + AlCl_{3} → 3 NO_{2}Cl + [NO_{2}]_{3}[Al(ClO_{4})_{6}].

To form hexaperchloratoaluminates, one can heat aluminium nitrate in the presence of nitrosonium or nitronium perchlorate at a temperature of 125 °C (398 K):

10–14 [NO]ClO_{4} + Al(NO_{3})_{3} → [NO_{2}]_{3}[Al(ClO_{4})_{6}] + gaseous products,

6–10 [NO_{2}]ClO_{4} + Al(NO_{3})_{3} → [NO_{2}]_{3}[Al(ClO_{4})_{6}] + gaseous products,

3 [NO_{2}]ClO_{4} + 3 KClO_{4} + AlCl_{3} → 3 NO_{2}Cl + K_{3}[Al(ClO_{4})_{6}].

Obtaining hydrazinium hexaperchloratoaluminate in a highly pure form is problematic. According to the available studies, this compound can only be produced via a low-yielding synthesis route including the reaction of aluminium chloride, hydrazinium perchlorate, and nitronium perchlorate:

3 [NO_{2}]ClO_{4} + 3 [N_{2}H_{5}]ClO_{4} + AlCl_{3} → 3 NO_{2}Cl + [N_{2}H_{5}]_{3}[Al(ClO_{4})_{6}].

Guanidinium hexaperchloratoaluminate can be synthesized via the following reaction:

3 [NO_{2}]ClO_{4} + 3 [C(NH_{2})_{3}]ClO_{4} + AlCl_{3} → 3 NO_{2}Cl + [C(NH_{2})_{3}]_{3}[Al(ClO_{4})_{6}].
