= Chloryl tetraperchloratoaurate =

Identifiers
CAS Number	453509-25-6
3D model (JSmol)	Interactive image
- InChI: InChI=1S/Au.4ClHO4.ClO2/c;4*2-1(3,4)5;2-1-3/h;4*(H,2,3,4,5);/q+3;;;;;+1/p-4 Key: ACLJBRMVWTXQHV-UHFFFAOYSA-J
- SMILES: O=Cl[O+].O=Cl(=O)(=O)[O-][Au+3]([O-]Cl(=O)(=O)=O)([O-]Cl(=O)(=O)=O)[O-]Cl(=O)(=O)=O

Properties
Chemical formula	[ClO_{2}][Au(ClO_{4})_{4}]
Molar mass	662.22 g/mol
Appearance	Orange crystals
Density	3.18 g/cm^{3}
Melting point	48 °C (118 °F; 321 K) (decomposes)
Solubility in water	Reacts

Structure
Crystal structure	monoclinic
- Except where otherwise noted, data are given for materials in their standard state (at 25 °C [77 °F], 100 kPa). Infobox references

Chloryl tetraperchloratoaurate is an inorganic chemical compound with the formula [ClO_{2}]^{+}[Au(ClO_{4})_{4}]^{−} consisting of the chloryl cation and a tetraperchloratoaurate(III) anion. It is an orange solid that readily hydrolyzes in air.

== Production and reactions ==
Chloryl tetraperchloratoaurate is produced by the oxidation of gold metal, gold(III) chloride, or chloroauric acid by dichlorine hexoxide:

2 AuCl_{3} + 8 Cl_{2}O_{6} → 2 [ClO_{2}][Au(ClO_{4})_{4}] + 6 ClO_{2} + 3 Cl_{2}

A production of gold(III) perchlorate is attempted by heating this compound, but it instead forms an oxy-perchlorato derivative.
