= Perchloratoborate =

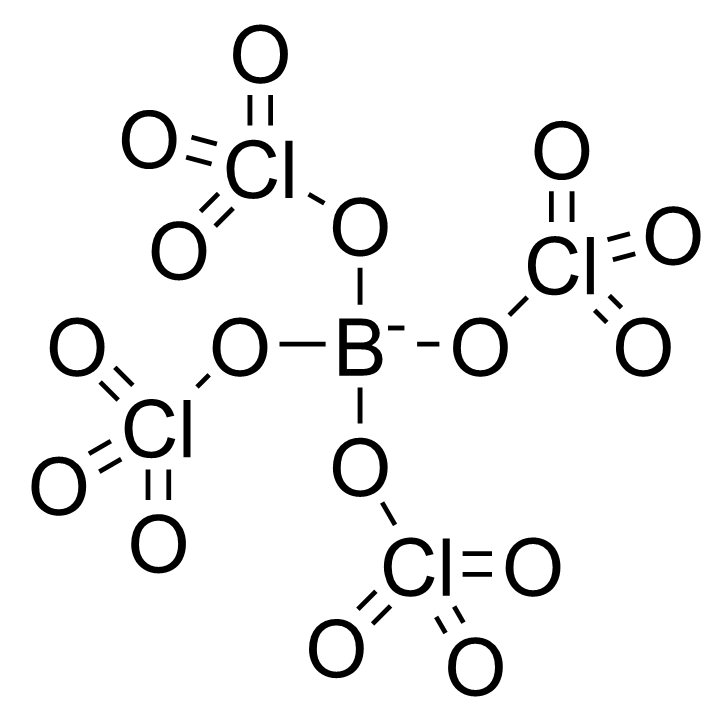

Names
- IUPAC name Perchloratoborate

Identifiers
3D model (JSmol)	Interactive image
- InChI: InChI=1S/BCl4O16/c6-2(7,8)18-1(19-3(9,10)11,20-4(12,13)14)21-5(15,16)17/q-1 Key: KAVUEELAKBBJMP-UHFFFAOYSA-N
- SMILES: O=[Cl](=O)(=O)O[B-](O[Cl](=O)(=O)=O)(O[Cl](=O)(=O)=O)O[Cl](=O)(=O)=O

Properties
Chemical formula	[B(ClO_{4})_{4}]-
Molar mass	408.61 g·mol−1

Related compounds
Other anions	Tetranitratoborate
Other cations	Tetraperchloratoaluminate
- Except where otherwise noted, data are given for materials in their standard state (at 25 °C [77 °F], 100 kPa). Infobox references

Perchloratoborate is an anion of the form [B(ClO_{4})_{4}]^{−}. It can form partly stable solid salts with heavy alkali metals. They are more stable than nitratoborate salts. K[B(ClO_{4})_{4}] decomposes at 35 °C, Rb[B(ClO_{4})_{4}] is stable to 50 °C, and Cs[B(ClO_{4})_{4}] can exist up to 80 °C.

Perchloratoborates are analogous to perchloratoaluminates ([Al(ClO_{4})_{4}]^{−}).

Another related anion is the chloroperchloratoborate, Cl_{3}B(ClO_{4}).

Boron perchlorate itself is unstable above −5 °C.

== Decomposition ==
On thermal decomposition the alkali perchloratoborate salts form an alkali perchlorate, and boron trioxide as a solid residue, and gas containing dichlorine heptoxide, chlorine dioxide, chlorine, and oxygen.

2 M[B(ClO_{4})_{4}] → 2 MClO_{4} + B_{2}O_{3} + (3 Cl_{2}O_{7} or 6 ClO_{2} + 4 1/2 O_{2} or 6 Cl_{2} + 10 1/2 O_{2})

When the alkali perchloratoborates first start to decompose at the lower temperatures, the reaction is endothermic, and dichlorine heptoxide is formed. However, if caesium perchloratoborate is heated the decomposition becomes exothermic above 90 °C, and at 100 °C it explodes exothermically forming chlorine and oxygen.

== Reactions ==
When rubidium perchloratoborate is reacted with extra perchloric acid, it forms RbBO(ClO_{4})_{2}.

In water, alkali perchloratoborates decompose exothermically to form boric acid, perchloric acid, and the perchlorate.

== Formation ==
Nitronium perchloratoborate (NO_{2}B(ClO_{4})_{4})can be formed by reacting nitronium perchlorate with boron trichloride in solution. Similarly ammonium perchlorate reacts with BCl_{3} forming ammonium perchloratoborate.

The metal perchloratoborates can also be formed from the metal perchlorate dissolved in anhydrous perchloric acid reacting with boron trichloride. Another way is to react a metal chloridoborate (MBCl_{4}) with perchloric acid. Chloridoborates can be made from the metal chloride and boron trichloride dissolved in nitrosyl chloride. Extra Cl_{2}O_{7} drives the reaction forward.

BCl_{3} + 3HClO_{4} → B(ClO_{4})_{3}

Also formed is BCl_{2}ClO_{4} and BCl(ClO_{4})_{2} which disproportionates above −78 °C to the boron perchlorate and dichloroboron perchlorate.

B(ClO_{4})_{3} + ClO^{−}_{4} → B(ClO_{4})^{−}_{4}

== Properties ==
Caesium perchloratoborate is hygroscopic. It has a density of 2.5 g/cm^{3}. It has no colour.

Infrared absorption bands are observed in caesium perchloratoborate at 640 and 1,087 cm^{−1}.

Potassium perchloratoborate has density 2.18 g/cm^{3}, and rubidium perchloratoborate has density 2.32 g/cm^{3}.

The three alkali perchloratoborates fume in moist air, are all crystalline and colourless.
