= Mercury(II) perchlorate =

Names
- Other names: Mercuric perchlorate; Mercury diperchlorate

Identifiers
CAS Number	7616-83-3
3D model (JSmol)	Interactive image
ECHA InfoCard	100.028.659
EC Number	231-525-5
PubChem CID	3080641
CompTox Dashboard (EPA)	DTXSID90890634
- InChI: InChI=1S/2ClHO4.Hg/c2*2-1(3,4)5;/h2*(H,2,3,4,5);/q;;+2/p-2
- SMILES: [O-]Cl(=O)(=O)=O.[O-]Cl(=O)(=O)=O.[Hg+2]

Properties
Chemical formula	Hg(ClO_{4})_{2}
Molar mass	399.49 g/mol (anhydrous)
Appearance	White solid
Density	2.84 g/cm^{3} (hexahydrate)
Melting point	170 °C (338 °F; 443 K) (anhydrous)
Boiling point	250 °C (482 °F; 523 K) (decomposition, anhydrous)
Solubility in water	Soluble

Structure
Crystal structure	Trigonal (hexahydrate)
Space group	P3̅m1 (hexahydrate)
Lattice constant	a = 8.01 Å, b = 8.01 Å, c = 5.34 Å α = 90°, β = 90°, γ = 120° (hexahydrate)

Hazards
- GHS labelling
Pictograms	(GHS03: Oxidizing) (GHS06: Toxic) (GHS08: Health hazard) (GHS09: Environmental hazard)
NFPA 704 (fire diamond)	4 0 0 OX
Threshold limit value (TLV)	0.05 mg/m^{3} (TWA), 0.1 mg/m^{3} (C)
- NIOSH (US health exposure limits)
IDLH (Immediate danger)	10 mg/m^{3}

Related compounds
Other cations	Cadmium perchlorate
- Except where otherwise noted, data are given for materials in their standard state (at 25 °C [77 °F], 100 kPa). Infobox references

Mercury(II) perchlorate is an inorganic chemical compound with the formula Hg(ClO_{4})_{2}·nH_{2}O, where n can range from 0 to 6. The anhydrous and hydrates are all toxic, water-soluble, and hygroscopic white solids.

== Preparation and reactions ==
Hydrates of mercury(II) perchlorate are most commonly prepared by the reaction of mercury(II) oxide and concentrated perchloric acid:

HgO + 2 HClO_{4} → Hg(ClO_{4})_{2} + H_{2}O

Evaporation of the resulting solution results in the formation of the hexahydrate, Hg(ClO_{4})_{2}·6H_{2}O, which can be converted to lower hydrates, such as the dihydrate, by heating to 30 °C in a vacuum. Further heating does not produce the anhydrous form, but instead forms a basic mercury perchlorate.

The anhydrous form is produced by dehydrating the dihydrate with anhydrous perchloric acid or dichlorine hexoxide.

Solutions of mercury(II) perchlorate in water reacts with aqueous ammonia to produce tetraamminemercury(II) perchlorate, [Hg(NH_{3})_{4}](ClO_{4})_{2}. Heating of the tetraammine complex results in the diammine complex.

Mercury(II) perchlorate also reacts with elemental mercury to form mercury(I) perchlorate:

Hg(ClO_{4})_{2} + Hg → Hg_{2}(ClO_{4})_{2}

== Structure ==
The solid hexahydrate, Hg(ClO_{4})_{2}·6H_{2}O, has a trigonal crystal structure and consists of octahedral [Hg(H_{2}O)_{6}]^{2+} centers and ClO_{4}^{–} ions.

The anhydrous form was probed by IR spectroscopy and was found to consist of monodendate perchlorate ions.

== Applications ==
Mercury(II) perchlorate finds limited applications in organic synthesis, such as in the hydrolysis of vinyl halides and the allylation of isatins and isatin ketoimines.
