= Mercury(I) perchlorate =

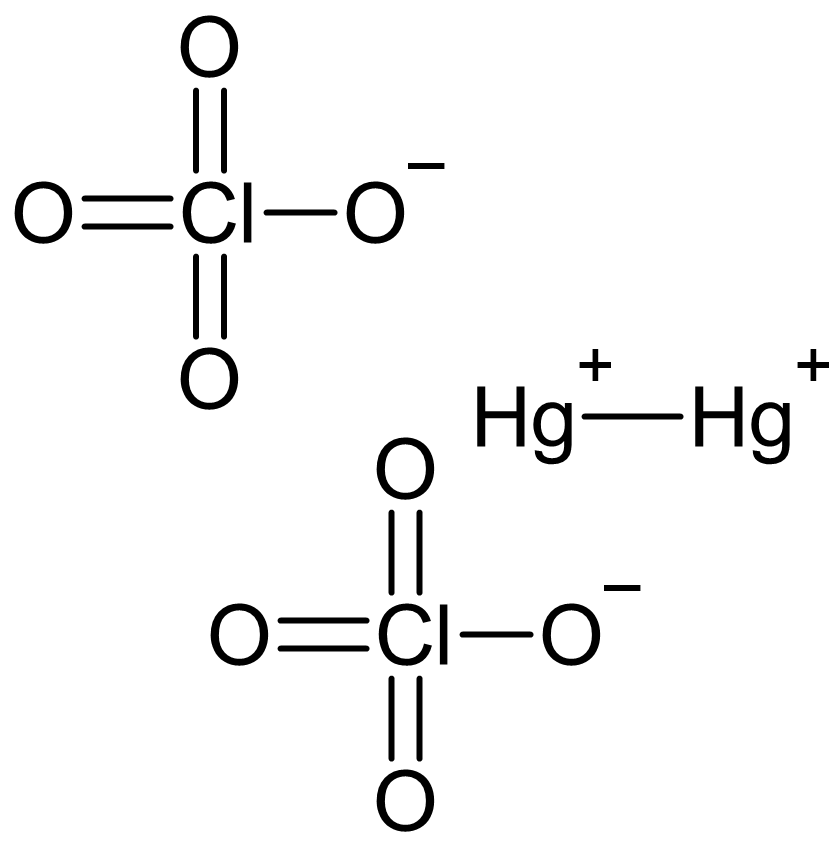

Names
- IUPAC name Dimercury(I) diperchlorate
- Other names Mercurous perchlorate

Identifiers
CAS Number	13932-02-0
3D model (JSmol)	Interactive image
ChemSpider	62981223
PubChem CID	166946
- InChI: InChI=1S/2ClHO4.2Hg/c2*2-1(3,4)5;;/h2*(H,2,3,4,5);;/q;;2*+1/p-2 Key: BKLOZLQOQNJIFY-UHFFFAOYSA-L
- SMILES: [Hg+][Hg+].[O-]Cl(=O)(=O)=O.[O-]Cl(=O)(=O)=O

Properties
Chemical formula	Hg_{2}(ClO_{4})_{2}
Molar mass	600.08 g/mol
Appearance	Crystalline
Solubility in water	Very soluble in water
- Except where otherwise noted, data are given for materials in their standard state (at 25 °C [77 °F], 100 kPa). Infobox references

Mercury(I) perchlorate is an inorganic compound of mercury and perchloric acid with the formula Hg_{2}(ClO_{4})_{2}. Like other mercury(I) compounds, it contains the dimeric Hg_{2}^{2+} cation, in which the two mercury atoms are joined by an Hg–Hg bond. It is highly soluble in water and forms several hydrates, including a tetrahydrate and dihydrate.

== Preparation ==
Mercury(I) perchlorate can be prepared by dissolving mercury(I) carbonate in perchloric acid:

Hg_{2}CO_{3} + 2 HClO_{4} → Hg_{2}(ClO_{4})_{2} + H_{2}O + CO_{2}

It can also be prepared by comproportionation of elemental mercury with mercury(II) perchlorate in aqueous solution:

Hg + Hg(ClO_{4})_{2} → Hg_{2}(ClO_{4})_{2}

In perchloric acid solution, the equilibrium between mercury, Hg^{2+} and Hg_{2}^{2+} is shifted toward formation of mercury(I). The standard electrode potential of the Hg_{2}^{2+}/Hg couple in perchloric acid solution is approximately 0.796 V relative to the standard hydrogen electrode.

== Properties ==
=== Hydrates ===
Mercury(I) perchlorate forms crystalline tetrahydrate, Hg_{2}(ClO_{4})_{2}·4H_{2}O, and dihydrate, Hg_{2}(ClO_{4})_{2}·2H_{2}O. The tetrahydrate is readily converted to the dihydrate on heating above approximately 36 °C. The tetrahydrate is very soluble in water, and the dihydrate is the stable solid phase in equilibrium with concentrated aqueous solutions at higher temperatures.

Crystallographic compilations assign mercury(I) perchlorate tetrahydrate to the orthorhombic crystal system, space group Imma (No. 74).

=== Formation of mixed-valence compounds ===
Partial dehydration of mercury(I) perchlorate dihydrate can produce the mixed-valence mercury(I,II) compound (Hg_{2})Hg(OH)_{2}(ClO_{4})_{2} as colorless crystals.

The compound crystallizes in the monoclinic crystal system, space group C2/c, with lattice parameters a = 18.477(5) Å, b = 4.908(1) Å, c = 10.862(3) Å, β = 93.80(2)° and Z = 4. Its structure contains infinite zigzag chains composed of both Hg_{2}^{2+} units and Hg^{2+} centers linked by hydroxide groups, with perchlorate ions separating the chains.

== Coordination chemistry ==
Mercury(I) perchlorate has frequently been used as a source of the Hg_{2}^{2+} ion in coordination chemistry. Its complexes retain the characteristic mercury–mercury bond, although the coordination environment around each mercury atom varies considerably with the ligand.

With pyridine N-oxide, mercury(I) perchlorate forms the dimeric complex [Hg(C_{5}H_{5}NO)_{2}(ClO_{4})]_{2}. Single-crystal X-ray diffraction gives an Hg–Hg distance of 2.523 ± 0.002 Å (252.3 ± 0.2 pm). Three of the four pyridine N-oxide ligands bridge between neighboring mercury dimers, producing mercury coordination numbers of four or five rather than the more usual nearly linear two-coordinate environment of Hg(I).

Acridine forms bis(acridine)dimercury(I) perchlorate, [Hg_{2}(C_{13}H_{9}N)_{2}](ClO_{4})_{2}. The complex crystallizes in the monoclinic space group I2/m. The acridine molecules occupy approximately axial coordination sites on the Hg_{2}^{2+} unit through their nitrogen atoms, with Hg–N distances of 2.150 ± 0.005 Å (215.0 ± 0.5 pm); longer contacts also occur between mercury and perchlorate oxygen atoms.

Other donor ligands likewise form stable complexes of the intact Hg_{2}^{2+} ion. For example, a caffeine complex, [Hg_{2}(Caf)_{2}](ClO_{4})_{2}·2H_{2}O, contains an approximately linear Caf-Hg-Hg-Caf unit with an Hg–Hg distance of 2.5088 ± 0.0006 Å (250.88 ± 0.06 pm).
