= Tetranitratoborate =

Anion composed of boron with 4 nitrate groups

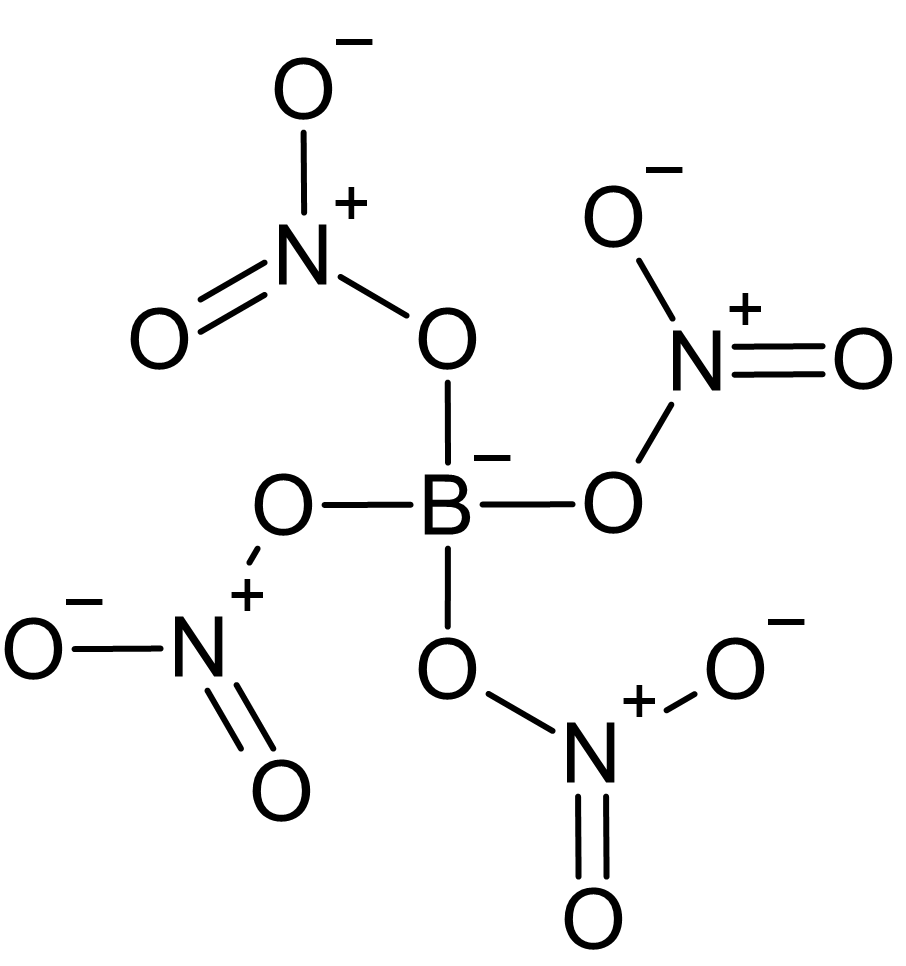

Names
- IUPAC name Tetranitratoborate

Identifiers
3D model (JSmol)	Interactive image
- InChI: InChI=1S/BN4O12/c6-2(7)14-1(15-3(8)9,16-4(10)11)17-5(12)13/q-1 Key: DWOWQYMUXLKXAA-UHFFFAOYSA-N
- SMILES: [O-][N+](=O)O[B-](O[N+](=O)[O-])(O[N+](=O)[O-])O[N+](=O)[O-]

Properties
Chemical formula	[B(NO_{3})_{4}]−
Molar mass	258.83 g·mol−1

Related compounds
Other anions	Tetraperchloratoborate
Other cations	Tetranitratoaluminate
- Except where otherwise noted, data are given for materials in their standard state (at 25 °C [77 °F], 100 kPa). Infobox references

Tetranitratoborate is an anion composed of boron with four nitrate groups. It has formula [B(NO_{3})_{4}]^{−}. It can form salts with large cations such as tetramethylammonium nitratoborate, or tetraethylammonium tetranitratoborate. The ion was first discovered by C. R. Guibert and M. D. Marshall in 1966 after failed attempts to make neutral (non-ionic) boron nitrate, B(NO_{3})_{3}, which has resisted attempts to make it; if it exists, it is unstable above −78 °C.

Other related ions are the slightly more stable tetraperchloratoborates, with perchlorate groups instead of nitrate, and tetranitratoaluminate with the next atom down the periodic table, aluminium instead of boron ([Al(NO_{3})_{4}]^{−}).

== Formation ==
Tetramethylammonium chloride reacts with BCl_{3} to make [N(CH_{3})_{4}]^{+}[BCl_{4}]^{−}. Then the tetrachloroborate is reacted with N_{2}O_{4} at around −20 °C to form tetramethylammonium nitratoborate, and other gases such as NO_{2}Cl and Cl_{2}.

Another mechanism to make tetranitratoborate salts is to shake a metal nitrate with BCl_{3} in chloroform at 20 °C for several days. Trichloronitratoborate [BCl_{3}(NO_{3})]^{−} is an unstable intermediate.

M^{+}NO^{−}_{3} + BCl_{3} → M^{+}[BCl_{3}(NO_{3})]^{−}

4 M^{+}[BCl_{3}(NO_{3})]^{−} → 3 M^{+}[BCl_{4}]^{−} + M^{+}[B(NO_{3})_{4}]^{−}

== Properties ==
The infrared spectrum of tetramethylammonium nitratoborate includes a prominent line at 1,612 cm^{−1} with shoulders at 1582 and 1,626 cm^{−1} attributed to v_{4}. Also prominent is 1,297 and 1,311 cm^{−1} attributed to v_{1}, with these vibrations due to the nitrate bonded via one oxygen.

The density of tetramethylammonium nitratoborate is 1.555 g·cm^{−3}. It is colourless and crystalline. As tetramethylammonium nitratoborate is heated it has some sort of transition between 51 and 62 °C. It decomposes above 75 °C producing gas. Above 112 °C it is exothermic, and a solid is left if it is heated to 160 °C.

Tetramethylammonium nitratoborate is insoluble in cold water but slightly soluble in hot water. It does not react with water. It also dissolves in liquid ammonia, acetonitrile, methanol, and dimethylformamide. It reacts with liquid sulfur dioxide.

At room temperature tetramethylammonium nitratoborate is stable for months. It does not explode with impact.

Alkali metal tetranitratoborates are unstable at room temperature and decompose.

1-Ethyl-3-methyl-imidazolimium tetranitratoborate was discovered in 2002. It is an ionic liquid that turns solid at −25 °C.
