= Pentanitratoaluminate =

Anion of aluminium and nitrate

Pentanitratoaluminate is an anion of aluminium and nitrate groups with formula [Al(NO_{3})_{5}]^{2−} that can form salts called pentanitratoaluminates. It is unusual being a complex with five nitrate groups, and being a nitrate complex of a light element with nitrate. Such a complex with five nitrate groups is called a pentanitratometallate.

== Related complexes ==
There is a pentanitrato complex with cerium (PPh_{3}Et)_{2}[Ce(NO_{3})_{5}]. Tetranitratoaluminate and hexanitratoaluminate are related anions with aluminium at their core.

== Properties ==
There are two different arrangements for the coordination of nitrate with aluminium in the complex. One nitrate is bonded with two oxygens to the aluminium (bidentate), and the other five oxygen atoms only link via one oxygen (monodentate). The bidentate nitrate has an O–Al length of 1.98 Å. Another two Al–O bonds roughly in the same plane have a length of 1.89 Å. The other two Al–O bonds complete a distorted octahedral arrangement and pop out the top and bottom of the aluminium with a length of 1.93 Å. The bidentate connected nitrate group is distorted so that the uncoordinated terminal oxygen bond is shorter than the coordinated oxygen–nitrogen distance (1.22 versus 1.31 Å). The angles are also warped, with coordinated oxygen angle subtended on the nitrogen of 109°, and angle of these oxygen atoms with the terminal atom of 126°. The whole nitrate is still planar along with the aluminium.

== Examples ==
An example salt is caesium pentanitratoaluminate Cs_{2}[Al(NO_{3})_{5}]. caesium pentanitratoaluminate crystallises in the trigonal form with α = 11.16 Å, c = 10.02 Å, formula mass 602.85, with three molecules per unit cell. The unit cell volume is 1080 Å^{3}, measured density 2.69 g/cm^{3}. The space group is P3_{1}21. It is a crystalline substance.

Caesium pentanitratoaluminate has been formed by treating a mixture of caesium chloride and caesium tetrachloroaluminate with dinitrogen tetroxide and methyl nitrate, and pumping off the NOCl gas produced. If only caesium tetracloroaluminate is used, omitting the CsCl, then the result contains solid Al(NO_{3})_{3}·CH_{3}CN as well.

Tetramethylammonium pentanitratoaluminate has been made by recrystallising tetramethyl ammonium tetranitratoaluminate in acetonitrile over several weeks. It forms a waxy substance.
