= Aluminium arsenate =

Names
- Other names Aluminium arsenate

Identifiers
CAS Number	13462-91-4; (Octahydrate): 60763-04-4
3D model (JSmol)	Interactive image; (Octahydrate): Interactive image
ChemSpider	10636688; (Octahydrate): 21391673
PubChem CID	57351442; (Octahydrate): 24884165
CompTox Dashboard (EPA)	DTXSID601031713; (Octahydrate): DTXSID70647789
- InChI: InChI=1S/Al.AsH3O4/c;2-1(3,4)5/h;(H3,2,3,4,5)/q+3;/p-3 Key: RCJAOTMBSRLOJZ-UHFFFAOYSA-K; (Octahydrate): InChI=1S/Al.AsH3O4.8H2O/c;2-1(3,4)5;;;;;;;;/h;(H3,2,3,4,5);8*1H2/q+3;;;;;;;;;/p-3 Key: CHNKHEXWDMIYLG-UHFFFAOYSA-K
- SMILES: [O-][As](=O)([O-])[O-].[Al+3]; (Octahydrate): O.O.O.O.O.O.O.O.O=[As]([O-])([O-])[O-].[Al+3]

Properties
Chemical formula	AlAsO_{4}
Molar mass	165.899 g·mol^{−1}
Appearance	colourless crystals
Density	3.25 g/cm^{3}
Melting point	1,000 °C (1,830 °F; 1,270 K)
Solubility in water	insoluble
Solubility product (K_{sp})	10^{−18.06} for 2 AlAsO_{4.7} H_{2}O.
Refractive index (n_{D})	1.596

Structure
Crystal structure	hexagonal

Thermochemistry
Std molar entropy (S^{⦵}_{298})	145.6 J/mol K
Std enthalpy of formation (Δ_{f}H^{⦵}_{298})	−1431.1 kJ/mol
- Except where otherwise noted, data are given for materials in their standard state (at 25 °C [77 °F], 100 kPa). Infobox references

Aluminium arsenate is an inorganic compound with the formula AlAsO_{4}. It is most commonly found as an octahydrate. It is a colourless solid that is produced by the reaction between sodium arsenate and a soluble aluminium salt. Aluminium arsenate occurs naturally as the mineral mansfieldite. Anhydrous form is known as an extremely rare, fumarolic mineral alarsite A synthetic hydrate of aluminium arsenate is produced by hydrothermal method. with the formulation Al_{2}O_{3}·3As_{2}O_{5}·10H_{2}O.

Modification of aluminium orthoarsenate was carried out by heating different samples to different temperatures. Both amorphous and crystalline forms were obtained. The solubility product was determined to be 10^{−18.06} for aluminium arsenate hydrate of formula AlAsO_{4}·3.5H_{2}O. Like gallium arsenate and boron arsenate, it adopts the α-quartz-type structure. The high pressure form has a rutile-type structure in which aluminium and arsenic are six-coordinate.
