= Hexanitratoaluminate =

Hexanitratoaluminate is an anion of aluminium and six nitrate groups with formula [Al(NO_{3})_{6}]^{3−} that can form salts called hexanitratoaluminates.

== Related compounds ==
Hexaperchloratoaluminate [Al(ClO_{4})_{6}]^{3−} has perchlorate groups instead of nitrate, and is similarly sensitive to water. Pentanitratoaluminates have five nitrate groups. Tetranitratoaluminates have only four nitrate groups.

== Examples ==
A known salt is potassium hexanitratoaluminate K_{3}[Al(NO_{3})_{6}].

Tetramethylammonium hexanitratoaluminate can be formed from tetramethylammonium chloride, aluminium chloride and dinitrogen tetroxide diluted with nitromethane.

Rubidium hexanitratoaluminate also exists.
