= Chloryl =

Ion

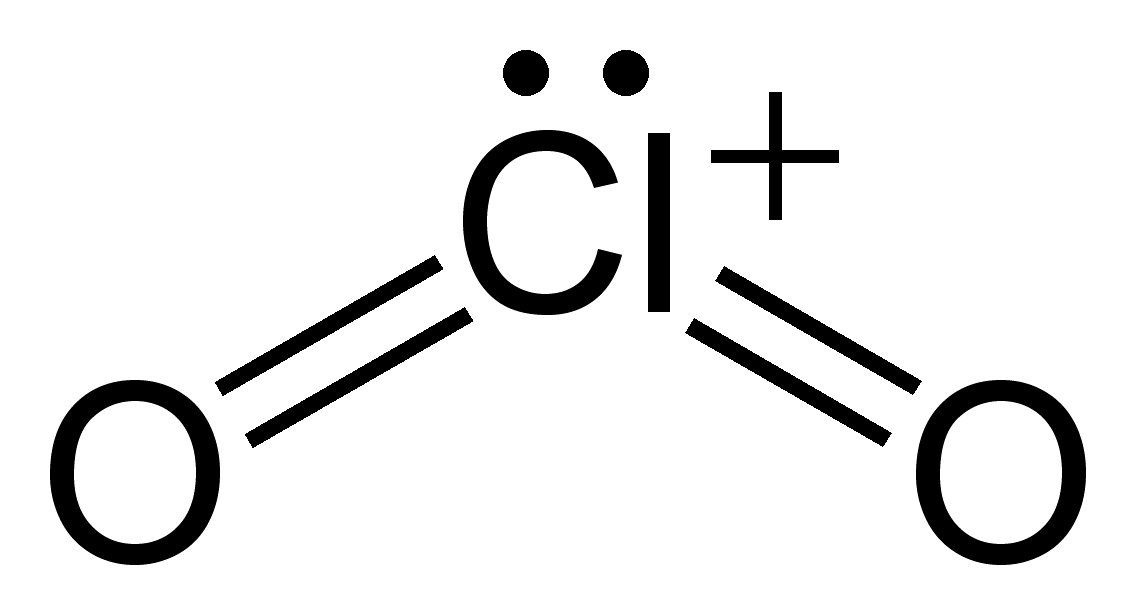

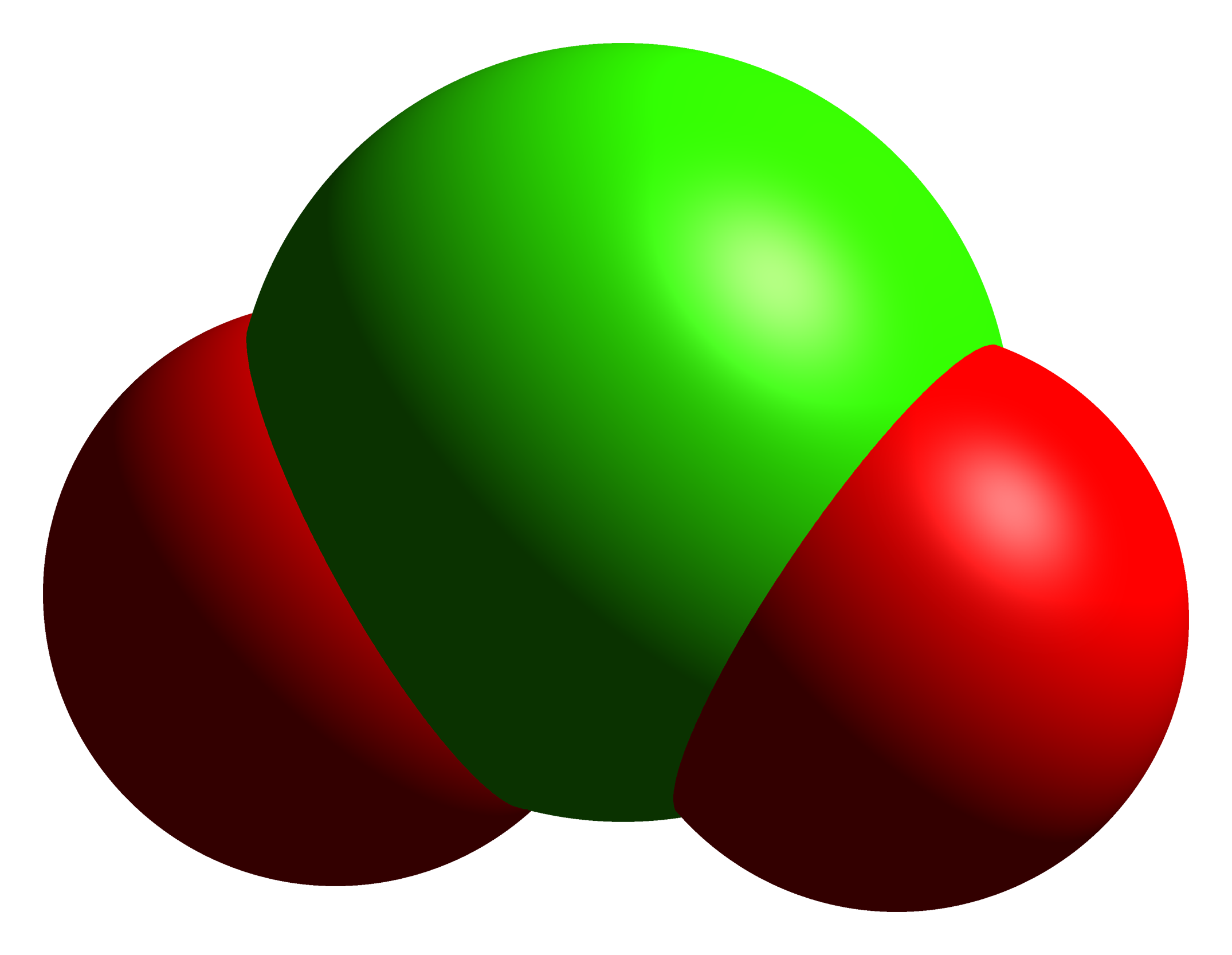

Names
- IUPAC name Dioxo-λ^{3}-chloranium
- Other names: Chlorylium; Dioxochloronium(V)

Identifiers
CAS Number	25052-55-5
3D model (JSmol)	Interactive image
ChEBI	CHEBI:29418
ChemSpider	19127824
Gmelin Reference	100601
CompTox Dashboard (EPA)	DTXSID20874008
- InChI: InChI=1S/ClO2/c2-1-3/q+1 Key: UVQYMEMTCMFUIN-UHFFFAOYSA-N
- SMILES: O=[Cl+]=O
- Except where otherwise noted, data are given for materials in their standard state (at 25 °C [77 °F], 100 kPa). Infobox references

In chemistry, chloryl refers to a triatomic cation with chemical formula ClO^{+}_{2}. This species has the same general structure as chlorite (ClO^{−}_{2}) but it is electronically different, with chlorine having a +5 oxidation state (rather than the +3 of chlorite). This makes it a rare example of a positively charged oxychloride. Chloryl compounds, such as FClO_{2} and [ClO_{2}][RuF_{6}], are all highly reactive and react violently with water and most organic compounds.

== Structure ==
The ClO^{+}_{2} cation is isoelectronic with SO_{2}, and has a bent structure with a bond angle close to 120°. The Cl–O bond is of bond order 1.5, with its Lewis structure consisting of a double bond and a dative bond which does not utilize d-orbitals.

The red color of ClO^{+}_{2} is caused by electron transitions into an antibonding orbital. The analogous transition in SO_{2} is not in the visible spectrum, so SO_{2} is colorless. The strength of interaction with the counterion affects the energy of this antibonding orbital; thus, in colorless chloryl compounds, strong interactions with the counterion, corresponding with the higher covalent character of the bonding, shift the transition energy out of the visible spectrum.

== Compounds ==
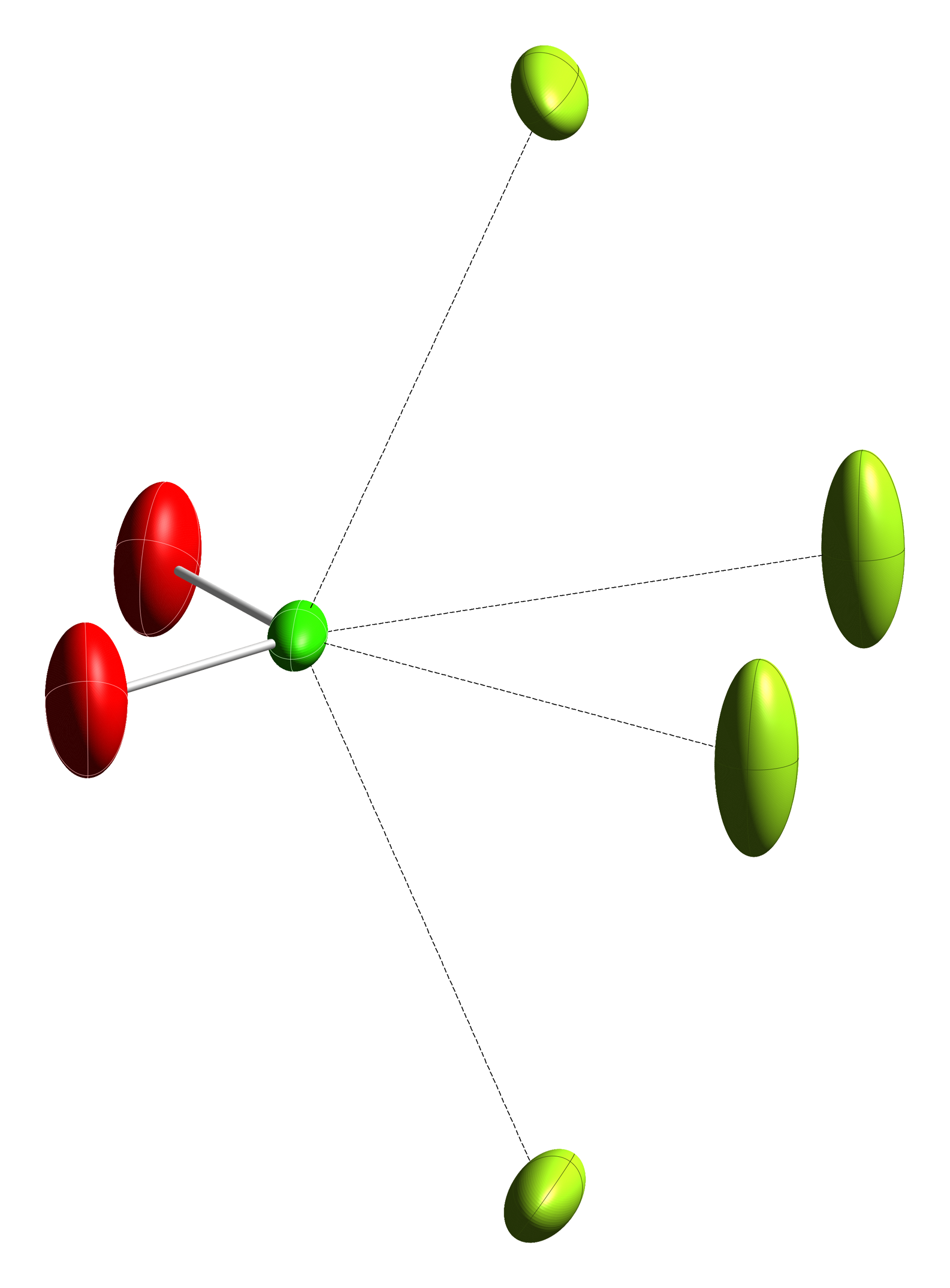
Thermal ellipsoid model of the coordination environment of chlorine in chloryl hexafluoroantimonate, [ClO_{2}][SbF_{6}], showing F–Cl interactions.

There are two categories of chloryl compounds. The first category is colorless, and includes chloryl fluoride (FClO_{2}). These are moderately reactive. Although named as an ionic "chloryl" compound, chloryl fluoride is more a covalent compound than an ionic compound of fluoride and chloryl cation.

The second category features red-colored compounds that are highly reactive. These include chloryl fluorosulfate, ClO_{2}SO_{3}F, and dichloryl trisulfate, (ClO_{2})_{2}(S_{3}O_{10}). These chloryl compounds form red solutions in fluorosulfuric acid, and do contain a red-colored ClO^{+}_{2} cation which dissociates in solution. In the solid state, the Raman and infrared spectra indicate strong interactions with the counterion. Not all chloryl compounds in the solid state are necessarily ionic. The reaction products of FClO_{2} with BF_{3} and PF_{5} are assumed to be molecular adducts rather than true salts.

One notable chloryl compound is dichlorine hexoxide, which exists as an ionic compound more accurately described as chloryl perchlorate, [ClO_{2}]^{+}[ClO_{4}]^{−}. It is a red fuming liquid under standard conditions.

Chloryl compounds are best prepared by the reaction of FClO_{2} with a strong Lewis acid. For example:

FClO_{2} + AsF_{5} → [ClO_{2}][AsF_{6}]

Other synthesis routes are also possible, including:

5 ClO_{2} + 3 AsF_{5} → 2 [ClO_{2}][AsF_{6}] + AsF_{3}O + 4 Cl_{2}

Cl_{2}O_{6} + 2 SbF_{5} → [ClO_{2}][SbF_{6}] + SbF_{3}O + FClO_{3}

Metathesis reactions may be carried out with strong Lewis bases. For example, the reaction of the hexafluoroplatinate salt with nitryl fluoride yields the nitronium salt:

[ClO_{2}][PtF_{6}] + FNO_{2} → [NO_{2}][PtF_{6}] + FClO_{2}
