= Gallium perchlorate =

Names
- IUPAC name Gallium(III) perchlorate
- Other names Gallium triperchlorate

Identifiers
CAS Number	19854-31-0 anhydrous; hexahydrate: 17835-81-3
3D model (JSmol)	Interactive image; hexahydrate: Interactive image
ChemSpider	21160667
ECHA InfoCard	100.039.414
EC Number	243-372-1
PubChem CID	22604310; hexahydrate: 177839181
CompTox Dashboard (EPA)	DTXSID20648468; hexahydrate: DTXSID20648468
- InChI: InChI=1S/ClHO4.Ga/c2-1(3,4)5;/h(H,2,3,4,5);/q;+3/p-1 Key: HPVPDKXGJMBPOD-UHFFFAOYSA-M; hexahydrate: InChI=1S/3ClHO4.Ga.6H2O/c3*2-1(3,4)5;;;;;;;/h3*(H,2,3,4,5);;6*1H2/q;;;+3;;;;;;/p-3 Key: IBHSOJIIHNMULD-UHFFFAOYSA-K
- SMILES: [Ga+3].[O-]Cl(=O)(=O)=O.[O-]Cl(=O)(=O)=O.[O-]Cl(=O)(=O)=O; hexahydrate: O.O.O.O.O.O.[O-]Cl(=O)(=O)=O.[O-]Cl(=O)(=O)=O.[O-]Cl(=O)(=O)=O.[Ga+3]

Properties
Chemical formula	Ga(ClO_{4})_{3}
Molar mass	368.06 g/mol
Appearance	Deliquescent crystals (hydrates)
Solubility in water	Very soluble in water
- Except where otherwise noted, data are given for materials in their standard state (at 25 °C [77 °F], 100 kPa). Infobox references

Gallium perchlorate is an inorganic compound with the chemical formula Ga(ClO_{4})_{3}. It is the gallium salt of perchloric acid. Gallium perchlorate is strongly deliquescent and highly soluble in water, and several hydrated forms are known, including the hexahydrate and nonahydrate.

== Preparation ==
Hydrated gallium perchlorate can be prepared by reacting gallium(III) oxide with aqueous perchloric acid. Crystals of the nonahydrate have been obtained by treating gallium(III) oxide with 70% perchloric acid, followed by recrystallization from water and evaporation of the solution at room temperature.

Ga_{2}O_{3} + 6 HClO_{4} → 2 Ga(ClO_{4})_{3} + 3 H_{2}O

The hexahydrate can also be prepared directly from metallic gallium. Gallium dissolves rapidly in constant-boiling 72% perchloric acid, and cooling the resulting solution causes gallium perchlorate hexahydrate to crystallize.

Anhydrous solutions of gallium perchlorate in methanol can be prepared by metathesis of anhydrous gallium trichloride with silver perchlorate. The precipitation of silver chloride drives the reaction:

GaCl_{3} + 3 AgClO_{4} → Ga(ClO_{4})_{3} + 3 AgCl ↓

== Properties and structure ==
Gallium perchlorate is very deliquescent and highly soluble in water. The hexahydrate is difficult to dehydrate directly; attempts to remove its water of crystallization by heating produce a basic salt instead. Gallium perchlorate decomposes at approximately 155 °C under vacuum and 175 °C in air. The nonahydrate, Ga(ClO_{4})_{3}·9H_{2}O, crystallizes in the trigonal crystal system in space group R3̅c. Its structure contains octahedral [Ga(H_{2}O)_{6}]^{3+} ions. These aqua complexes are linked through additional water molecules by hydrogen bonding, while the columns of hydrated gallium ions are separated by approximately tetrahedral perchlorate ions. Hydrogen bonding involving both coordinated and uncoordinated water molecules and the perchlorate ions produces a three-dimensional structure. In aqueous gallium perchlorate solutions, gallium(III) occurs predominantly as the hexaaqua ion [Ga(H_{2}O)_{6}]^{3+}. Raman spectroscopic studies found no significant inner-sphere complex formation between gallium(III) and perchlorate over the investigated concentration and temperature ranges.

== Applications ==
Gallium perchlorate has been investigated as a Lewis acid catalyst in organic synthesis. It catalyzes the formation of substituted quinoxalines by reaction of α-hydroxy ketones with o-phenylenediamines. In the reported procedure, 10 mol% gallium perchlorate in ethanol at room temperature gave the quinoxaline products in good yields.
