= Tin(II) perchlorate =

Names
- Other names Stannous perchlorate

Identifiers
CAS Number	25253-54-7
3D model (JSmol)	Interactive image; trihydrate: Interactive image
- InChI: InChI=1S/2ClHO4.Sn/c2*2-1(3,4)5;/h2*(H,2,3,4,5);/q;;+2/p-2 Key: KFOXNAKREUIMGQ-UHFFFAOYSA-L; trihydrate: InChI=1S/2ClHO4.3H2O.Sn/c2*2-1(3,4)5;;;;/h2*(H,2,3,4,5);3*1H2;/q;;;;;+2/p-2 Key: XZUXQMJNFIGNRR-UHFFFAOYSA-L
- SMILES: [Sn+2].[O-]Cl(=O)(=O)=O.[O-]Cl(=O)(=O)=O; trihydrate: [Sn+2].[O-]Cl(=O)(=O)=O.[O-]Cl(=O)(=O)=O.O.O.O

Properties
Chemical formula	Sn(ClO_{4})_{2}
Molar mass	317.60 g/mol
Appearance	Colourless crystals (trihydrate)
Density	2.919 g/cm^{3} (trihydrate, 180 K)

Structure
Crystal structure	Hexagonal (trihydrate)
Space group	P6_{3} (No. 173; trihydrate)
Lattice constant	a = 7.0701(10) Å (trihydrate), c = 9.7631(15) Å (trihydrate)
Formula units (Z)	2 (trihydrate)
- Except where otherwise noted, data are given for materials in their standard state (at 25 °C [77 °F], 100 kPa). Infobox references

Tin(II) perchlorate is an inorganic compound of tin and perchloric acid with the formula Sn(ClO_{4})_{2}. Tin is present in the +2 oxidation state. The best-characterized solid form is the trihydrate, Sn(ClO_{4})_{2}·3H_{2}O, which consists of trigonal-pyramidal [Sn(H_{2}O)_{3}]^{2+} ions and perchlorate anions.

== Preparation ==
Tin(II) perchlorate solutions can be prepared by reducing copper(II) perchlorate with metallic tin under an inert atmosphere. The reaction is quantitative, with copper metal precipitating while tin is oxidized to Sn(II).

Sn + Cu(ClO_{4})_{2} → Sn(ClO_{4})_{2} + Cu

Tin(II) perchlorate trihydrate can be crystallized by carrying out this reaction in 60% perchloric acid and cooling the resulting solution. Crystallization at 253 K gives colourless crystals of Sn(ClO_{4})_{2}·3H_{2}O. The trihydrate had previously been prepared and characterized by powder X-ray diffraction, infrared spectroscopy and Mössbauer spectroscopy.

Tin(II) perchlorate can also be generated under nonaqueous conditions by reaction of metallic tin with silver perchlorate in benzene, with precipitation of metallic silver.

Sn + 2AgClO_{4} → Sn(ClO_{4})_{2} + 2Ag

== Properties ==
=== Crystal structure ===
Tin(II) perchlorate trihydrate crystallizes in the hexagonal crystal system, space group P6_{3} (No. 173), with lattice parameters a = 7.0701(10) Å and c = 9.7631(15) Å at 180 K and two formula units per unit cell. Its crystallographic density is 2.919 g cm^{−3}.

The tin atom lies on a crystallographic threefold rotation axis and is coordinated by three water molecules in a trigonal-pyramidal arrangement, forming [Sn(H_{2}O)_{3}]^{2+} ions. The Sn–O bond length is 2.201(7) Å. This low coordination number and asymmetric environment are attributed to the stereochemical activity of the lone pair on Sn^{2+}.

The tetrahedral perchlorate ions also lie on crystallographic threefold axes and occupy spaces between the SnO_{3} pyramids. Hydrogen bonds between the coordinated water molecules and perchlorate oxygen atoms connect the ions into sheets parallel to the (001) plane.

=== Redox chemistry ===
Tin(II) perchlorate is sensitive to oxidation in aqueous solution. Acidic solutions kept under an inert atmosphere have been reported to remain stable for at least a week, whereas dissolved oxygen oxidizes Sn^{2+} to Sn^{4+}. Perchlorate ions can participate in the oxidation chemistry under these conditions.

The standard electrode potential of the aqueous Sn^{4+}/Sn^{2+} couple has been redetermined using tin perchlorate solutions in strongly acidic perchlorate–chloride media. Extrapolation of the measured formal potentials to zero ionic strength gave E° = 0.384 ± 0.020 V.

Tin(II) in perchlorate solution also acts as a reducing agent toward other metal ions. Its oxidation by vanadium(V) in aqueous perchlorate media has been studied kinetically.

=== Complex formation ===
Tin(II) perchlorate forms coordination compounds with a range of neutral donor ligands. Adducts with triphenylphosphine oxide, dimethylformamide and dimethyl sulfoxide have been reported.

A series of twelve tin(II) perchlorate complexes with aromatic Schiff bases has also been prepared. These compounds have a 1:3 metal-to-ligand ratio and behave as 1:3 electrolytes in acetone, indicating that the perchlorate ions remain outside the primary coordination sphere. Infrared spectra likewise indicate essentially ionic, tetrahedral perchlorate ions, while coordination occurs principally through the azomethine nitrogen atoms of the Schiff bases.

== Applications ==
Tin(II) perchlorate has been investigated as a reagent in organic synthesis. Tin(II) perchlorate generated from tin and silver perchlorate was used to promote alkylation of aromatic compounds with alcohols or paraformaldehyde.
