= Indium perchlorate =

Names
- Other names Indium triperchlorate, indium(III) perchlorate

Identifiers
CAS Number	13529-74-3
3D model (JSmol)	Interactive image
ChemSpider	9387179
ECHA InfoCard	100.033.507
EC Number	236-874-7
PubChem CID	11212117
- InChI: InChI=1S/3ClHO4.In/c3*2-1(3,4)5;/h3*(H,2,3,4,5);/q;;;+3/p-3 Key: TWFKOYFJBHUHCH-UHFFFAOYSA-K
- SMILES: [O-]Cl(=O)(=O)=O.[O-]Cl(=O)(=O)=O.[O-]Cl(=O)(=O)=O.[In+3]

Properties
Chemical formula	In(ClO_{4})_{3}
Molar mass	413.17
Appearance	colorless crystals
Solubility in water	soluble

Hazards
- Occupational safety and health (OHS/OSH)
Main hazards	Oxidizer

Related compounds
Other anions	indium nitrate, indium sulfate
Other cations	aluminum perchlorate, gallium perchlorate, thallium perchlorate
Related compounds	indium(I) perchlorate, indium chlorate
- Except where otherwise noted, data are given for materials in their standard state (at 25 °C [77 °F], 100 kPa). Infobox references

Indium perchlorate is the inorganic compound with the chemical formula In(ClO_{4})_{3}. The compound is an indium salt of perchloric acid.

== Synthesis ==
Dissolving indium hydroxide in perchloric acid:

In(OH)_{3} + 3HClO_{4} → In(ClO_{4})_{3} + 3H_{2}O

== Physical properties ==
Indium(III) perchlorate forms colorless crystals. It is soluble in water and ethanol.

The compound forms a hydrate In(ClO_{4})_{3} • 8H_{2}O, that melts in its own crystallization water at 80 °C.

The octahydrate is easily soluble in ethanol and acetic acid.
