= Mansfieldite =

Arsenate mineral

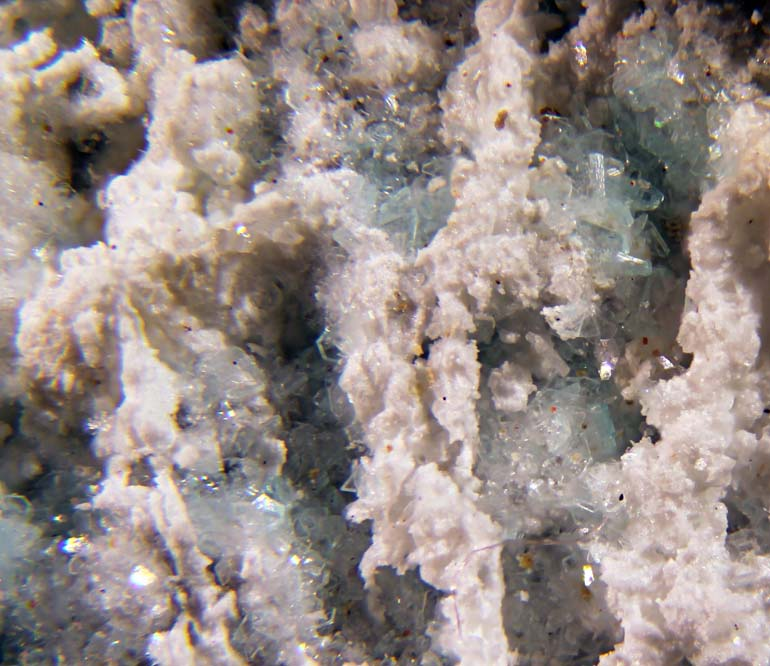

General
- Category: Minerals
- Formula: AlAsO_{4}·2H_{2}O
- IMA symbol: Mfd
- Strunz classification: 08.CD.10
- Dana classification: 40.04.01.04
- Crystal system: Orthorhombic
- Crystal class: Orthorhombic-Dipyramidal (mmm); H-M symbol: (2/m 2/m 2/m)
- Space group: Pbca
- Unit cell: 876.8 Å³

Identification
- Formula mass: 201.93 gm
- Color: White, light gray
- Crystal habit: Spherical, encrustations
- Cleavage: Indistinct on {201} and on {001} and {100} in traces
- Fracture: Sub-conchoidal
- Mohs scale hardness: 3.5–4
- Luster: Vitreous
- Streak: White
- Diaphaneity: Transparent, transculent
- Specific gravity: 3.03
- Density: 3.03
- Optical properties: Biaxial (+)
- Refractive index: n_{α} = 1.622 – 1.631 n_{β} = 1.624 – 1.649 n_{γ} = 1.642 – 1.663
- Birefringence: 0.020 – 0.032
- 2V angle: Measured 30°–68°, calculated 38°–82°
- Dispersion: None
- Common impurities: Cobalt

Mansfieldite is an uncommon mineral that was named after an American geologist, George Rogers Mansfield. It has been considered a valid species since 1948. It is a member of the variscite group. Mansfieldite creates a series with scorodite, and it is the aluminium analogue of said gem. Mansfieldite is colorless in transmitted light. It is mostly made out of oxygen (47.54%). Other components include arsenic (37.1%), aluminium (13.36%) and hydrogen (2%). Mansfieldite crystals form due to hydrothermal origin in altered and mineralized andesitic pyroclastic rocks. Due to its size, mansfieldite is hard to see even under a microscope. The pink variation of the mineral is due to cobalt impurities, otherwise it is white to light gray. It can be found in the US, Mexico, France, Algeria, England, Australia, Germany, Algeria and Kazakhstan.
