= Dichlorine hexoxide =

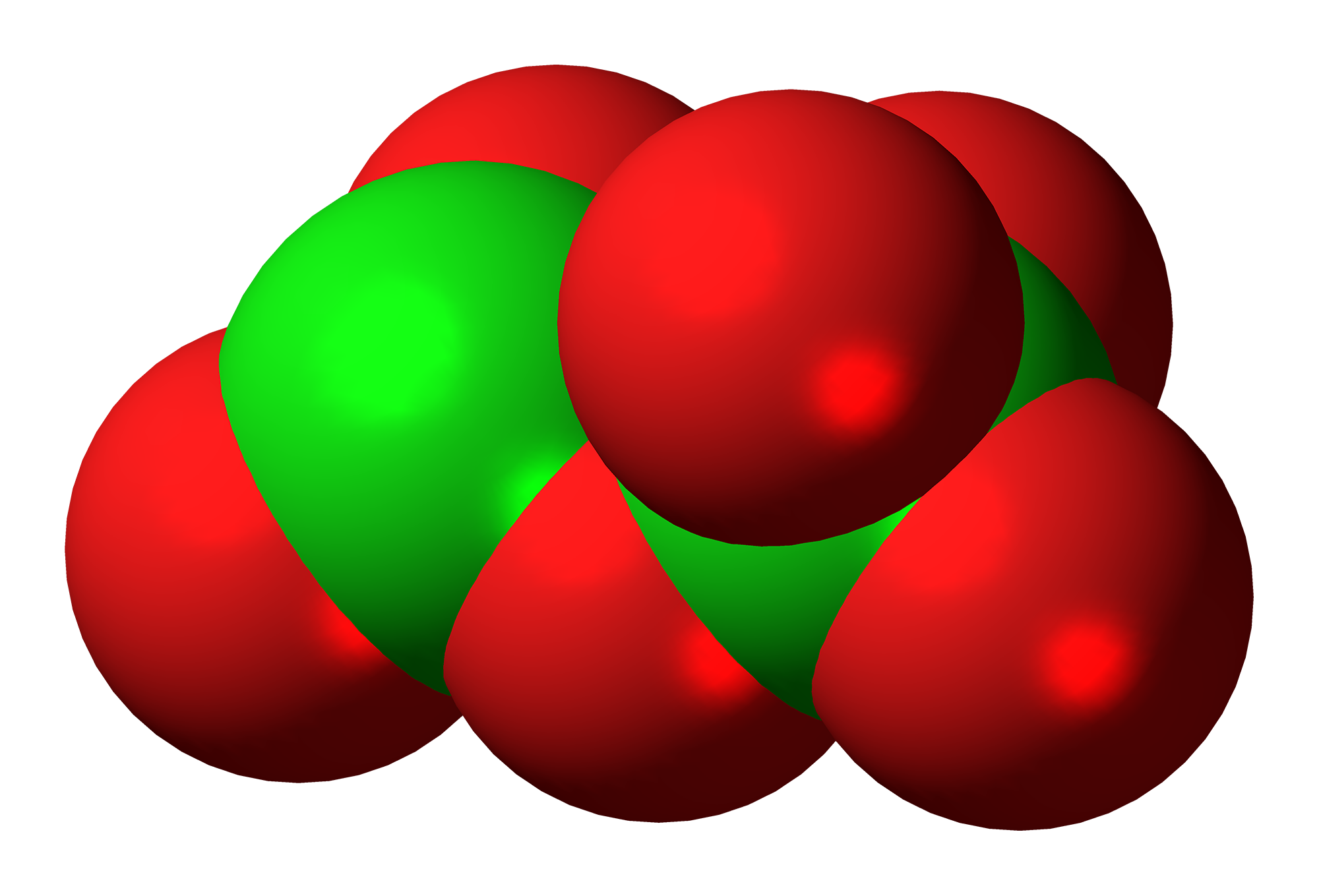

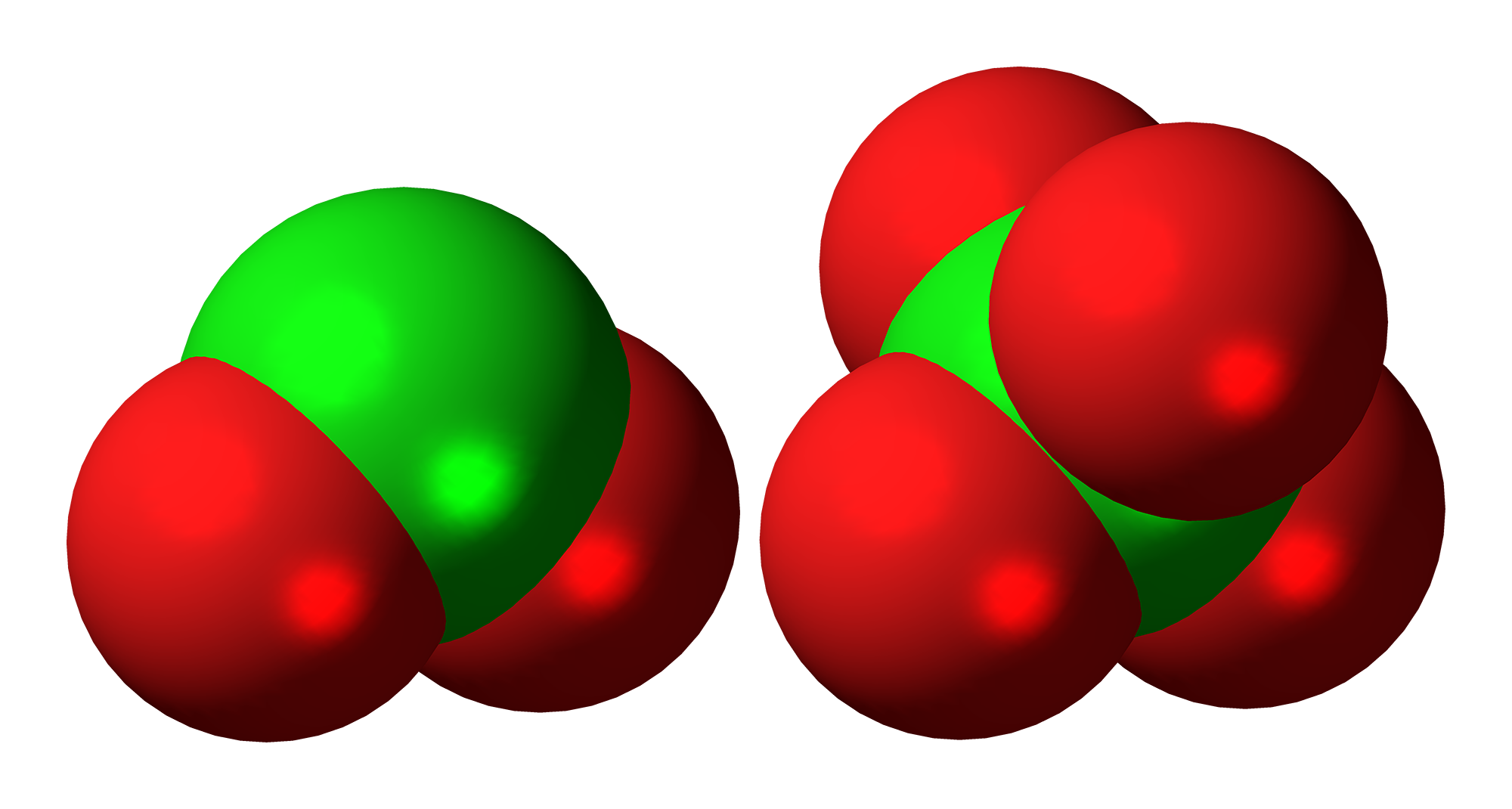

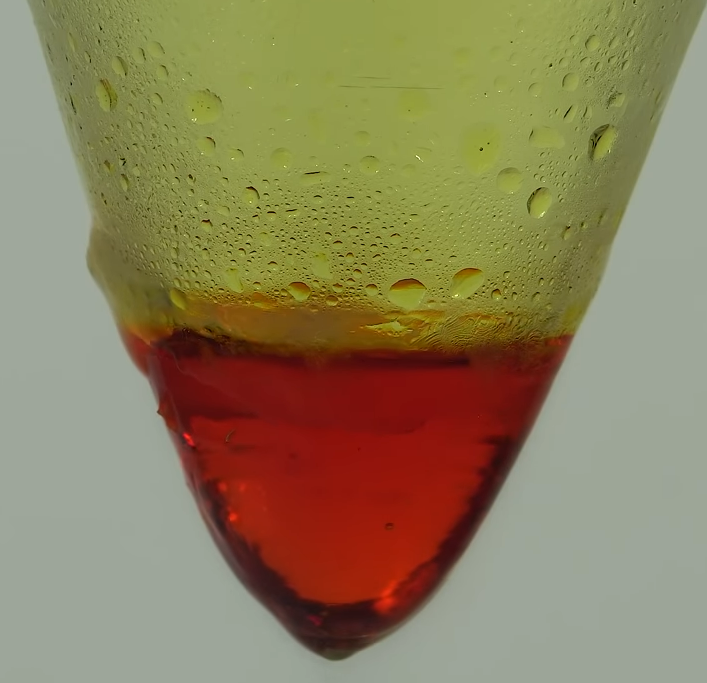

Names
- IUPAC name Dichlorine hexoxide
- Other names Chlorine trioxide; Chloryl perchlorate; Chlorine(V,VII) oxide

Identifiers
| CAS Number | 12442-63-6 |
| 3D model (JSmol) | Interactive image; Interactive image |
| ChemSpider | 9564507 incorrect charge |
| PubChem CID | 101946322 |
- InChI: InChI=1S/Cl2O6/c3-1(4)8-2(5,6)7 Key: BMVIIZAOKBSWDS-UHFFFAOYSA-N
- SMILES: O=[Cl](=O)O[Cl](=O)(=O)=O; O=[Cl+]=O.[O-]Cl(=O)(=O)=O

Properties
| Chemical formula | Cl_{2}O_{6} |
| Molar mass | 166.901 g/mol |
| Appearance | red liquid |
| Density | 1.65 g/cm^{3} |
| Melting point | 3.5 °C (38.3 °F; 276.6 K) |
| Boiling point | 200 °C (392 °F; 473 K) |
| Solubility in water | Reacts |

Hazards
- Occupational safety and health (OHS/OSH)
| Main hazards | oxidizer |
- Except where otherwise noted, data are given for materials in their standard state (at 25 °C [77 °F], 100 kPa). verify (what is ?) Infobox references

Dichlorine hexoxide is the chemical compound with the molecular formula Cl_{2}O_{6} or O_{2}Cl−O−ClO_{3}, which is correct for its gaseous state. However, in liquid or solid form, this chlorine oxide ionizes into the dark red ionic compound chloryl perchlorate or dioxochloronium(V) perchlorate [ClO_{2}]^{+}[ClO_{4}]^{−}, which may be thought of as the mixed anhydride of chloric and perchloric acids. This compound is a notable perchlorating agent.

== Molecular structure ==
It was originally reported to exist as the monomeric chlorine trioxide ClO_{3} in gas phase, but was later shown to remain an oxygen-bridged dimer after evaporation and until thermal decomposition into chlorine perchlorate, Cl_{2}O_{4}, and oxygen. The compound ClO_{3} was then rediscovered.

It is a dark red fuming liquid at room temperature that crystallizes as a red ionic compound, chloryl perchlorate, [ClO_{2}]^{+}[ClO_{4}]^{−}. The red color shows the presence of chloryl ions. Thus, chlorine's formal oxidation state in this compound remains a mixture of chlorine(V) and chlorine(VII) both in the gas phase and when condensed; however by breaking one oxygen-chlorine bond some electron density does shifts towards the chlorine(VII).

== Properties ==
Cl_{2}O_{6} is diamagnetic and is a very strong oxidizing agent. Although stable at room temperature, it explodes violently on contact with organic compounds It is a strong dehydrating agent:

Cl_{2}O_{6} + H_{2}O → HClO_{4} + HClO_{3}

Many reactions involving Cl_{2}O_{6} reflect its ionic structure, [ClO_{2}]^{+}[ClO_{4}]^{−}, including the following:

NO_{2}F + Cl_{2}O_{6} → [NO_{2}]^{+}ClO^{−}_{4} + ClO_{2}F
NO + Cl_{2}O_{6} → [NO]^{+}ClO^{−}_{4} + ClO_{2}
2 V_{2}O_{5} + 12 Cl_{2}O_{6} → 4 VO(ClO_{4})_{3} + 12 ClO_{2} + 3 O_{2}
SnCl_{4} + 6 Cl_{2}O_{6} → [ClO_{2}]_{2}[Sn(ClO_{4})_{6}] + 4 ClO_{2} + 2 Cl_{2}

It reacts with gold to produce the chloryl salt [ClO_{2}]^{+}[Au(ClO_{4})_{4}]^{−}:

2 Au + 6 Cl_{2}O_{6} → 2 [ClO_{2}]^{+}[Au(ClO_{4})_{4}]^{−} + Cl_{2}

Several other transition metal perchlorate complexes are prepared using dichlorine hexoxide.

Nevertheless, it can also react as a source of the ClO_{3} radical:

2 AsF_{5} + Cl_{2}O_{6} → 2 ClO_{3}AsF_{5}

== Synthesis ==
4 ClO_{2} + 2 O_{3} → 2 Cl_{2}O_{6} + O_{2} (under ultraviolet light)
