= Aluminium nitrate =

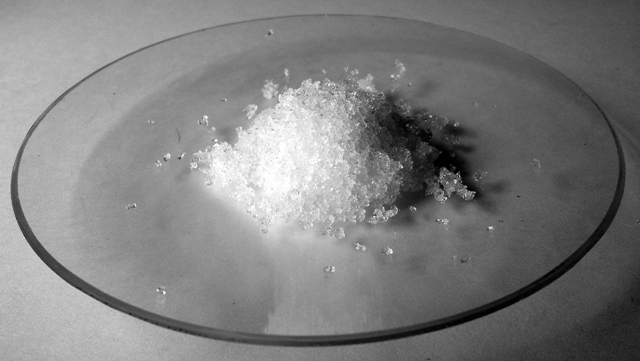

Names
- IUPAC name Aluminium nitrate
- Other names Nitric Aluminum salt aluminum nitrate aluminium(III) nitrate

Identifiers
CAS Number	13473-90-0; 7784-27-2 (nonahydrate)
3D model (JSmol)	Interactive image
ChEBI	CHEBI:231496
ChemSpider	24267
ECHA InfoCard	100.033.396
EC Number	236-751-8
PubChem CID	26053
RTECS number	BD1040000 (anhydrous) BD1050000 (nonahydrate)
UNII	HUO854648Y; 8MC6621V1H (nonhydrate)
UN number	1438
CompTox Dashboard (EPA)	DTXSID7040318
- InChI: InChI=1S/Al.3NO3/c;3*2-1(3)4/q+3;3*-1 Key: JLDSOYXADOWAKB-UHFFFAOYSA-N; InChI=1/Al.3NO3/c;3*2-1(3)4/q+3;3*-1 Key: JLDSOYXADOWAKB-UHFFFAOYAJ
- SMILES: [Al+3].O=[N+]([O-])[O-].[O-][N+]([O-])=O.[O-][N+]([O-])=O

Properties
Chemical formula	Al(NO_{3})_{3}
Molar mass	212.996 g/mol (anhydrous); 375.134 g/mol (nonahydrate)
Appearance	White crystals, solid hygroscopic
Odor	odorless
Density	1.72 g/cm^{3} (nonahydrate)
Melting point	66 °C (151 °F; 339 K) (anhydrous); 73.9 °C (165.0 °F; 347.0 K) (nonahydrate)
Boiling point	150 °C (302 °F; 423 K) (nonahydrate) decomposes
Solubility in water	anhydrous: 60.0 g/100ml (0°C); 73.9 g/100ml (20 °C); 160 g/100ml (100 °C) nonahydrate: 67.3 g/100 mL
Solubility in methanol	14.45 g/100ml
Solubility in ethanol	8.63 g/100ml
Solubility in ethylene glycol	18.32 g/100ml
Refractive index (n_{D})	1.54

Hazards
- GHS labelling
Pictograms	(GHS03: Oxidizing) (GHS05: Corrosive) (GHS06: Toxic) (GHS07: Exclamation mark) (GHS08: Health hazard)
Signal word	Danger
Hazard statements	H271, H272, H301, H315, H318, H319, H361
Precautionary statements	P201, P202, P210, P220, P221, P264, P270, P280, P281, P283, P301+P310, P302+P352, P305+P351+P338, P306+P360, P308+P313, P310, P321, P330, P332+P313, P337+P313, P362, P370+P378, P371+P380+P375, P405, P501
NFPA 704 (fire diamond)	2 0 1 OX
Flash point	35 °C (95 °F; 308 K) (nonahydrate)
- Lethal dose or concentration (LD, LC)
LD_{50} (median dose)	4280 mg/kg, oral (rat)
- NIOSH (US health exposure limits)
PEL (Permissible)	none
REL (Recommended)	2 mg/m^{3}
IDLH (Immediate danger)	N.D.
Safety data sheet (SDS)	External MSDS
- Except where otherwise noted, data are given for materials in their standard state (at 25 °C [77 °F], 100 kPa). verify (what is ?) Infobox references

Aluminium nitrate is a white, water-soluble salt of aluminium and nitric acid, most commonly existing as the crystalline hydrate, aluminium nitrate nonahydrate, Al(NO_{3})_{3}·9H_{2}O.

== Preparation ==
Aluminium nitrate cannot be synthesized by the reaction of aluminium with concentrated nitric acid, as the aluminium forms a passivation layer.

Aluminium nitrate may instead be prepared by the reaction of nitric acid with aluminium chloride. Nitrosyl chloride is produced as a by-product; it bubbles out of the solution as a gas. More conveniently, the salt can be made by reacting nitric acid with aluminium hydroxide.

Al(OH)_{3} + 3HNO_{3} → Al(NO_{3})_{3} + 3H_{2}O

Aluminium nitrate may also be prepared a metathesis reaction between aluminium sulfate and a nitrate salt with a suitable cation such as barium, strontium, calcium, silver, or lead. e.g.

Al_{2}(SO_{4})_{3} + 3 Ba(NO_{3})_{2} → 2 Al(NO_{3})_{3} + 3 BaSO_{4}.

== Uses ==
Aluminium nitrate is a strong oxidizing agent. It is used in tanning leather, antiperspirants, corrosion inhibitors, extraction of uranium, petroleum refining, and as a nitrating agent.

The nonahydrate and other hydrated aluminium nitrates have many applications. These salts are used to produce alumina for preparation of insulating papers, in cathode ray tube heating elements, and on transformer core laminates. The hydrated salts are also used for the extraction of actinide elements.

It is used in the laboratory and classroom such as in the reaction

Al(NO_{3})_{3} + 3 NaOH → Al(OH)_{3} + 3 NaNO_{3}

It is, however, much less often encountered than aluminium chloride and aluminium sulfate.

== See also ==
- Aluminium acetate
- Aluminium arsenate
