= Cadmium perchlorate =

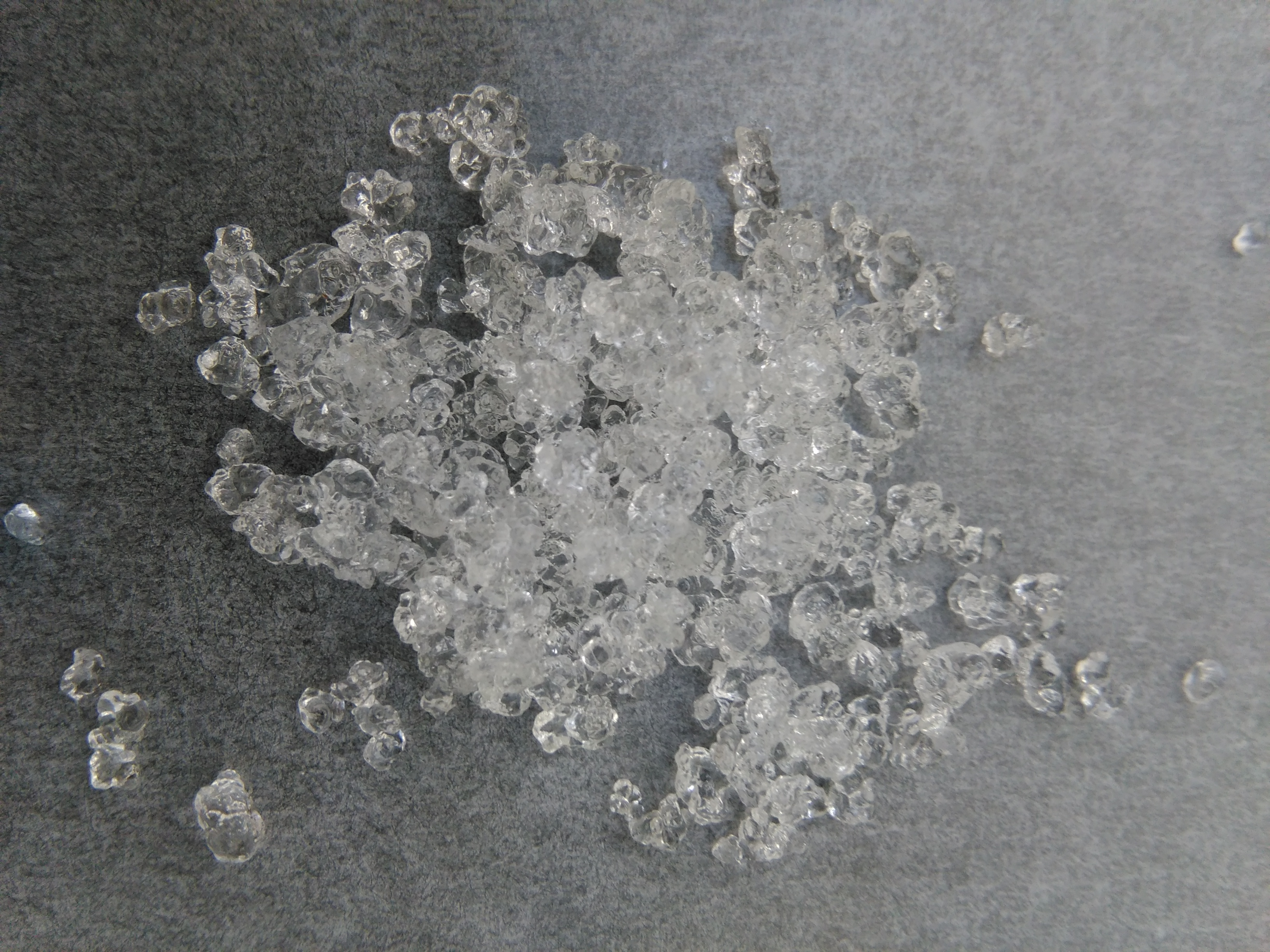

Names
- Other names Cadmium(II) perchlorate

Identifiers
CAS Number	anhydrous: 13760-37-7; hydrate: 79490-00-9; hexahydrate: 10326-28-0
3D model (JSmol)	anhydrous: Interactive image; hexahydrate: Interactive image
ChemSpider	anhydrous: 175869; hexahydrate: 21241376
EC Number	hexahydrate: 629-339-8
PubChem CID	anhydrous: 203082; hexahydrate: 71317310
CompTox Dashboard (EPA)	anhydrous: DTXSID70160246; hexahydrate: DTXSID001102990
- InChI: anhydrous: InChI=1S/Cd.2ClHO4/c;2*2-1(3,4)5/h;2*(H,2,3,4,5)/q+2;;/p-2 Key: PSIBWKDABMPMJN-UHFFFAOYSA-L; hexahydrate: InChI=1S/Cd.2ClHO4.6H2O/c;2*2-1(3,4)5;;;;;;/h;2*(H,2,3,4,5);6*1H2/q+2;;;;;;;;/p-2 Key: PQJZOTJHMRJOEM-UHFFFAOYSA-L
- SMILES: anhydrous: [O-]Cl(=O)(=O)=O.[O-]Cl(=O)(=O)=O.[Cd+2]; hexahydrate: O.O.O.O.O.O.[O-]Cl(=O)(=O)=O.[O-]Cl(=O)(=O)=O.[Cd+2]

Properties
Chemical formula	Cd(ClO_{4})_{2}
Molar mass	311.31 g/mol
Appearance	Colorless crystalline solid
Solubility in water	Very soluble in water

Hazards
- GHS labelling
Pictograms	(GHS03: Oxidizing) (GHS07: Exclamation mark) (GHS09: Environmental hazard)
Signal word	Danger
Hazard statements	H272, H302, H312, H332, H410
Precautionary statements	P210, P220, P261, P264, P270, P271, P273, P280, P301+P317, P302+P352, P304+P340, P317, P321, P330, P362+P364, P370+P378, P391, P501
- Except where otherwise noted, data are given for materials in their standard state (at 25 °C [77 °F], 100 kPa). Infobox references

Cadmium perchlorate is an inorganic compound of cadmium and the perchlorate ion, with the formula Cd(ClO_{4})_{2}. It is known in anhydrous form and as hydrated salts, most notably the hexahydrate Cd(ClO_{4})_{2}·6H_{2}O. The hexahydrate is a colorless, highly water-soluble crystalline solid.

== Preparation ==
Cadmium perchlorate can be prepared by dissolving cadmium carbonate in aqueous perchloric acid:

CdCO_{3} + 2 HClO_{4} → Cd(ClO_{4})_{2} + H_{2}O + CO_{2}

Concentration and crystallization of the resulting solution gives cadmium perchlorate hexahydrate. Anhydrous Cd(ClO_{4})_{2} can be obtained by dehydration of the hydrate under reduced pressure at elevated temperature.

== Properties ==
=== Hydrates and crystal structure ===
Cadmium perchlorate commonly crystallizes as the hexahydrate, Cd(ClO_{4})_{2}·6H_{2}O. The hexahydrate crystallizes in the trigonal crystal system, space group P3m1 (No. 156), with one formula unit per unit cell. Its structure is closely related to that of magnesium perchlorate hexahydrate. Powder diffraction measurements give the three strongest d-spacings as approximately 3.995, 4.223 and 2.902 Å. The hexahydrate loses water on heating and forms lower hydrates before the anhydrous salt is obtained.

=== Solubility ===
Cadmium perchlorate is very soluble in water. The hexahydrate is considerably more soluble than the anhydrous compound. The anhydrous salt is also soluble in polar organic solvents including ethanol, acetonitrile and nitromethane.

=== Thermal decomposition ===
Anhydrous cadmium perchlorate decomposes on strong heating. Slow decomposition has been reported around 330–340 °C, becoming rapid around 390–400 °C. The overall decomposition can be represented approximately as:

Cd(ClO_{4})_{2} → CdCl_{2} + 4 O_{2}

Because perchlorate decomposition pathways can depend on heating rate and sample conditions, this equation represents the overall stoichiometry rather than necessarily a single elementary step.

== Coordination chemistry ==
Cadmium perchlorate is widely used as a soluble source of Cd^{2+} in coordination chemistry because perchlorate is often only weakly coordinating. Nevertheless, perchlorate can coordinate directly to cadmium in suitable complexes. For example, in [Cd(2,2′-bipyridine)_{2}(H_{2}O)(ClO_{4})]ClO_{4}, one perchlorate ion is coordinated to Cd(II), giving a six-coordinate cadmium center. Other cadmium perchlorate complexes contain directly coordinated perchlorate ligands, including octahedral Cd(II) complexes with nitrogen-donor ligands.

== Applications ==
Cadmium perchlorate is used primarily as a laboratory reagent and as a precursor to cadmium coordination compounds. It has also been used as a cadmium source in solution-phase syntheses of cadmium-containing materials, including cadmium sulfide nanostructures.

== Safety ==
Cadmium perchlorate combines the toxicity of soluble cadmium compounds with the oxidizing properties of perchlorate salts. It is classified as an oxidizer, is harmful if swallowed, inhaled or in contact with skin, and is very toxic to aquatic life with long-lasting effects. It should be handled as a toxic oxidizer and kept away from combustible and reducing materials.
