= Nitrosyl perchlorate =

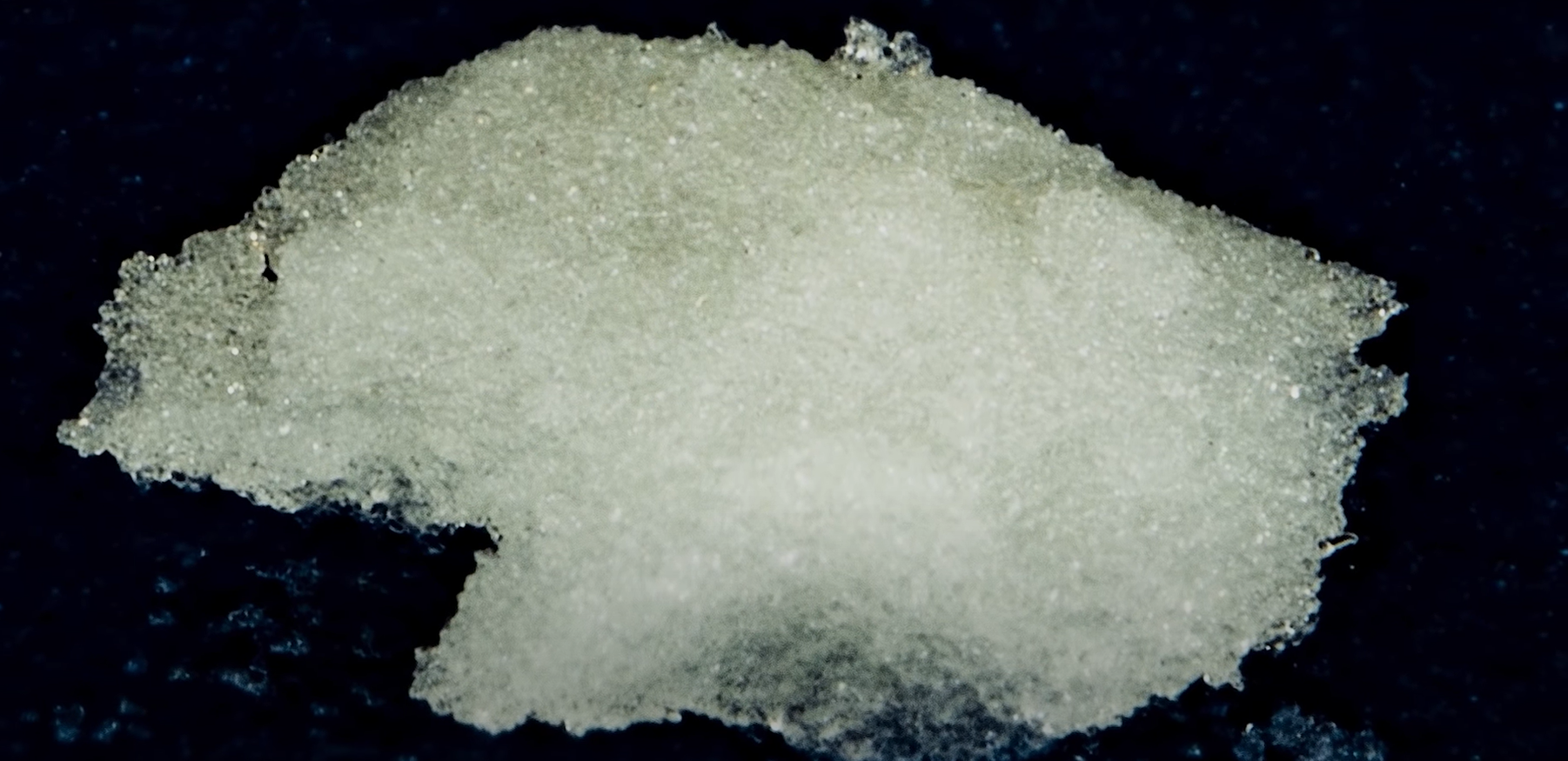

Names
- IUPAC names Perchloryl nitrite Nitrosonium perchlorate
- Other names Nitrosyl perchlorate Perchloric nitrous anhydride

Identifiers
CAS Number	15605-28-4
3D model (JSmol)	Interactive image
ChemSpider	154629
PubChem CID	177613
CompTox Dashboard (EPA)	DTXSID60935364
- InChI: InChI=1S/ClNO5/c3-1(4,5)7-2-6 Key: ONKVXKHGDFDPFZ-UHFFFAOYSA-N
- SMILES: N(=O)OCl(=O)(=O)=O

Properties
Chemical formula	NOClO_{4}
Molar mass	129.46 g/mol
Appearance	white solid
Density	2.169 g/cm^{3}
Melting point	100 °C (212 °F; 373 K) (decomposes)
Solubility in water	Reacts

Structure
Crystal structure	Rhombic

Thermochemistry
Std enthalpy of formation (Δ_{f}H^{⦵}_{298})	−154.0 kJ/mol
- Except where otherwise noted, data are given for materials in their standard state (at 25 °C [77 °F], 100 kPa). Infobox references

Nitrosyl perchlorate or nitrosonium perchlorate is the inorganic compound with the formula NO(ClO_{4}). A hygroscopic white solid, it is the salt of the nitrosonium cation with the perchlorate anion. It is an oxidant and strong electrophile, but has fallen out of use with the availability of the closely related salt nitrosonium tetrafluoroborate NO(BF_{4}).

== Preparation ==
Nitrosyl perchlorate was first produced in 1909 by passing dinitrogen trioxide gas into concentrated perchloric acid:

N_{2}O_{3} + 2 HClO_{4} → 2 NOClO_{4} + H_{2}O

A standard laboratory preparation involves treating a mixture of nitric oxide and nitrogen dioxide with concentrated perchloric acid:

NO_{2} + NO + 2 HClO_{4} → 2 NOClO_{4} + H_{2}O

It can also be prepared by passing dinitrogen trioxide gas into a mixture of sodium perchlorate and sulfuric acid.

== Structure ==
The structure of NOClO_{4} has not been elucidated by X-ray crystallography. However, the Raman spectroscopy of NOClO_{4} suggests that nitrosyl perchlorate consists of distinct NO^{+} and ClO_{4}^{–} ions.

== Properties ==
Nitrosyl perchlorate decomposes at 100 °C to nitronium perchlorate, which then subsequently decomposes into chlorine and nitrogen oxides.

This compound hydrolyzes in water to form nitrous acid and perchloric acid:

NOClO_{4} + H_{2}O → HNO_{2} + HClO_{4}

With a strong base, such as sodium hydroxide, it produces perchlorate, nitrite and water. This reaction was used to calculate the heat of formation of nitrosyl perchlorate. As a strong oxidizer, nitrosyl perchlorate reacts explosively with various organic compounds, such as ethanol, acetone, ether, and aniline.

== Uses ==
Nitrosyl perchlorate is used in the laboratory as a perchlorating agent. Although it has been investigated as a potential rocket propellant, it has not been commercialized.
