= Nitronium perchlorate =

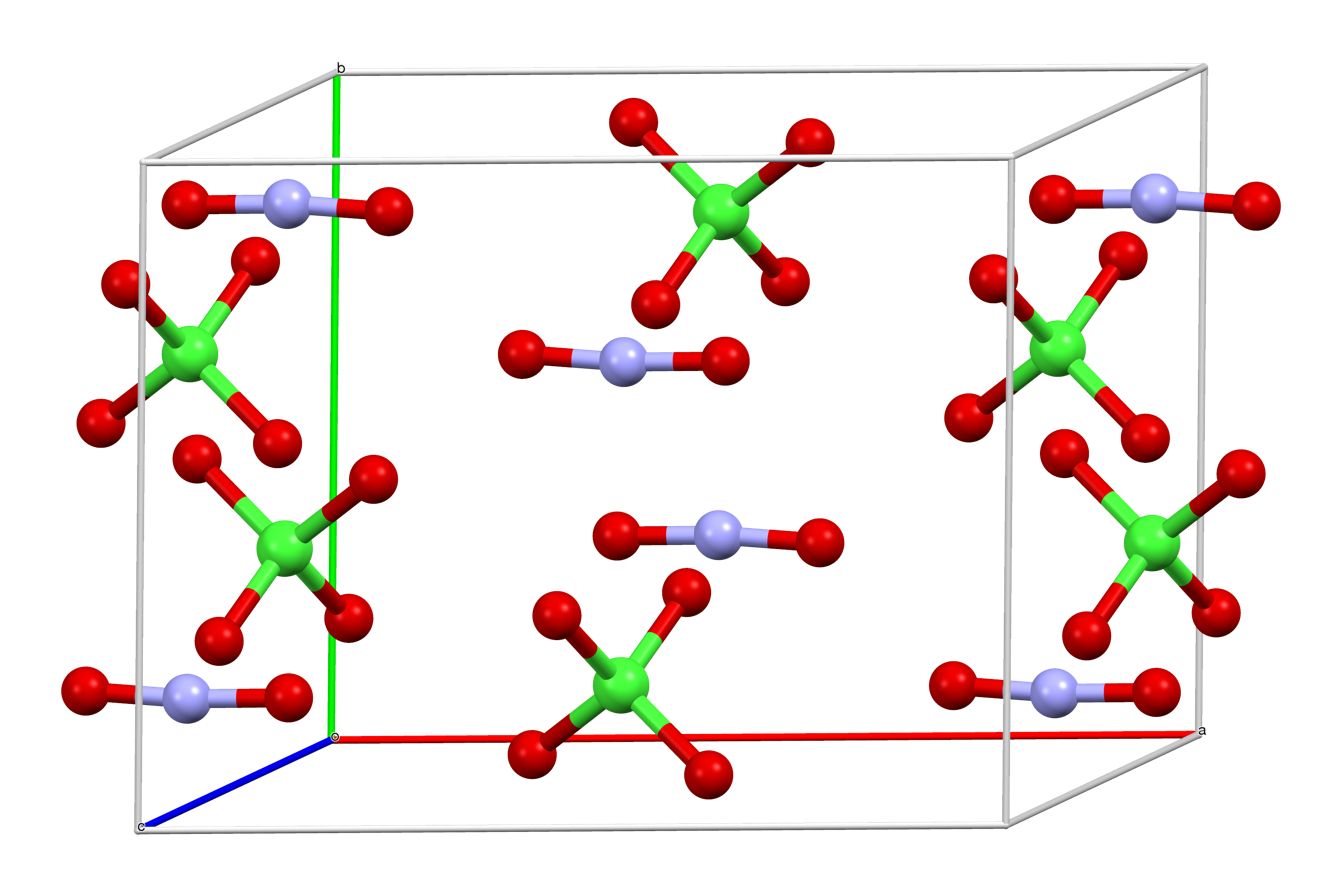
- Ball-and-stick model of the unit cell.

Names
- Other names nitronium perchlorate, nitroxyl perchlorate, nitryl perchlorate

Identifiers
CAS Number	17495-81-7
3D model (JSmol)	Interactive image
PubChem CID	139089036
- InChI: InChI=1S/ClHO4.NO2/c2-1(3,4)5;2-1-3/h(H,2,3,4,5);/q;+1/p-1 Key: YGZIDGORJKNFDL-UHFFFAOYSA-M
- SMILES: [N+](=O)=O.[O-]Cl(=O)(=O)=O

Properties
Chemical formula	NO_{6}Cl
Molar mass	145.5
Appearance	Colorless monoclinic crystals
Melting point	135 °C (275 °F; 408 K) (decomposition)
Boiling point	decomposition
Solubility in water	decomposes

Hazards
- Occupational safety and health (OHS/OSH)
Main hazards	Explosive, Oxidizing Agent

Related compounds
Other anions	Nitronium tetrafluoroborate
Other cations	Ammonium perchlorate Nitrosyl perchlorate Sodium perchlorate Potassium perchlorate
Related compounds	Nitryl chloride
- Except where otherwise noted, data are given for materials in their standard state (at 25 °C [77 °F], 100 kPa). verify (what is ?) Infobox references

Nitronium perchlorate, NO_{2}ClO_{4}, also known as nitryl perchlorate and nitroxyl perchlorate, is an inorganic chemical, the salt of the perchlorate anion and the nitronium cation. It forms colorless monoclinic crystals. It is hygroscopic, and is a strong oxidizing and nitrating agent. It may become hypergolic in contact with organic materials.

Nitronium perchlorate was investigated as an oxidizer in solid rocket propellants. Thomas N. Scortia filed for patent on such propellant in 1963, however, its reactivity and incompatibility with many materials hindered such use. Coating of nitronium perchlorate particles with ammonium nitrate, prepared in situ by passing of dry ammonia gas over the particles, was investigated, and a patent was awarded.

The decomposition rate of nitronium perchlorate can be altered by doping with multivalent cations.

Nitronium perchlorate and ammonium perchlorate do not produce smoke when stoichiometrically burned with non-metallic fuels. Potassium perchlorate and other metal perchlorates generate smoke, as the metal chlorides are solid materials creating aerosols of their particles. Of all the perchlorates, nitronium perchlorate is the most powerful oxidizer. It can be easily detonated.
