= Transition metal nitrate complex =

Compound of nitrate ligands

Structure of the metal nitrate complex [Rh(NO_{3})_{5}]^{2-}.

In the area of inorganic chemistry, a transition metal nitrate complex is a coordination compound containing one or more nitrate ligands. Such transition metal nitrates are common starting reagents for the preparation of other compounds. Some are intermediates in the extraction of metals from their ores.

== Ligand properties ==
Nitrate is isostructural with but less basic than carbonate. Both nitrate and carbonate exhibit comparable coordination geometries. The nitrogen center of nitrate does not form bonds to metals. Being the conjugate base of a strong acid (nitric acid, pK_{a} = -1.4), nitrate has modest Lewis basicity. Two coordination modes are common: unidentate and bidentate. Unidentate nitrate is classified as X ligand in the Covalent bond classification method. With respect to HSAB theory, it is classified as hard.

When bonded as a bidentate ligand, it is denoted κ^{2}-NO_{3}. Bidentate nitrate is classified as X-L ligand in the Covalent bond classification method. With respect to HSAB theory, it is classified as hard.

In some cases where it is bidentate, nitrate is bound unsymmetrically in the sense that one M-O distance is clearly bonding and the other is more weakly interacting. The MO-N distances for the coordinated oxygen are about 10 picometers longer than the N-O_{terminal} bonds. This observation suggests that the terminal N-O bonds have double bond character.

With three terminal O atoms, nitrate can in principle bind metals through many geometries. Even though the ligand is written as MNO_{3}, it only binds metals through oxygen atoms. Thus, monodentate nitrate is illustrated by [Co(NH_{3})_{5}NO_{3}]^{2+}, equivalently written as [Co(NH_{3})_{5}ONO_{2}]^{2+}. Homoleptic metal nitrate complexes generally have O,O'-bidentate nitrate ligands.

== Coordination complexes ==
Most commonly encountered are the hydrates of transition metal nitrates. The anhydrous derivatives, especially those that are molecular, are simpler to describe and fewer in number.

Homoleptic metal nitrates and related compounds
Formula	name	comment
Ti(NO_{3})_{4}	titanium(IV) nitrate	eight-coordinate, volatile
Co(NO_{3})_{3}	cobalt(III) nitrate	octahedral, volatile
Cu(NO_{3})_{2}	copper(II) nitrate	planar, volatile
AgNO_{3}	silver nitrate	coordination polymer

=== Hydrates ===
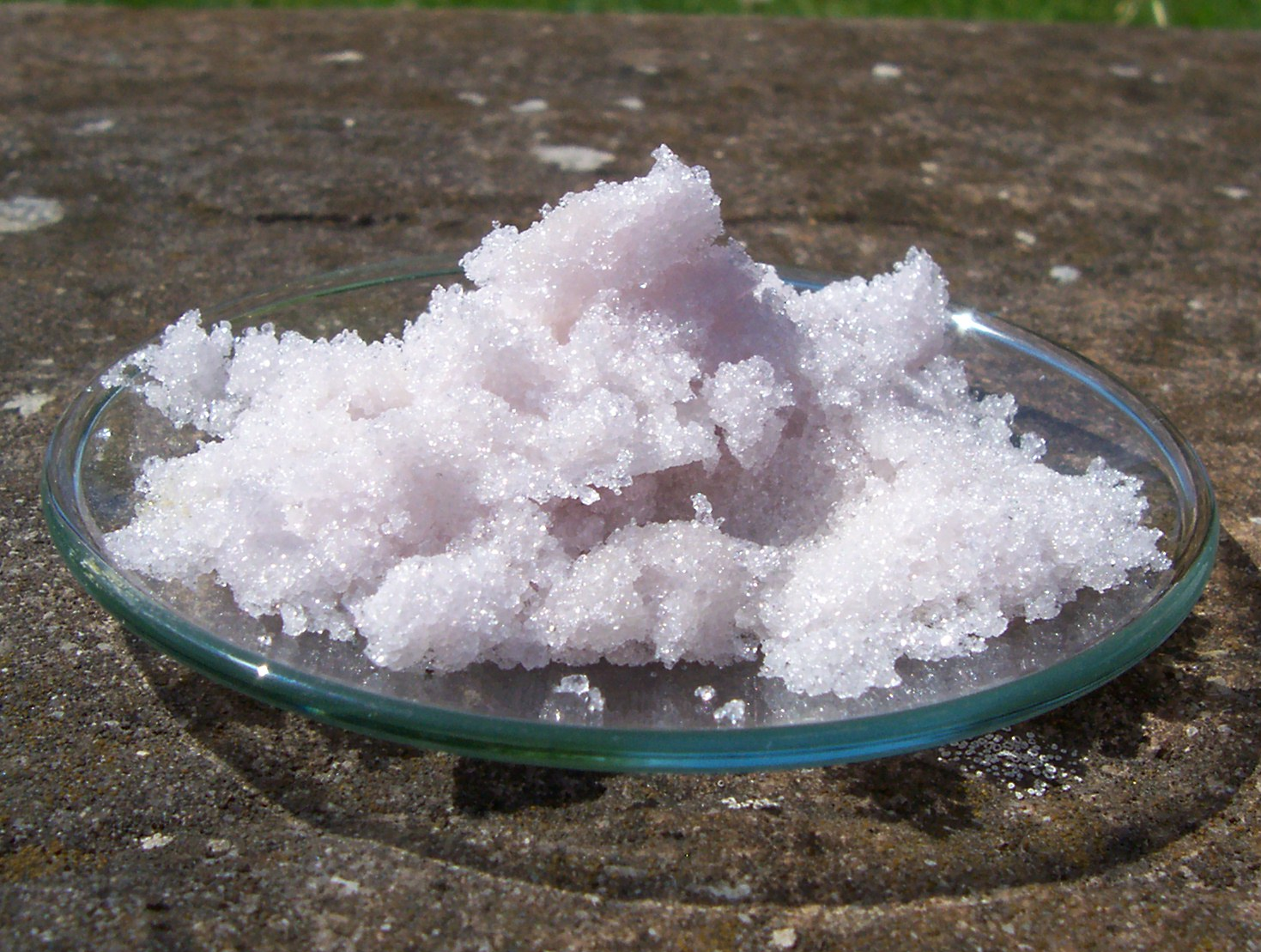
sample of ferric nitrate nonahydrate, which features the [Fe(H_{2}O)_{6}]^{3+} ion

Typical metal nitrates are hydrated. Some of these salts crystallize with one or more nitrate ligands, but most dissolve in water to give aquo complexes, often of the stoichiometry [M(H_{2}O)_{6}]^{n+}.

Some common hydrated metal nitrates
Formula	Color	Structure of metal center	Comment
Cr(NO_{3})_{3}(H_{2}O)_{6}	violet	octahedral	
Mn(NO_{3})_{2}(H_{2}O)_{4}	pale pink	octahedral	two unidentate nitrates in solid state
Fe(NO_{3})_{3}(H_{2}O)_{9}	pale violet	octahedral	
Co(NO_{3})_{2}(H_{2}O)_{2}	red	octahedral	tetra- and hexahydrates also known
Ni(NO_{3})_{2}(H_{2}O)_{4}	green	octahedral	several hydrates are known
Pd(NO_{3})_{2}(H_{2}O)_{2}	pale brown	square planar	
Cu(NO_{3})_{2}(H_{2}O)_{x}	blue	distorted octahedral	multiple hydrates known (x = 1.5, 2.5, 3); Jahn–Teller distorted
Zn(NO_{3})_{2}(H_{2}O)_{4}	colorless	octahedral	
Hg_{2}(NO_{3})_{2}(H_{2}O)_{2}	colorless	linear (Hg–Hg)	contains the Hg_{2}^{2+} dimer

== Synthesis ==
Metal nitrate complexes are often prepared by treating metal oxides or metal carbonates with nitric acid. The main complication with dissolving metals in nitric acid arises from redox reactions, which can afford either nitric oxide or nitrogen dioxide.

Anhydrous nitrates can be prepared by the oxidation of metals with dinitrogen tetroxide (often as a mixture with nitrogen dioxide, with which it interconverts). N_{2}O_{4} undergoes molecular autoionization to give [NO^{+}] [NO_{3}^{−}], with the former nitrosonium ion being a strong oxidant. The method is illustrated by the route to β-Cu(NO_{3})_{2}:

Cu + 2 N_{2}O_{4} → Cu(NO_{3})_{2} + 2 NO

Many metals, metal halides, and metal carbonyls undergo similar reactions, but the product formulas can be deceptive. For example from chromium one obtains Cr(NO_{3})_{3}(N_{2}O_{4})_{2}, which was shown to be the salt (NO^{+})_{2}[Cr(NO_{3})_{5}]^{2-}. The redox reaction of nitrosonium and the metal can give rise to metal nitrosyl complexes. In some cases nitronium ions (NO_{2}^{+}) are observed.

In some cases, nitrate complexes are produced from the reaction of nitrogen dioxide with a metal dioxygen complex:

Pt(O_{2})(PPh_{3})_{2} + NO_{2} → Pt(NO_{3})_{2}(PPh_{3})_{2} (PPh_{3} = triphenylphosphine)

== Reactions ==
Given nitrate's low basicity, the tendency of metal nitrate complexes toward hydrolysis is expected. Thus copper(II) nitrate readily dissociates in aqueous solution to give the aqua complex:

Cu(NO_{3})_{2} + 6 H_{2}O → [Cu(H_{2}O)_{6}](NO_{3})_{2}

Pyrolysis of metal nitrates yields oxides.

Ni(NO_{3})_{2} → NiO + 2 NO_{2} + 0.5 O_{2}

This kind of reaction has been used to incorporate metal oxides into various catalytic supports.

Nitrate reductase enzymes convert nitrate to nitrite. The mechanism involves the intermediacy of Mo-ONO_{2} complexes.
