= Water of crystallization =

Water molecules present inside crystals

In chemistry, water(s) of crystallization or water(s) of hydration are water molecules that are present inside crystals. Water is often incorporated in the formation of crystals from aqueous solutions. In some contexts, water of crystallization is the total mass of water in a substance at a given temperature and is mostly present in a definite (stoichiometric) ratio. Classically, "water of crystallization" refers to water that is found in the crystalline framework of a metal complex or a salt, which is not directly bonded to the metal cation.

Upon crystallization from water, or water-containing solvents, many compounds incorporate water molecules in their crystalline frameworks. Water of crystallization can generally be removed by heating a sample but the crystalline properties are often lost.

Compared to inorganic salts, proteins crystallize with large amounts of water in the crystal lattice. A water content of 50% is not uncommon for proteins.

== Applications ==
Knowledge of hydration is essential for calculating the masses for many compounds. The reactivity of many salt-like solids is sensitive to the presence of water. The hydration and dehydration of salts is central to the use of phase-change materials for energy storage.

== Position in the crystal structure ==
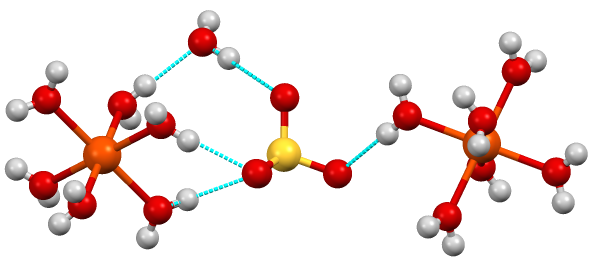
Some hydrogen-bonding contacts in FeSO_{4}·7H_{2}O. This metal aquo complex crystallizes with water of hydration, which interacts with the sulfate and with the [Fe(H_{2}O)_{6}]^{2+} centers.

A salt with associated water of crystallization is known as a hydrate. The structure of hydrates can be quite elaborate, because of the existence of hydrogen bonds that define polymeric structures. Historically, the structures of many hydrates were unknown, and the dot in the formula of a hydrate was employed to specify the composition without indicating how the water is bound. Per IUPAC's recommendations, the middle dot is not surrounded by spaces when indicating a chemical adduct. Examples:

- CuSO_{4}·5H_{2}O – copper(II) sulfate pentahydrate
- CoCl_{2}·6H_{2}O – cobalt(II) chloride hexahydrate
- SnCl_{2}·2H_{2}O – tin(II) (or stannous) chloride dihydrate

For many salts, the exact bonding of the water is unimportant because the water molecules are made labile upon dissolution. For example, an aqueous solution prepared from CuSO_{4}·5H_{2}O and anhydrous CuSO_{4} behave identically. Therefore, knowledge of the degree of hydration is important only for determining the equivalent weight: one mole of CuSO_{4}·5H_{2}O weighs more than one mole of CuSO_{4}. In some cases, the degree of hydration can be critical to the resulting chemical properties. For example, anhydrous RhCl_{3} is not soluble in water and is relatively useless in organometallic chemistry whereas RhCl_{3}·3H_{2}O is versatile. Similarly, hydrated AlCl_{3} is a poor Lewis acid and thus inactive as a catalyst for Friedel-Crafts reactions. Samples of AlCl_{3} must therefore be protected from atmospheric moisture to preclude the formation of hydrates.

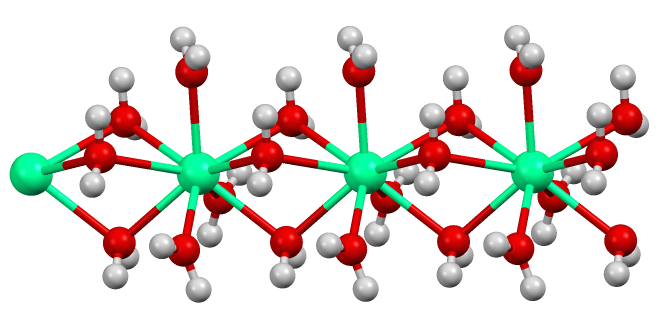
Structure of the polymeric [Ca(H_{2}O)_{6}]^{2+} center in crystalline calcium chloride hexahydrate. Three water ligands are terminal, three bridge. Two aspects of metal aquo complexes are illustrated: the high coordination number typical for Ca^{2+} and the role of water as a bridging ligand.

Crystals of hydrated copper(II) sulfate consist of [Cu(H_{2}O)_{4}]^{2+} centers linked to SO_{4}^{2−} ions. Copper is surrounded by six oxygen atoms, provided by two different sulfate groups and four molecules of water. A fifth water resides elsewhere in the framework but does not bind directly to copper. The cobalt chloride mentioned above occurs as [Co(H_{2}O)_{6}]^{2+} and Cl^{−}. In tin chloride, each Sn(II) center is pyramidal (mean O/Cl−Sn−O/Cl angle is 83°) being bound to two chloride ions and one water. The second water in the formula unit is hydrogen-bonded to the chloride and to the coordinated water molecule. Water of crystallization is stabilized by electrostatic attractions, consequently hydrates are common for salts that contain +2 and +3 cations as well as −2 anions. In some cases, the majority of the weight of a compound arises from water. Glauber's salt, Na_{2}SO_{4}(H_{2}O)_{10}, is a white crystalline solid with greater than 50% water by weight.

Consider the case of nickel(II) chloride hexahydrate. This species has the formula NiCl_{2}(H_{2}O)_{6}. Crystallographic analysis reveals that the solid consists of [trans-NiCl_{2}(H_{2}O)_{4}] subunits that are hydrogen bonded to each other as well as two additional molecules of H_{2}O. Thus one third of the water molecules in the crystal are not directly bonded to Ni^{2+}, and these might be termed "water of crystallization".

== Analysis ==
The water content of most compounds can be determined with a knowledge of its formula. An unknown sample can be determined through thermogravimetric analysis (TGA) where the sample is heated strongly, and the accurate weight of a sample is plotted against the temperature. The amount of water driven off is then divided by the molar mass of water to obtain the number of molecules of water bound to the salt.

== Other solvents of crystallization ==
Water is a particularly common solvent to be found in crystals because it is small and polar. But many other solvents can be hosted in crystals, known as solvates. Water is noteworthy because it is reactive, whereas other solvents such as benzene are considered to be chemically innocuous. Occasionally more than one solvent is found in a crystal, and often the stoichiometry is variable, reflected in the crystallographic concept of "partial occupancy". It is common and conventional for a chemist to "dry" a sample with a combination of vacuum and heat "to constant weight".

For other solvents of crystallization, analysis is conveniently accomplished by dissolving the sample in a deuterated solvent and analyzing the sample for solvent signals by NMR spectroscopy. Single crystal X-ray crystallography is often able to detect the presence of these solvents of crystallization as well. Other methods may be currently available.

== Table of crystallization water in some inorganic halides ==
In the table below are indicated the numbers of molecules of water per metal in various salts. The halides and water compete for coordination sites.

Hydrated metal halides and their formulas	Coordination sphere of the metal	Equivalents of water of crystallization that are not bound to M	Remarks
Calcium chloride CaCl_{2}(H_{2}O)_{6}	[Ca(μ-H_{2}O)_{6}(H_{2}O)_{3}]^{2+}	none	example of water as a bridging ligand
Calcium bromide CaBr_{2}(H_{2}O)_{9}	[Ca(H_{2}O)_{8}]^{2+}	1	the most hydrated calcium halide
Calcium iodide CaI_{2}(H_{2}O)_{7}	[Ca(H_{2}O)_{8}]^{2+}	none	bridging water ligands
Calcium iodide CaI_{2}(H_{2}O)_{8}	[Ca(H_{2}O)_{8}]^{2+}	1	bridging water ligands
Calcium iodide CaI_{2}(H_{2}O)_{6.5}	[Ca(H_{2}O)_{8}]^{2+}	none	bridging water ligands
Scandium(III) chloride ScCl_{3}(H_{2}O)_{6}	trans-[ScCl_{2}(H_{2}O)_{4}]^{+}	2	Similar to VCl_{3}(H_{2}O)_{6}
Scandium(III) chloride ScCl_{3}(H_{2}O)_{7}	[Sc(H_{2}O)_{7}]^{3+}	0	7-coordinate
Scandium(III) bromide ScBr_{3}(H_{2}O)_{7}	[Sc(H_{2}O)_{7}]^{3+}	0	isomorphous with the trichloride
Scandium(III) iodide ScI_{3}(H_{2}O)_{8}	[Sc(H_{2}O)_{7}]^{3+}	1	unique
Titanium(III) chloride TiCl_{3}(H_{2}O)_{6}	trans-[TiCl_{2}(H_{2}O)_{4}]^{+}	2	isomorphous with VCl_{3}(H_{2}O)_{6}
Titanium(III) chloride TiCl_{3}(H_{2}O)_{6}	[Ti(H_{2}O)_{6}]^{3+}	none	isomeric with [TiCl_{2}(H_{2}O)_{4}]Cl·2H_{2}O
Zirconium(IV) fluoride ZrF_{4}(H_{2}O)_{3}	(μ−F)_{2}[ZrF_{3}(H_{2}O)_{3}]_{2}	none	rare case where Hf and Zr differ
Hafnium tetrafluoride HfF_{4}(H_{2}O)_{3}	(μ−F)_{2}[HfF_{2}(H_{2}O)_{2}]_{n}(H_{2}O)_{n}	1	rare case where Hf and Zr differ
Vanadium(III) chloride VCl_{3}(H_{2}O)_{6}	trans-[VCl_{2}(H_{2}O)_{4}]^{+}	2	
Vanadium(III) bromide VBr_{3}(H_{2}O)_{6}	trans-[VBr_{2}(H_{2}O)_{4}]^{+}	2	
Vanadium(III) iodide VI_{3}(H_{2}O)_{6}	[V(H_{2}O)_{6}]^{3+}	none	relative to Cl^{−} and Br^{−}, I^{−} competes poorly with water as a ligand for V(III)
Nb_{6}Cl_{14}(H_{2}O)_{8}	[Nb_{6}Cl_{14}(H_{2}O)_{2}]	4	
Chromium(III) chloride CrCl_{3}(H_{2}O)_{6}	trans-[CrCl_{2}(H_{2}O)_{4}]^{+}	2	dark green isomer, aka "Bjerrums's salt"
Chromium(III) chloride CrCl_{3}(H_{2}O)_{6}	[CrCl(H_{2}O)_{5}]^{2+}	1	blue-green isomer
Chromium(II) chloride CrCl_{2}(H_{2}O)_{4}	trans-[CrCl_{2}(H_{2}O)_{4}]	none	square planar/tetragonal distortion
Chromium(III) chloride CrCl_{3}(H_{2}O)_{6}	[Cr(H_{2}O)_{6}]^{3+}	none	violet isomer. isostructural with aluminium compound
Manganese(II) chloride MnCl_{2}(H_{2}O)_{6}	trans-[MnCl_{2}(H_{2}O)_{4}]	2	
Manganese(II) chloride MnCl_{2}(H_{2}O)_{4}	cis-[MnCl_{2}(H_{2}O)_{4}]	none	cis molecular, the unstable trans isomer has also been detected
Manganese(II) bromide MnBr_{2}(H_{2}O)_{4}	cis-[MnBr_{2}(H_{2}O)_{4}]	none	cis, molecular
Manganese(II) iodide MnI_{2}(H_{2}O)_{4}	trans-[MnI_{2}(H_{2}O)_{4}]	none	molecular, isostructural with FeCl_{2}(H_{2}O)_{4}.
Manganese(II) chloride MnCl_{2}(H_{2}O)_{2}	trans-[MnCl_{4}(H_{2}O)_{2}]^{2−}	none	polymeric with bridging chloride
Manganese(II) bromide MnBr_{2}(H_{2}O)_{2}	trans-[MnBr_{4}(H_{2}O)_{2}]^{2−}	none	polymeric with bridging bromide
Rhenium(III) chloride Re_{3}Cl_{9}(H_{2}O)_{4}	triangulo-[Re_{3}Cl_{9}(H_{2}O)_{3}]	none	heavy early metals form M-M bonds
Iron(II) chloride FeCl_{2}(H_{2}O)_{6}	trans-[FeCl_{2}(H_{2}O)_{4}]	two	
Iron(II) chloride FeCl_{2}(H_{2}O)_{4}	trans-[FeCl_{2}(H_{2}O)_{4}]	none	molecular
Iron(II) bromide FeBr_{2}(H_{2}O)_{4}	trans-[FeBr_{2}(H_{2}O)_{4}]	none	molecular, hydrates of FeI2 are not known
Iron(II) chloride FeCl_{2}(H_{2}O)_{2}	trans-[FeCl_{4}(H_{2}O)_{2}]	none	polymeric with bridging chloride
Iron(III) chloride FeCl_{3}(H_{2}O)_{6}	trans-[FeCl_{2}(H_{2}O)_{4}]^{+}	two	one of four hydrates of ferric chloride, isostructural with Cr analogue
Iron(III) chloride FeCl_{3}(H_{2}O)_{2.5}	cis-[FeCl_{2}(H_{2}O)_{4}]^{+}	two	the dihydrate has a similar structure, both contain FeCl^{−}_{4} anions.
Cobalt(II) chloride CoCl_{2}(H_{2}O)_{6}	trans-[CoCl_{2}(H_{2}O)_{4}]	two	
Cobalt(II) bromide CoBr_{2}(H_{2}O)_{6}	trans-[CoBr_{2}(H_{2}O)_{4}]	two	
Cobalt(II) iodide CoI_{2}(H_{2}O)_{6}	[Co(H_{2}O)_{6}]^{2+}	none	iodide competes poorly with water
Cobalt(II) bromide CoBr_{2}(H_{2}O)_{4}	trans-[CoBr_{2}(H_{2}O)_{4}]	none	molecular
Cobalt(II) chloride CoCl_{2}(H_{2}O)_{4}	cis-[CoCl_{2}(H_{2}O)_{4}]	none	note: cis molecular
Cobalt(II) chloride CoCl_{2}(H_{2}O)_{2}	trans-[CoCl_{4}(H_{2}O)_{2}]	none	polymeric with bridging chloride
Cobalt(II) bromide CoBr_{2}(H_{2}O)_{2}	trans-[CoBr_{4}(H_{2}O)_{2}]	none	polymeric with bridging bromide
Nickel(II) chloride NiCl_{2}(H_{2}O)_{6}	trans-[NiCl_{2}(H_{2}O)_{4}]	two	
Nickel(II) chloride NiCl_{2}(H_{2}O)_{4}	cis-[NiCl_{2}(H_{2}O)_{4}]	none	note: cis molecular
Nickel(II) bromide NiBr_{2}(H_{2}O)_{6}	trans-[NiBr_{2}(H_{2}O)_{4}]	two	
Nickel(II) iodide NiI_{2}(H_{2}O)_{6}	[Ni(H_{2}O)_{6}]^{2+}	none	iodide competes poorly with water
Nickel(II) chloride NiCl_{2}(H_{2}O)_{2}	trans-[NiCl_{4}(H_{2}O)_{2}]	none	polymeric with bridging chloride
Platinum(IV) chloride [Pt(H_{2}O)_{2}Cl_{4}](H_{2}O)_{3}	trans-[PtCl_{4}(H_{2}O)_{2}]	3	octahedral Pt centers; rare example of non-first row chloride-aquo complex
Platinum(IV) chloride [Pt(H_{2}O)_{3}Cl_{3}]Cl(H_{2}O)_{0.5}	fac-[PtCl_{3}(H_{2}O)_{3}]^{+}	0.5	octahedral Pt centers; rare example of non-first row chloride-aquo complex
Copper(II) chloride CuCl_{2}(H_{2}O)_{2}	[CuCl_{4}(H_{2}O)_{2}]_{2}	none	tetragonally distorted two long Cu-Cl distances
Copper(II) bromide CuBr_{2}(H_{2}O)_{4}	[CuBr_{4}(H_{2}O)_{2}]_{n}	two	tetragonally distorted two long Cu-Br distances
Zinc(II) chloride ZnCl_{2}(H_{2}O)_{1.33}	2 ZnCl_{2} + ZnCl_{2}(H_{2}O)_{4}	none	coordination polymer with both tetrahedral and octahedral Zn centers
Zinc(II) chloride ZnCl_{2}(H_{2}O)_{2.5}	Cl_{3}Zn(μ-Cl)Zn(H_{2}O)_{5}	none	tetrahedral and octahedral Zn centers
Zinc(II) chloride ZnCl_{2}(H_{2}O)_{3}	[ZnCl_{4}]^{2−} & [Zn(H_{2}O)_{6}]^{2+}	none	tetrahedral and octahedral Zn centers
Zinc(II) chloride ZnCl_{2}(H_{2}O)_{4.5}	[ZnCl_{4}]^{2−} & [Zn(H_{2}O)_{6}]^{2+}	three	tetrahedral and octahedral Zn centers
Cadmium chloride CdCl_{2}·H_{2}O		none	water of crystallization is rare for heavy metal halides
Cadmium chloride CdCl_{2}·2.5H_{2}O	CdCl_{5}(H_{2}O) & CdCl_{4}(H_{2}O)_{2}	none	
Cadmium chloride CdCl_{2}·4H_{2}O	CdCl_{4}(H_{2}O)_{4}	two	octahedral, doubly bridging chlorides
Cadmium bromide CdBr_{2}(H_{2}O)_{4}	[CdBr_{4}(H_{2}O)_{2}	two	octahedral Cd centers
Aluminum trichloride AlCl_{3}(H_{2}O)_{6}	[Al(H_{2}O)_{6}]^{3+}	none	isostructural with the Cr(III) compound
Aluminum triiodide AlI_{3}(H_{2}O)_{6}	[Al(H_{2}O)_{6}]^{3+}	none	other hydrates are known
Aluminum triiodide AlI_{3}(H_{2}O)_{15}	[Al(H_{2}O)_{6}]^{3+}	9	other hydrates are known
Aluminum triiodide AlI_{3}(H_{2}O)_{17}	[Al(H_{2}O)_{6}]^{3+}	11	the highest hydrate crystallized

== Hydrates of metal sulfates ==
Transition metal sulfates form a variety of hydrates. Many occur in nature, some being the result of weathering of mineral sulfides. Sulfates are less hydrated than nitrates and halides. Several monohydrates are known.

Formula of hydrated metal ion sulfate	Coordination sphere of the metal ion	Equivalents of water of crystallization that are not bound to M	mineral name	Remarks
MgSO_{4}(H_{2}O)	[Mg(μ-H_{2}O)(μ_{4}-,-κ^{1}-SO_{4})_{4}]	none	kieserite	see Mn, Fe, Co, Ni, Zn analogues
MgSO_{4}(H_{2}O)_{4}	[Mg(H_{2}O)_{4}(κ′,κ^{1}-SO_{4})]_{4}	none		sulfate is bridging ligand, 8-membered Mg_{2}O_{4}S_{2} rings
MgSO_{4}(H_{2}O)_{6}	[Mg(H_{2}O)_{6}]^{2+}	none	hexahydrate	common motif
MgSO_{4}(H_{2}O)_{7}	[Mg(H_{2}O)_{6}]^{2+}	one	epsomite	common motif
TiOSO_{4}(H_{2}O)	[Ti(μ-O)_{2}(H_{2}O)(κ^{1}-SO_{4})_{3}]	none		further hydration gives gels
VSO_{4}(H_{2}O)_{6}	[V(H_{2}O)_{6}]^{2+}	none		Adopts the hexahydrite motif
VSO_{4}(H_{2}O)_{7}	[V(H_{2}O)_{6}]^{2+}	one		hexaaquo
VOSO_{4}(H_{2}O)_{5}	[VO(H_{2}O)_{4}(κ^{1}-SO_{4})_{4}]	one		
CrSO_{4}(H_{2}O)_{3}	[Cr(H_{2}O)_{3}(κ^{1}-SO_{4})]	none		resembles CuSO_{4}(H_{2}O)_{3}
CrSO_{4}(H_{2}O)_{5}	[Cr(H_{2}O)_{4}(κ^{1}-SO_{4})_{2}]	one		resembles CuSO_{4}(H_{2}O)_{5}
Cr_{2}(SO_{4})_{3}(H_{2}O)_{18}	[Cr(H_{2}O)_{6}]^{3+}	six		One of several chromium(III) sulfates
MnSO_{4}(H_{2}O)	[Mn(μ-H_{2}O)(μ_{4}-,-κ^{1}-SO_{4})_{4}]	none	szmikite	see Fe, Co, Ni, Zn analogues
MnSO_{4}(H_{2}O)_{4}	[Mn(μ-SO_{4})_{2}(H_{2}O)_{4}]	none	Ilesitepentahydrate is called jôkokuite; the hexahydrate, the most rare, is called chvaleticeite	with 8-membered ring Mn_{2}(SO_{4})_{2} core
MnSO_{4}(H_{2}O)_{5}		?	jôkokuite	
MnSO_{4}(H_{2}O)_{6}		?	Chvaleticeite	
MnSO_{4}(H_{2}O)_{7}	[Mn(H_{2}O)_{6}]^{2+}	one	mallardite	see Mg analogue
FeSO_{4}(H_{2}O)	[Fe(μ-H_{2}O)(μ_{4}-,-κ^{1}-SO_{4})_{4}]	none		see Mn, Co, Ni, Zn analogues
FeSO_{4}(H_{2}O)_{7}	[Fe(H_{2}O)_{6}]^{2+}	one	melanterite	see Mg analogue
FeSO_{4}(H_{2}O)_{4}	[Fe(H_{2}O)_{4}(κ′,κ^{1}-SO_{4})]_{2}	none		sulfate is bridging ligand, 8-membered Fe_{2}O_{4}S_{2} rings
Fe^{II}Fe^{III}_{2}(SO_{4})_{4}(H_{2}O)_{14}	[Fe^{II}(H_{2}O)_{6}]^{2+}[Fe^{III}(H_{2}O)_{4}(κ^{1}-SO_{4})_{2}]_{2}	none		sulfates are terminal ligands on Fe(III)
CoSO_{4}(H_{2}O)	[Co(μ-H_{2}O)(μ_{4}-,-κ^{1}-SO_{4})_{4}]	none		see Mn, Fe, Ni, Zn analogues
CoSO_{4}(H_{2}O)_{6}	[Co(H_{2}O)_{6}]^{2+}	none	moorhouseite	see Mg analogue
CoSO_{4}(H_{2}O)_{7}	[Co(H_{2}O)_{6}]^{2+}	one	bieberite	see Fe, Mg analogues
NiSO_{4}(H_{2}O)	[Ni(μ-H_{2}O)(μ_{4}-,-κ^{1}-SO_{4})_{4}]	none		see Mn, Fe, Co, Zn analogues
NiSO_{4}(H_{2}O)_{6}	[Ni(H_{2}O)_{6}]^{2+}	none	retgersite	One of several nickel sulfate hydrates
NiSO_{4}(H_{2}O)_{7}	[Ni(H_{2}O)_{6}]^{2+}		morenosite	
PdSO_{4}(H_{2}O)_{2}	[Pd(SO_{4})(H_{2}O)_{2}]	none		
(NH_{4})_{2}Pt_{2}(SO_{4})_{4}(H_{2}O)_{2}	Pt_{2}(SO_{4})_{4}(H_{2}O)_{2}^{2−}	none		Pt-Pt bonded Chinese lantern structure
CuSO_{4}(H_{2}O)_{5}	[Cu(H_{2}O)_{4}(κ^{1}-SO_{4})_{2}]	one	chalcantite	sulfate is bridging ligand
CuSO_{4}(H_{2}O)_{7}	[Cu(H_{2}O)_{6}]^{2+}	one	boothite	
ZnSO_{4}(H_{2}O)	[Zn(μ-H_{2}O)(μ_{4}-,-κ^{1}-SO_{4})_{4}]	none		see Mn, Fe, Co, Ni analogues
ZnSO_{4}(H_{2}O)_{4}	[Zn(H_{2}O)_{4}(κ′,κ^{1}-SO_{4})]_{2}	none		sulfate is bridging ligand, 8-membered Zn_{2}O_{4}S_{2} rings
ZnSO_{4}(H_{2}O)_{6}	[Zn(H_{2}O)_{6}]^{2+}	none		see Mg analogue
ZnSO_{4}(H_{2}O)_{7}	[Zn(H_{2}O)_{6}]^{2+}	one	goslarite	see Mg analogue
CdSO_{4}(H_{2}O)	[Cd(μ-H_{2}O)_{2}(κ^{1}-SO_{4})_{4}]	none		bridging water ligand

== Hydrates of metal nitrates ==
Transition metal nitrates form a variety of hydrates. The nitrate anion often binds to the metal, especially for those salts with fewer than six aquo ligands. Nitrates are uncommon in nature, so few minerals are represented here. Hydrated ferrous nitrate has not been characterized crystallographically.

Formula of hydrated metal ion nitrate	Coordination sphere of the metal ion	Equivalents of water of crystallization that are not bound to M	Remarks
Cr(NO_{3})_{3}(H_{2}O)_{9}	[Cr(H_{2}O)_{6}]^{3+}	three	octahedral configuration isostructural with Fe(NO_{3})_{3}(H_{2}O)_{9}
Mn(NO_{3})_{2}(H_{2}O)_{4}	cis-[Mn(H_{2}O)_{4}(κ^{1}-ONO_{2})_{2}]	none	octahedral configuration
Mn(NO_{3})_{2}(H_{2}O)	[Mn(H_{2}O)(μ-ONO_{2})_{5}]	none	octahedral configuration
Mn(NO_{3})_{2}(H_{2}O)_{6}	[Mn(H_{2}O)_{6}]^{2+}	none	octahedral configuration isomorphous with Zn analogue
Fe(NO_{3})_{3}(H_{2}O)_{9}	[Fe(H_{2}O)_{6}]^{3+}	three	octahedral configuration isostructural with Cr(NO_{3})_{3}(H_{2}O)_{9}
Fe(NO_{3})_{3}(H_{2}O)_{4}	[Fe(H_{2}O)_{3}(κ^{2}-O_{2}NO)_{2}]^{+}	one	pentagonal bipyramid
Fe(NO_{3})_{3}(H_{2}O)_{5}	[Fe(H_{2}O)_{5}(κ^{1}-ONO_{2})]^{2+}	none	octahedral configuration
Fe(NO_{3})_{3}(H_{2}O)_{6}	[Fe(H_{2}O)_{6}]^{3+}	none	octahedral configuration
Co(NO_{3})_{2}(H_{2}O)_{2}	[Co(H_{2}O)_{2}(κ^{1}-ONO_{2})_{2}]	none	octahedral configuration
Co(NO_{3})_{2}(H_{2}O)_{4}	[Co(H_{2}O)_{4}(κ^{1}-ONO_{2})_{2}	none	octahedral configuration
Co(NO_{3})_{2}(H_{2}O)_{6}	[Co(H_{2}O)_{6}]^{2+}	none	octahedral configuration.
α-Ni(NO_{3})_{2}(H_{2}O)_{4}	cis-[Ni(H_{2}O)_{4}(κ^{1}-ONO_{2})_{2}]	none	octahedral configuration.
β-Ni(NO_{3})_{2}(H_{2}O)_{4}	trans-[Ni(H_{2}O)_{4}(κ^{1}-ONO_{2})_{2}]	none	octahedral configuration.
Pd(NO_{3})_{2}(H_{2}O)_{2}	trans-[Pd(H_{2}O)_{2}(κ^{1}-ONO_{2})_{2}]	none	square planar coordination geometry
Cu(NO_{3})_{2}(H_{2}O)	[Cu(H_{2}O)(κ^{2}-ONO_{2})_{2}]	none	octahedral configuration.
Cu(NO_{3})_{2}(H_{2}O)_{1.5}	uncertain	uncertain	uncertain
Cu(NO_{3})_{2}(H_{2}O)_{2.5}	[Cu(H_{2}O)_{2}(κ^{1}-ONO_{2})_{2}]	one	square planar
Cu(NO_{3})_{2}(H_{2}O)_{3}	uncertain	uncertain	uncertain
Cu(NO_{3})_{2}(H_{2}O)_{6}	[Cu(H_{2}O)_{6}]^{2+}	none	octahedral configuration
Zn(NO_{3})_{2}(H_{2}O)_{4}	cis-[Zn(H_{2}O)_{4}(κ^{1}-ONO_{2})_{2}]	none	octahedral configuration.
Zn(NO_{3})_{2}(H_{2}O)_{6}	[Zn(H_{2}O)_{6}]^{2+}	none	octahedral configuration isomorphous with Mn analogue
Hg_{2}(NO_{3})_{2}(H_{2}O)_{2}	[H_{2}O-Hg-Hg-OH_{2}]^{2+}	linear	Hydrates of Hg(NO_{3})_{2} have not been crystallized

== Gallery ==
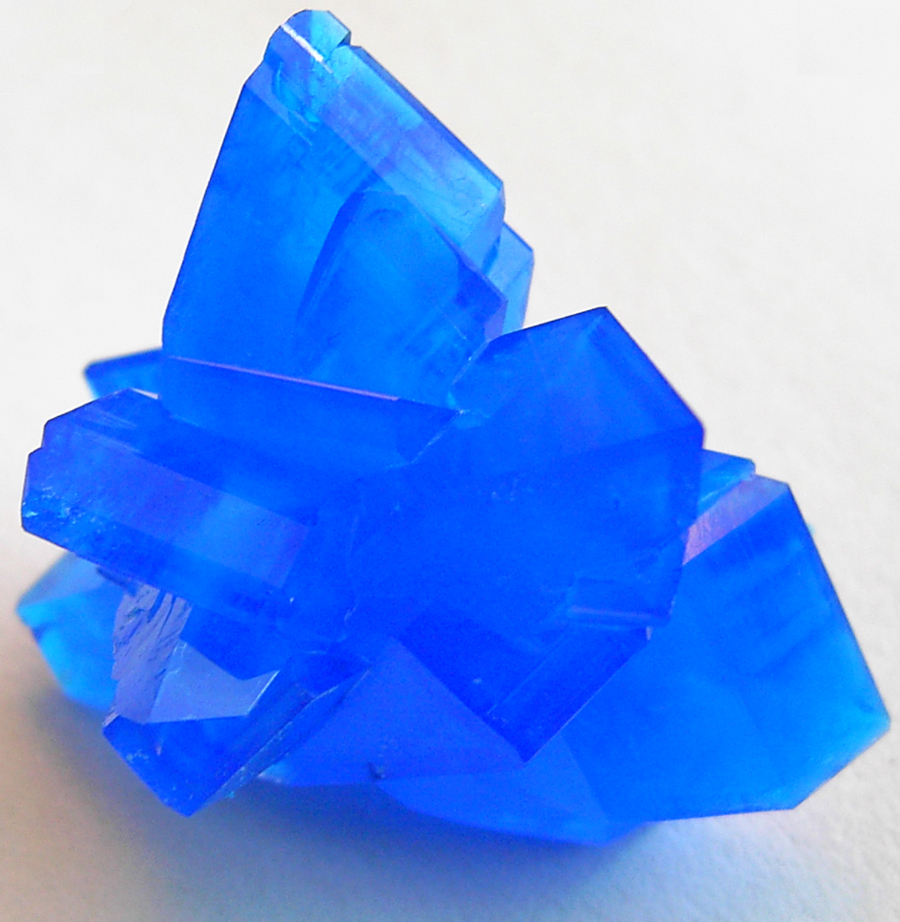
Hydrated copper(II) sulfate is bright blue.

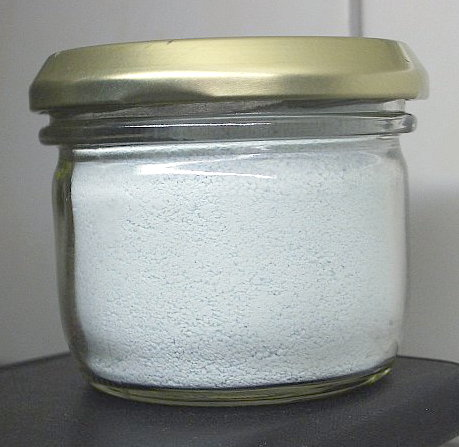
Anhydrous copper(II) sulfate has a light turquoise tint.

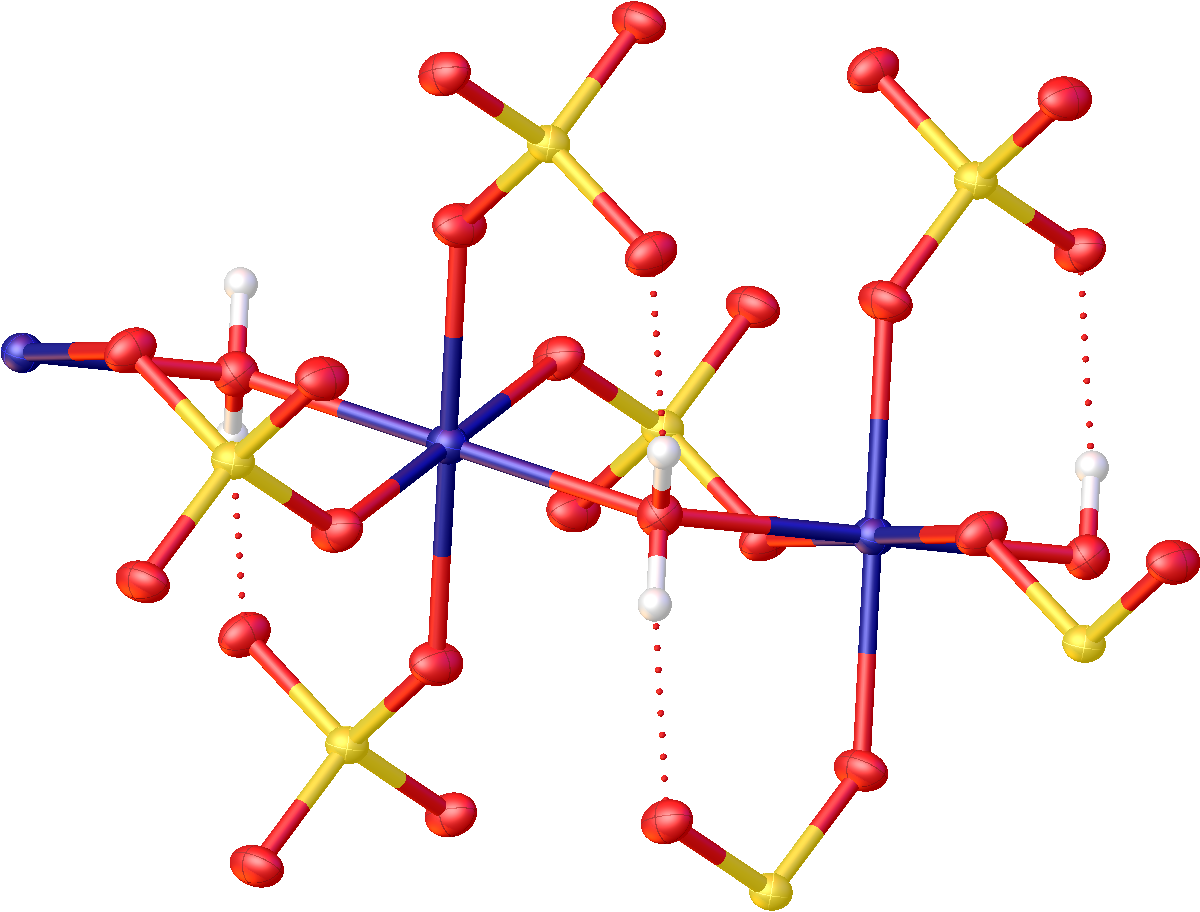
Substructure of MSO_{4}(H_{2}O), illustrating presence of bridging water and bridging sulfate (M = Mg, Mn, Fe, Co, Ni, Zn)

== See also ==
- Hydrate
- Mineral hydration
- Hydrous oxide
- outline of water
