= Manganese laurate =

Names
- Other names manganese dodecanoate

Identifiers
CAS Number	21248-70-4
3D model (JSmol)	Interactive image
ChemSpider	15626172
EC Number	244-291-4
PubChem CID	12465957
- InChI: InChI=1S/2C12H24O2.Mn/c2*1-2-3-4-5-6-7-8-9-10-11-12(13)14;/h2*2-11H2,1H3,(H,13,14); Key: HSWQKOUKDQSLCY-UHFFFAOYSA-N
- SMILES: CCCCCCCCCCCC(=O)O.CCCCCCCCCCCC(=O)O.[Mn]

Properties
Chemical formula	C_{24}H_{48}MnO_{4}
Molar mass	455.582 g·mol^{−1}
Appearance	pale pink powder
Density	0.376
Melting point	104.95 °C (220.91 °F; 378.10 K)
Solubility in water	Insoluble
Solubility	Soluble in alcohol Slightly soluble in decane
- Except where otherwise noted, data are given for materials in their standard state (at 25 °C [77 °F], 100 kPa). Infobox references

Manganese laurate is a metal-organic compound with the chemical formula C_{24}H_{48}MnO_{4}. The compound is classified as a metallic soap, i.e. a metal derivative of a fatty acid (lauric acid).

== Preparation ==
Manganese laurate can be prepared by reacting sodium laurate with manganese chloride.
