= Chromium(II) oxalate =

Names
- IUPAC name Chromium(2+) oxalate

Identifiers
CAS Number	814-90-4
3D model (JSmol)	Interactive image
ChemSpider	12595
ECHA InfoCard	100.011.282
PubChem CID	13147
UNII	RV83VA978Q
CompTox Dashboard (EPA)	DTXSID90231083
- InChI: InChI=1S/C2H2O4.Cr/c3-1(4)2(5)6;/h(H,3,4)(H,5,6);/q;+2/p-2 Key: XVHFYNOGAFYRJV-UHFFFAOYSA-L; InChI=1/C2H2O4.Cr/c3-1(4)2(5)6;/h(H,3,4)(H,5,6);/q;+2/p-2 Key: XVHFYNOGAFYRJV-NUQVWONBAE
- SMILES: C(=O)(C(=O)[O-])[O-].[Cr+2]

Properties
Chemical formula	Cr(C_{2}O_{4})
Molar mass	140.02 g/mol
Appearance	light green crystals
Density	2.461 g/cm^{3}
Solubility in water	126 g/100 mL (0 °C)
Solubility	negligible in alcohol

Related compounds
Other cations	Iron(II) oxalate
- Except where otherwise noted, data are given for materials in their standard state (at 25 °C [77 °F], 100 kPa). Infobox references

Chromium(II) oxalate is an inorganic compound with the chemical formula CrC_{2}O_{4}. A light green dihydrate exists.

== Structure ==
The measured magnetic moment of 4.65 B.M. suggests that the chromium ion does not form a Cr-Cr bond and has a high-spin octahedral coordination geometry. This would be consistent with the structure of other linear polymeric metal(II) oxalates of general formula MC_{2}O_{4}·2H_{2}O (M = Mg, Fe, etc.).

== Preparation ==
The dihydrate can be prepared from chromium(II) sulfate pentahydrate by reaction with a mixture of sodium oxalate and oxalic acid in degassed aqueous solution, forming a light green crystalline product.

A study found chromium(II) will reduce oxalate to glycolate within a few minutes in acidic aqueous solutions, casting some doubt on the formulation of chromium(II) oxalate as a stable Cr^{2+} species if prepared from acidic aqueous solutions.

== Reactions ==
The dihydrate loses water to form anhydrous CrC_{2}O_{4} when heated above 140 °C in an inert atmosphere. Heating above 320 °C produces a mixture of chromium oxides.
