= Cobalt(II) nitrate =

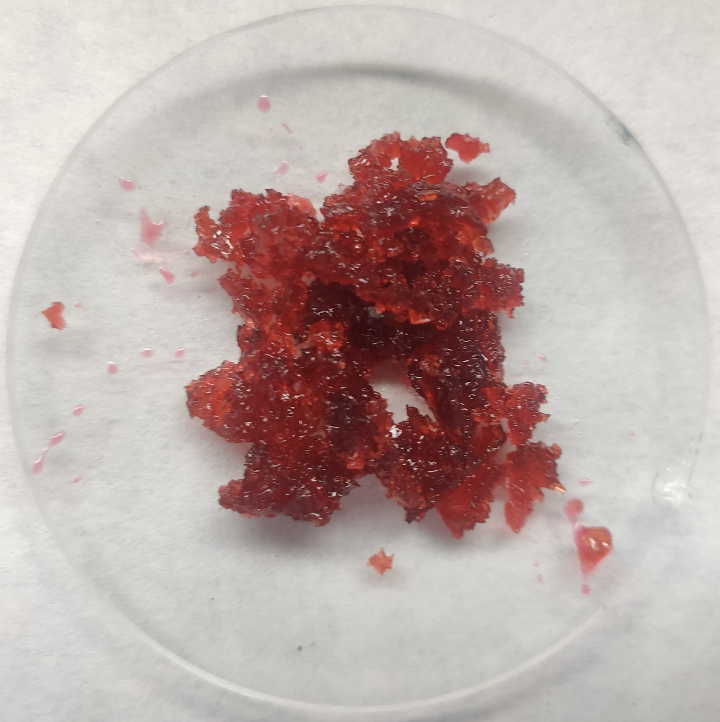
- Cobalt (II) Nitrate Hexahydrate Sample Hexahydrate

Names
- Other names Cobaltous nitrate Nitric acid, cobalt(2+) salt

Identifiers
CAS Number	10026-22-9 hexahydrate; 10141-05-6 anhydrous; 7697-37-2 dihydrate
3D model (JSmol)	Interactive image
ChEBI	CHEBI:86209
ChemSpider	23369
ECHA InfoCard	100.030.353
EC Number	233-402-1
PubChem CID	25000
RTECS number	GG1109000
UNII	65W79BFD5V
UN number	1477
CompTox Dashboard (EPA)	DTXSID9064970
- InChI: InChI=1S/Co.2NO3/c;2*2-1(3)4/q+2;2*-1 Key: UFMZWBIQTDUYBN-UHFFFAOYSA-N; InChI=1/Co.2NO3/c;2*2-1(3)4/q+2;2*-1 Key: UFMZWBIQTDUYBN-UHFFFAOYAS
- SMILES: [Co+2].[O-][N+]([O-])=O.[O-][N+]([O-])=O

Properties
Chemical formula	Co(NO_{3})_{2}·6H_{2}O
Molar mass	291.03 g/mol (hexahydrate); 182.943 g/mol (anhydrous)
Appearance	pale red powder (anhydrous) red crystalline (hexahydrate)
Odor	odorless
Density	1.87 g/cm^{3} (hexahydrate); 2.49 g/cm^{3} (anhydrous)
Melting point	100 °C (212 °F; 373 K) decomposes (anhydrous); 55 °C (hexahydrate)
Boiling point	100 to 105 °C (212 to 221 °F; 373 to 378 K) decomposes (anhydrous); 74 °C, decomposes (hexahydrate)
Solubility in water	anhydrous: 84.03 g/100 mL (0 °C); 334.9 g/100 mL (90 °C) soluble (anhydrous)
Solubility	soluble in alcohol, acetone, ethanol, ammonia (hexahydrate), methanol 2.1 g/100 mL

Structure
Coordination geometry	monoclinic (hexahydrate)

Hazards
- GHS labelling
Pictograms	(GHS07: Exclamation mark) (GHS09: Environmental hazard)
Signal word	Danger
Hazard statements	H317, H334, H341, H350, H360, H410
Precautionary statements	P201, P202, P261, P272, P273, P280, P281, P285, P302+P352, P304+P341, P308+P313, P321, P333+P313, P342+P311, P363, P391, P405, P501
NFPA 704 (fire diamond)	2 0 0 OX
- Lethal dose or concentration (LD, LC)
LD_{50} (median dose)	434 mg/kg; rat, oral (anhydrous); 691 mg/kg; rat, oral (hexahydrate)
Safety data sheet (SDS)	Cobalt (II) Nitrate MSDS

Related compounds
Other anions	Cobalt(II) sulfate Cobalt(II) chloride Cobalt oxalate
Other cations	Iron(III) nitrate Nickel(II) nitrate
- Except where otherwise noted, data are given for materials in their standard state (at 25 °C [77 °F], 100 kPa). verify (what is ?) Infobox references

Cobalt nitrate is the inorganic compound with the formula Co(NO_{3})_{2}·nH_{2}O. It is a cobalt(II) salt. The most common form is the hexahydrate Co(NO_{3})_{2}·6H_{2}O, which is a red-brown deliquescent salt that is soluble in water and other polar solvents.

== Composition and structures ==
As well as the anhydrous compound Co(NO_{3})_{2}, several hydrates of cobalt(II) nitrate exist. These hydrates have the chemical formula Co(NO_{3})_{2}·nH_{2}O, where n = 0, 2, 4, 6.

Anhydrous cobalt(II) nitrate adopts a three-dimensional polymeric network structure, with each cobalt(II) atom approximately octahedrally coordinated by six oxygen atoms, each from a different nitrate ion. Each nitrate ion coordinates to three cobalts. The dihydrate is a two-dimensional polymer, with nitrate bridges between Co(II) centres and hydrogen bonding holding the layers together. The tetrahydrate consists of discrete, octahedral [(H_{2}O)_{4}Co(NO_{3})_{2}] molecules. The hexahydrate is better described as hexaaquacobalt(II) nitrate, [Co(H_{2}O)_{6}][NO_{3}]_{2}, as it consists of discrete [Co(H_{2}O)_{6}]^{2+} and [NO_{3}]^{−} ions. Above 55 °C, the hexahydrate converts to the trihydrate and at higher temperatures to the monohydrate.

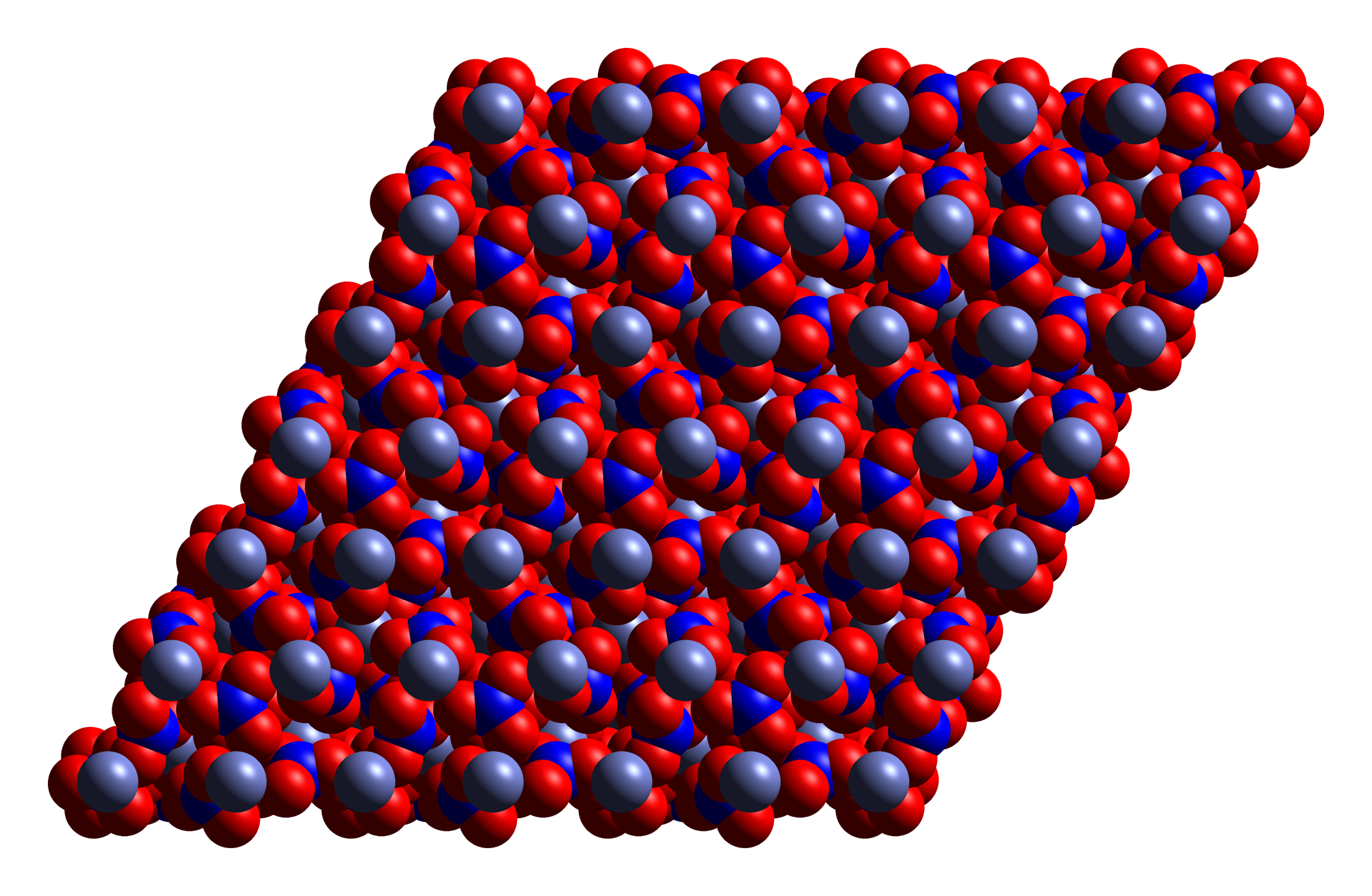
Co(NO_{3})_{2}

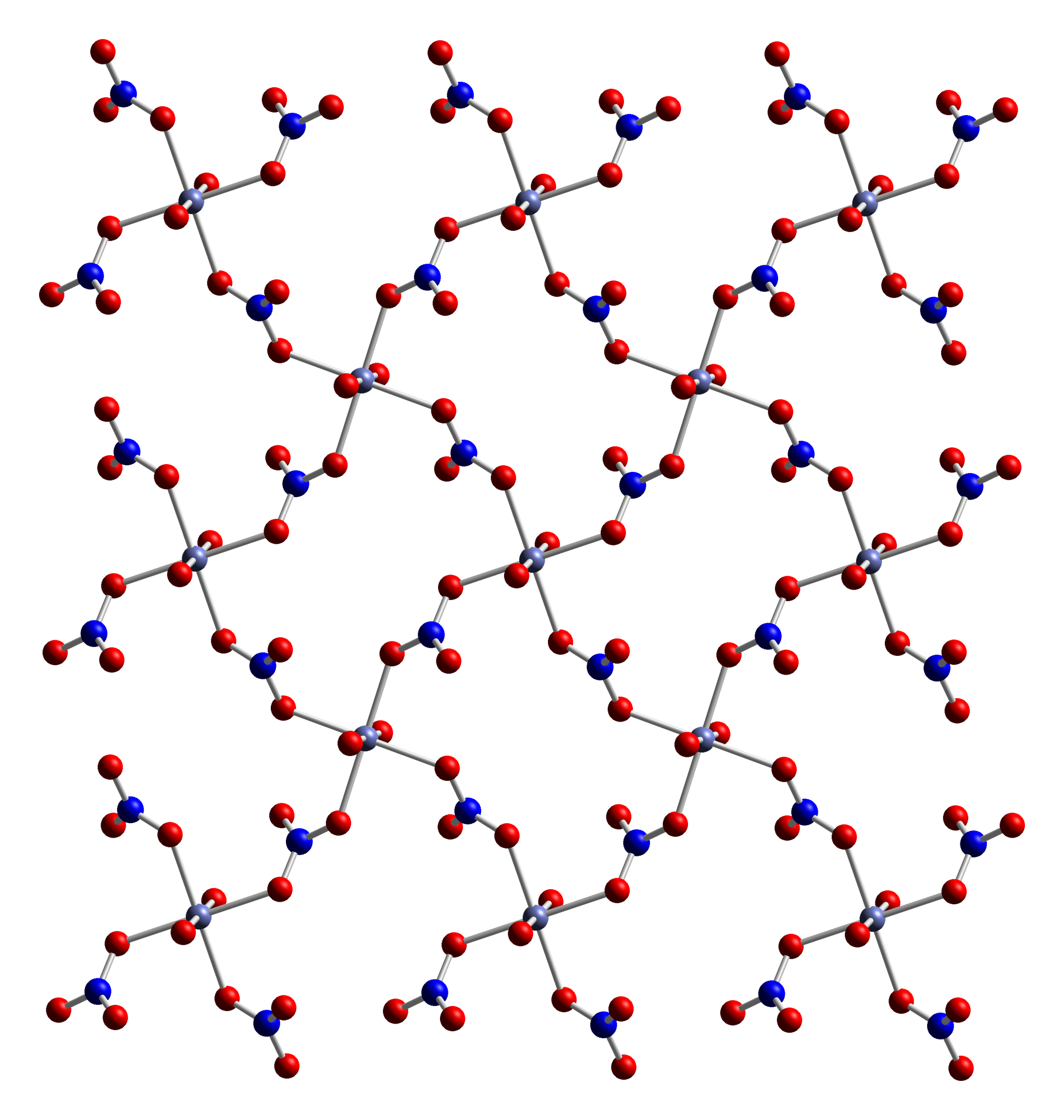
Co(NO_{3})_{2}·2H_{2}O

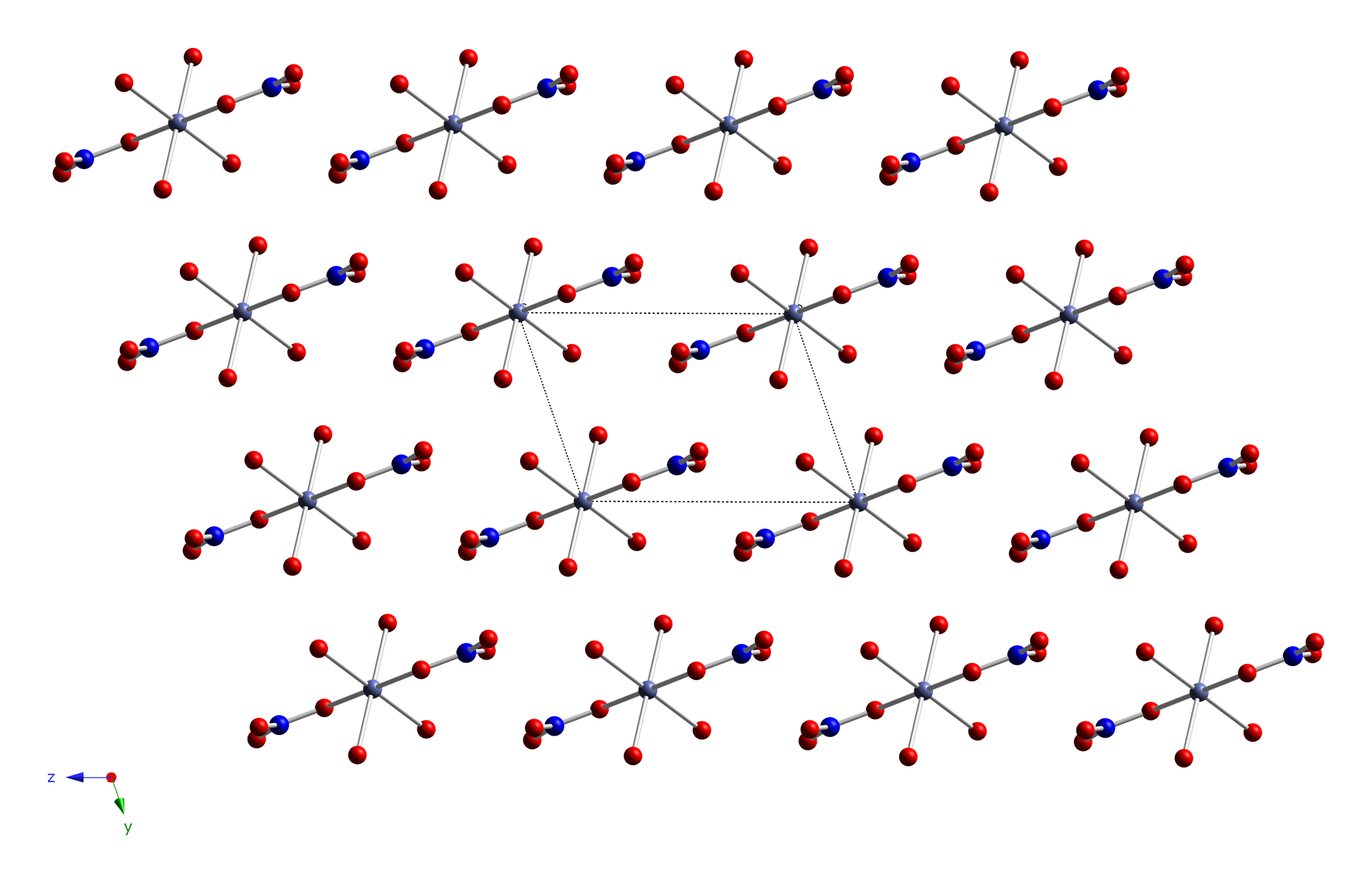
Co(NO_{3})_{2}·4H_{2}O

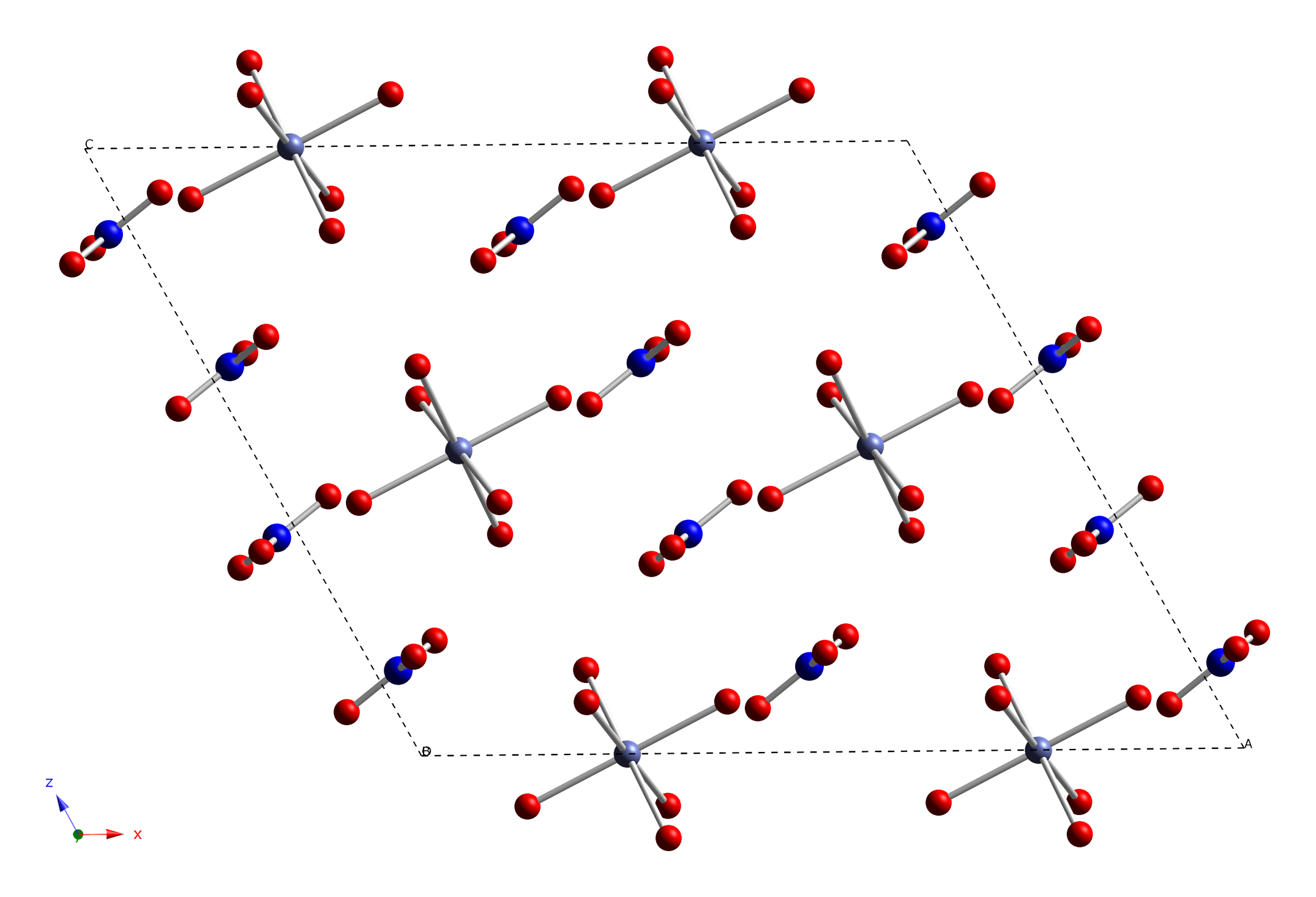
Co(NO_{3})_{2}·6H_{2}O

== Production ==
The hexahydrate is prepared treating metallic cobalt or one of its oxides, hydroxides, or carbonate with nitric acid:

Co + 4 HNO_{3} + 4 H_{2}O → Co(H_{2}O)_{6}(NO_{3})_{2} + 2 NO_{2}
CoO + 2 HNO_{3} + 5 H_{2}O → Co(H_{2}O)_{6}(NO_{3})_{2}
CoCO_{3} + 2 HNO_{3} + 5 H_{2}O → Co(H_{2}O)_{6}(NO_{3})_{2} + CO_{2}

== Uses and reactions ==
It is commonly reduced to metallic high purity cobalt. It can be absorbed on to various catalyst supports for use in Fischer–Tropsch catalysis. It is used in the preparation of dyes and inks.

Cobalt sulfides form by treating an aqueous solution of cobalt(II) nitrate with hydrogen sulfide according to the following idealized equation:

Co(NO_{3})_{2} + H_{2}S → CoS + 2 HNO_{3}

Cobalt(II) nitrate is a common starting material for the preparation of coordination complexes such as cobaloximes, carbonatotetraamminecobalt(III), and others.
