= Nickel(II) sulfate =

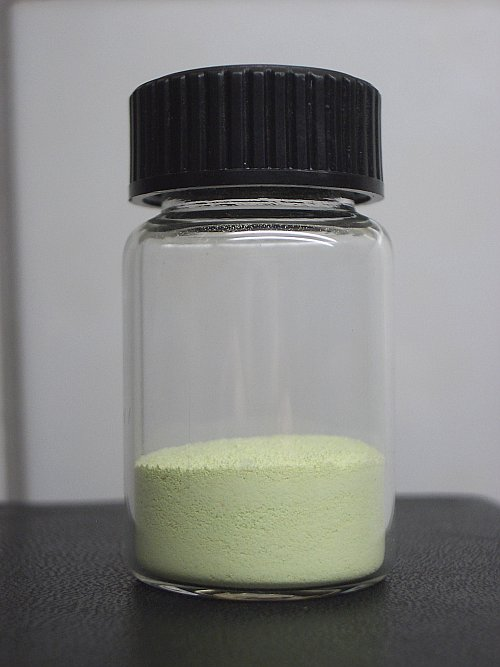
Anhydrous
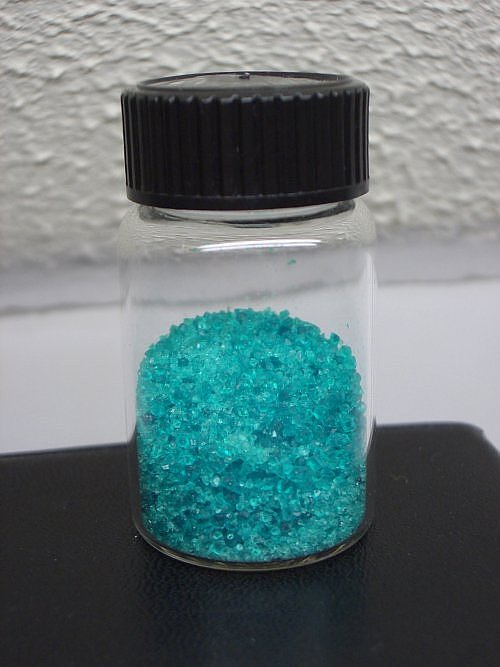
Hexahydrate
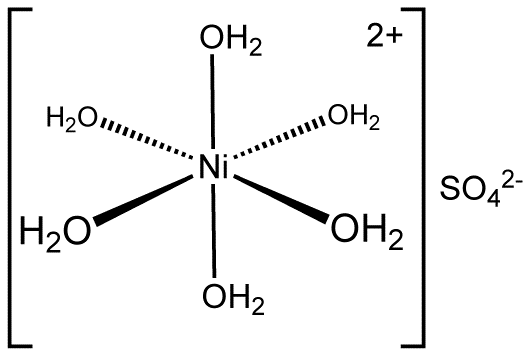

Names
- IUPAC name Nickel(II) sulfate
- Other names Nickelous sulfate Nickel (II) sulphate

Identifiers
CAS Number	7786-81-4 (anhydrous); 10101-97-0 (hexahydrate); 10101-98-1 (heptahydrate)
3D model (JSmol)	anhydrous: Interactive image; hexahydrate: Interactive image
ChEBI	CHEBI:53001
ChemSpider	22989
ECHA InfoCard	100.029.186
EC Number	232-104-9
PubChem CID	24586
RTECS number	QR9600000
UNII	4FLT4T3WUN; JC9WZ4FK68 (hexahydrate); 596IDD57NR (heptahydrate)
CompTox Dashboard (EPA)	DTXSID6023787
- InChI: InChI=1S/Ni.H2O4S/c;1-5(2,3)4/h;(H2,1,2,3,4)/q+2;/p-2 Key: LGQLOGILCSXPEA-UHFFFAOYSA-L; InChI=1/Ni.H2O4S/c;1-5(2,3)4/h;(H2,1,2,3,4)/q+2;/p-2 Key: LGQLOGILCSXPEA-NUQVWONBAG
- SMILES: anhydrous: [Ni+2].[O-]S([O-])(=O)=O; hexahydrate: [OH2+][Ni-4]([OH2+])([OH2+])([OH2+])([OH2+])[OH2+].[O-]S(=O)(=O)[O-]

Properties
Chemical formula	NiSO_{4}
Molar mass	154.75 g/mol (anhydrous); 262.85 g/mol (hexahydrate); 280.86 g/mol (heptahydrate)
Appearance	yellow-green solid (anhydrous) turquoise crystals (hexahydrate) turquoise crystals (heptahydrate)
Odor	odorless
Density	4.01 g/cm^{3} (anhydrous); 2.07 g/cm^{3} (hexahydrate); 1.948 g/cm^{3} (heptahydrate)
Melting point	1210 °C (anhydrous, at high pressure); 53 °C (hexahydrate)
Boiling point	> 640 °C (anhydrous, decomposes); 100 °C (hexahydrate, decomposes)
Solubility in water	65 g/100 mL (20 °C); 77.5 g/100 mL (30 °C) (heptahydrate)
Solubility	anhydrous insoluble in ethanol, ether, acetone hexahydrate insoluble in ethanol, ammonia heptahydrate soluble in alcohol
Acidity (pK_{a})	4.5 (hexahydrate)
Magnetic susceptibility (χ)	+4005.0·10^{−6} cm^{3}/mol
Refractive index (n_{D})	1.511 (hexahydrate); 1.467 (heptahydrate)

Structure
Crystal structure	orthorombic (anhydrous) tetragonal (hexahydrate) rhombohedral (heptahydrate)

Hazards
- GHS labelling
Pictograms	(GHS08: Health hazard) (GHS07: Exclamation mark) (GHS09: Environmental hazard)
Signal word	Danger
Hazard statements	H302+H332, H315, H317, H334, H341, H350, H360D, H372, H410
Precautionary statements	P201, P261, P273, P280, P308+P313, P501
NFPA 704 (fire diamond)	3 0 0
Flash point	Non-flammable
- Lethal dose or concentration (LD, LC)
LD_{50} (median dose)	264 mg/kg
Safety data sheet (SDS)	External MSDS

Related compounds
Other cations	Cobalt(II) sulfate Copper(II) sulfate Iron(II) sulfate
- Except where otherwise noted, data are given for materials in their standard state (at 25 °C [77 °F], 100 kPa). verify (what is ?) Infobox references

Nickel(II) sulfate, or just nickel sulfate, usually refers to the inorganic compound with the formula NiSO_{4}(H_{2}O)_{6}. This highly soluble turquoise coloured salt is a common source of the Ni^{2+} ion for electroplating. Approximately 40,000 tonnes were produced in 2005.

== Structures ==
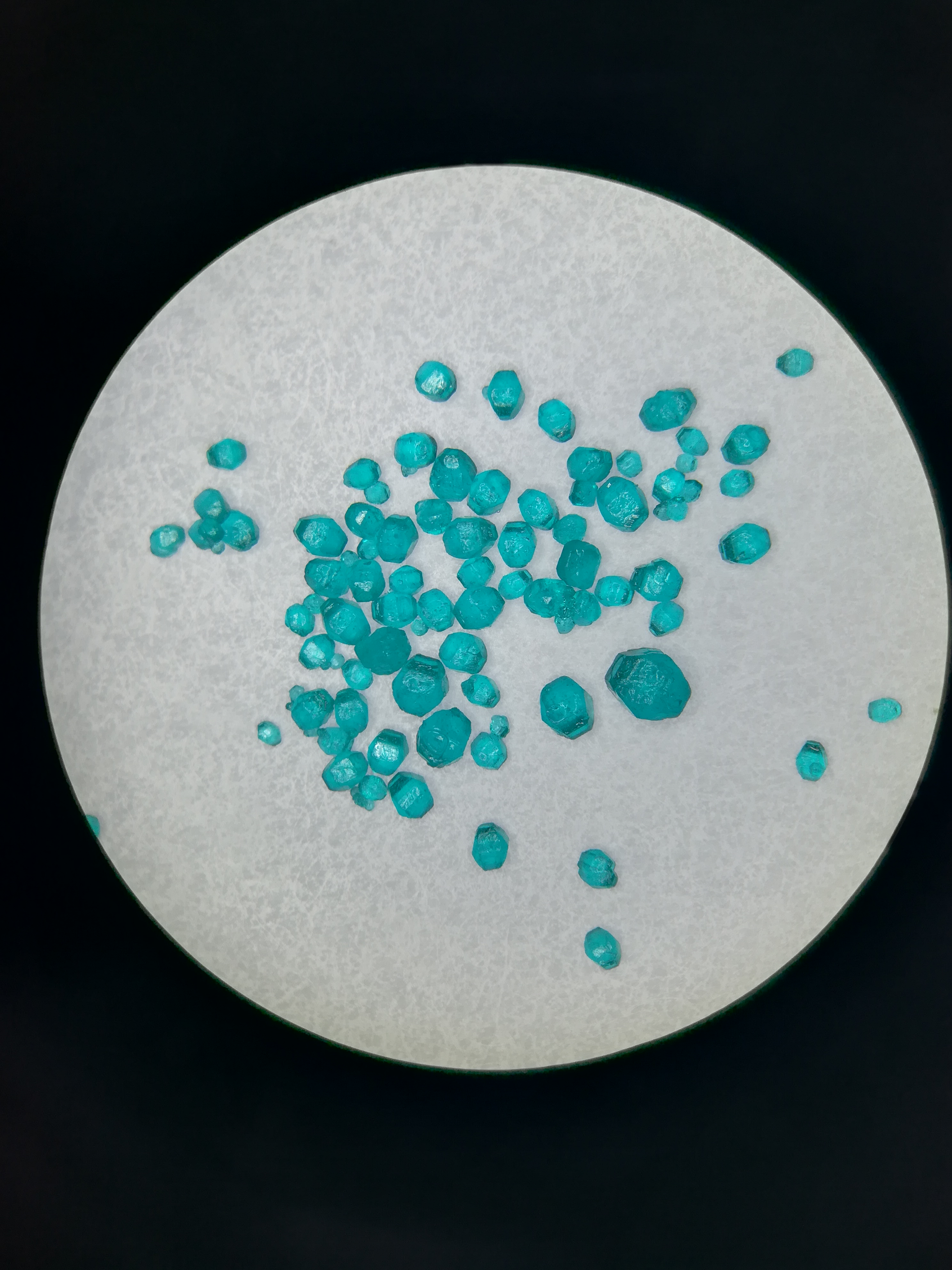
Nickel sulfate hexahydrate under a microscope.

At least seven sulfate salts of nickel(II) are known. These salts differ in terms of their hydration or crystal habit.

The common tetragonal hexahydrate crystallizes from aqueous solution between 30.7 and 53.8 °C. Below these temperatures, a heptahydrate crystallises, and above these temperatures an orthorhombic hexahydrate forms. The yellow anhydrous form, NiSO_{4}, crystallizes in orthorhombic crystal system and at standard pressure decomposes to NiO at temperatures above 640 °C, before reaching the melting point. It melts only at high system pressure, using a constant volume method the melting point was found to be 1210 °C. The anhydrous sulfate is produced by heating the hydrates above 330 °C.

X-ray crystallography measurements show that NiSO_{4}·6H_{2}O consists of the octahedral [Ni(H_{2}O)_{6}]^{2+} ions. These ions in turn are hydrogen bonded to sulfate ions. Dissolution of the salt in water gives solutions containing the aquo complex [Ni(H_{2}O)_{6}]^{2+}.

All nickel sulfates are paramagnetic.

== Production, applications, and coordination chemistry ==
The salt is usually obtained as a by-product of copper refining. It can also be produced by dissolution of nickel metal or nickel oxides in sulfuric acid.

Aqueous solutions of nickel sulfate react with sodium carbonate to precipitate nickel carbonate, a precursor to nickel-based catalysts and pigments. Addition of ammonium sulfate to concentrated aqueous solutions of nickel sulfate precipitates Ni(NH_{4})_{2}(SO_{4})_{2}·6H_{2}O. This blue-coloured solid is analogous to Mohr's salt, Fe(NH_{4})_{2}(SO_{4})_{2}·6H_{2}O.

Nickel sulfate has some uses in the laboratory. Columns used in polyhistidine-tagging, useful in biochemistry and molecular biology, are regenerated with nickel sulfate. Aqueous solutions of NiSO_{4}·6H_{2}O and related hydrates react with ammonia to give [Ni(NH_{3})_{6}]SO_{4} and with ethylenediamine to give the complex [Ni(H_{2}NCH_{2}CH_{2}NH_{2})_{3}]SO_{4}. The latter is occasionally used as a calibrant for magnetic susceptibility measurements because it has no tendency to hydrate.

== Natural occurrence ==
Nickel sulfate occurs as the rare mineral retgersite, which is a hexahydrate. The second hexahydrate is known as nickelhexahydrite (Ni,Mg,Fe)SO_{4}·6H_{2}O, which is the monoclinic dimorph of retgersite. The heptahydrate, which is relatively unstable in air, occurs as morenosite. The monohydrate occurs as the very rare mineral dwornikite (Ni,Fe)SO_{4}·H_{2}O.

== Safety ==
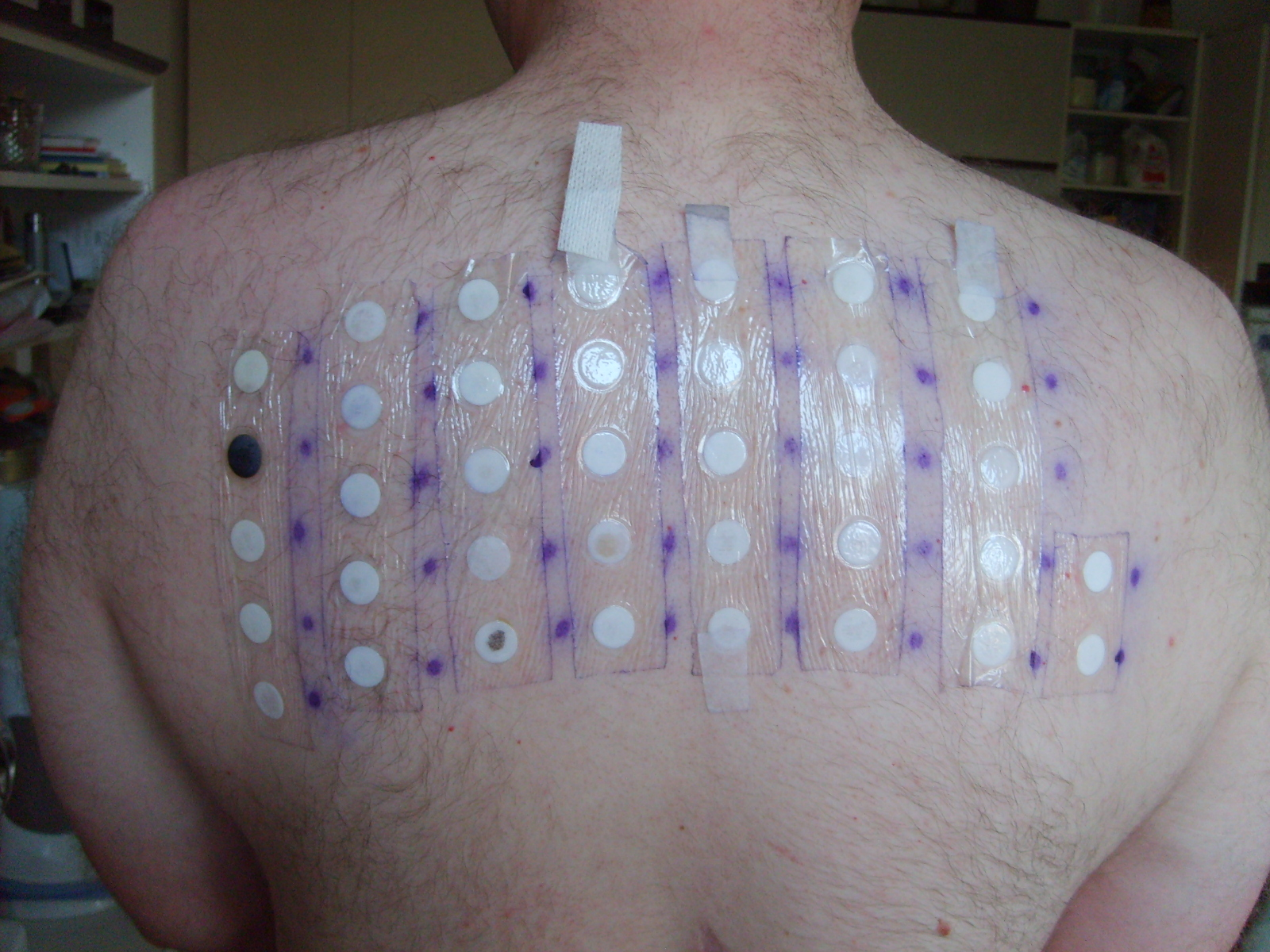
Patch test

In 2005–2006, nickel sulfate was the top allergen in patch tests (19.0%). Nickel sulfate is classified as a human carcinogen based on increased respiratory cancer risks observed in epidemiological studies of sulfidic ore refinery workers. In a 2-year inhalation study in F344 rats and B6C3F1 mice, there was no evidence of carcinogenic activity, although increased lung inflammations and bronchial lymph node hyperplasia were observed. These results strongly suggest that there is a threshold for the carcinogenicity of nickel sulfate via inhalation. In a 2-year study with daily oral administration of nickel sulfate hexahydrate to F344 rats, no evidence for increased carcinogenic activity was observed. The human and animal data consistently indicate a lack of carcinogenicity via the oral route of exposure and limit the carcinogenicity of nickel compounds to respiratory tumours after inhalation. Whether these effects are relevant to humans is unclear as epidemiological studies of highly exposed female workers have not shown adverse developmental toxicity effects.
