= Titanyl sulfate =

- TiO^{2+} SO_{4}^{2−}

Identifiers
CAS Number	13825-74-6; monohydrate: 123334-00-9
3D model (JSmol)	Interactive image; monohydrate: Interactive image
ChemSpider	9041905; monohydrate: 35294372
ECHA InfoCard	100.034.098
PubChem CID	10866624; monohydrate: 71312680
UNII	6XWR967CBZ
CompTox Dashboard (EPA)	DTXSID20893951
- InChI: InChI=1S/H2O4S.O.Ti/c1-5(2,3)4;;/h(H2,1,2,3,4);;/q;;+2/p-2 Key: KADRTWZQWGIUGO-UHFFFAOYSA-L; monohydrate: InChI=1S/H2O4S.H2O.O.Ti/c1-5(2,3)4;;;/h(H2,1,2,3,4);1H2;;/q;;;+2/p-2 Key: SWNAGNPMPHSIJF-UHFFFAOYSA-L
- SMILES: [O-]S(=O)(=O)[O-].O=[Ti+2]; monohydrate: O.[O-]S(=O)(=O)[O-].O=[Ti+2]

Properties
Chemical formula	O_{5}STi
Molar mass	159.92 g·mol^{−1}
Density	1.3984 g/cm^{3}
- Except where otherwise noted, data are given for materials in their standard state (at 25 °C [77 °F], 100 kPa). Infobox references

Titanyl sulfate is the inorganic compound with the formula TiOSO_{4}. It is a white salt that forms by treatment of titanium dioxide with sulfuric acid, either directly or indirectly. It hydrolyzes to a gel of hydrated titanium dioxide. Characteristic of most titanium(IV) compounds with oxygen-containing ligands, the species also includes oxo ligands.

== Preparation ==
A number of methods provide titanium(IV) sulfates. One approach begins with K_{2}TiO(C_{2}O_{4})_{2}·2H_{2}O, which can be obtained from hydrous titanium(IV) oxides. This salt is treated with hot aqueous sulfuric acid to degrade the oxalate:

K_{2}TiO(C_{2}O_{4})_{2}·2H_{2}O + 2 H_{2}SO_{4} → K_{2}SO_{4} + TiOSO_{4} + 2 CO + 2 CO_{2} + 4 H_{2}O

== Structure ==
The structure consists of dense polymeric network with tetrahedral sulfur and octahedral titanium centers. The six ligands attached to titanium are derived from four different sulfate moieties and a bridging oxide. A monohydrate is also known, being prepared similarly to the anhydrous material. In the hydrate, one Ti-OSO_{3} bond is replaced by Ti-OH_{2}.

Structure of titanyl sulfate and its fragments

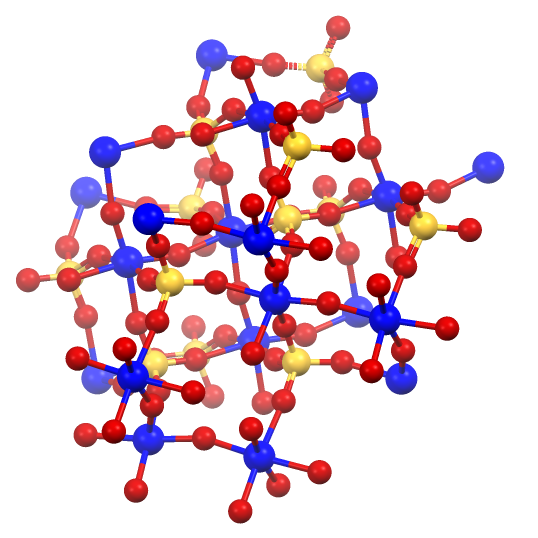
Hydrated TiOSO_{4} showing packing

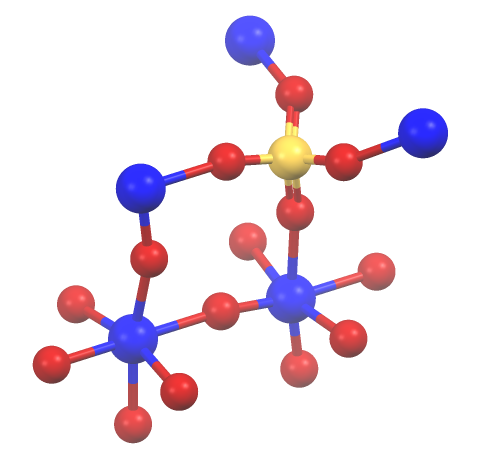
TiOSO_{4}, illustrating the connectivity between sulfate and titanium centers

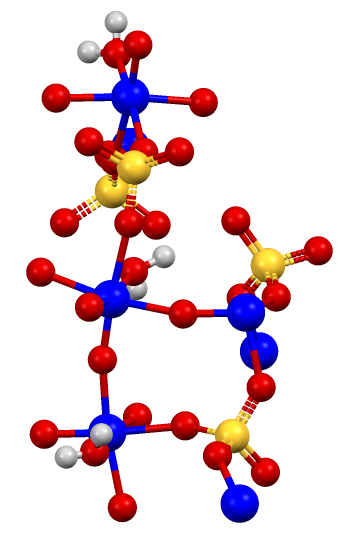
TiOSO_{4}·H_{2}O, showing the presence of water

Color code: Ti = blue, O = red, and S = yellow
