= Nickel(II) nitrate =

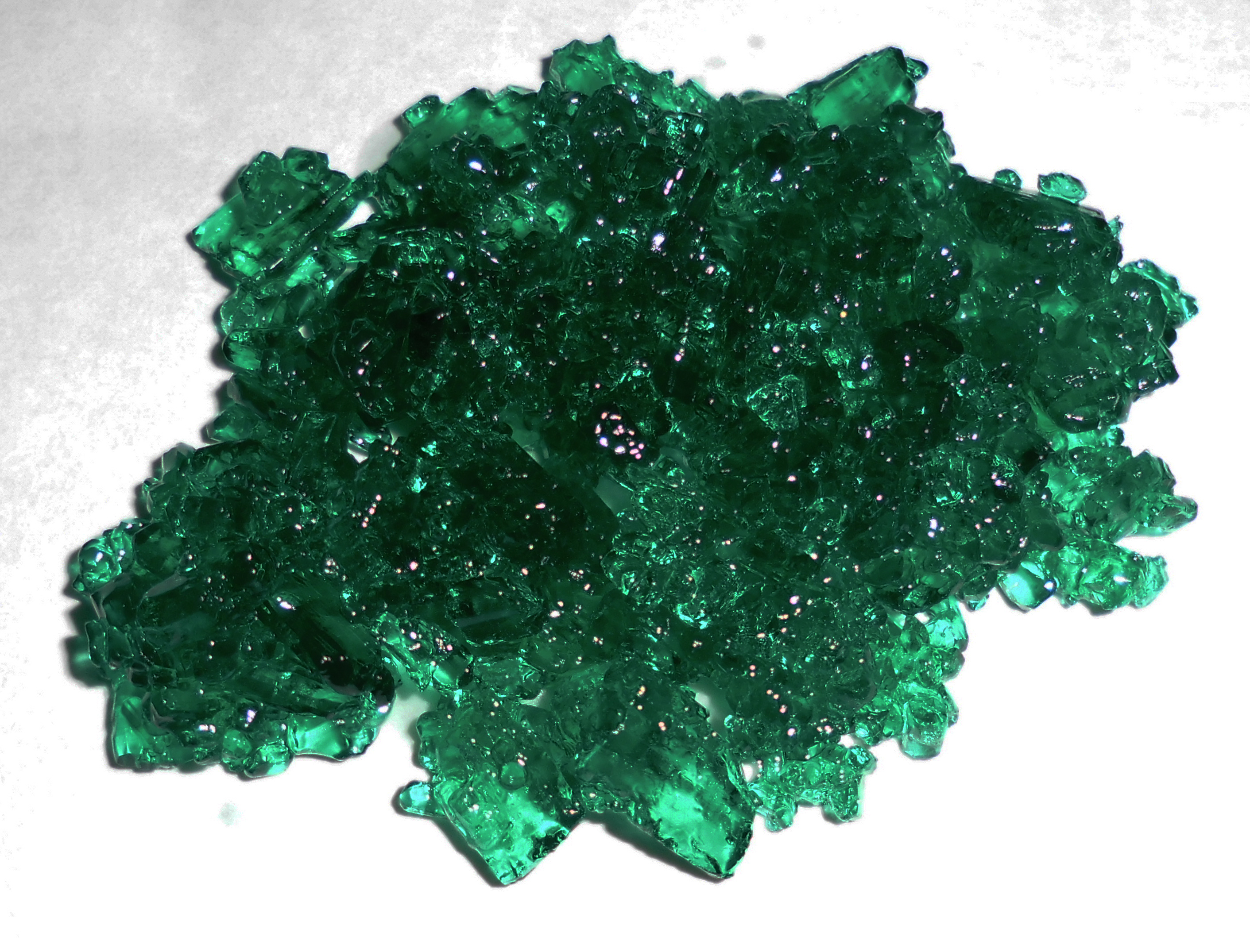
- Nickel(II) nitrate Hexahydrate

- Nickel(II) nitrate

Names
- IUPAC name Nickel(II) nitrate
- Other names Nickel nitrate Nickelous nitrate Nitric acid, nickel(2+) salt

Identifiers
CAS Number	13138-45-9 anhydrous; 13478-00-7 hexahydrate; 72937-94-1 tetrahydrate (rare); 16456-84-1 2nd tetrahydrate (also rare)
3D model (JSmol)	Interactive image
ChemSpider	23976
ECHA InfoCard	100.032.774
EC Number	238-076-4
PubChem CID	25736
UNII	50L0S38I2D; XBT61WLT1J
UN number	2725
CompTox Dashboard (EPA)	DTXSID70872958
- InChI: InChI=1S/2NO3.Ni/c2*2-1(3)4;/q2*-1;+2 Key: KBJMLQFLOWQJNF-UHFFFAOYSA-N; InChI=1/2NO3.Ni/c2*2-1(3)4;/q2*-1;+2 Key: KBJMLQFLOWQJNF-UHFFFAOYAP
- SMILES: [Ni+2].[O-][N+]([O-])=O.[O-][N+]([O-])=O

Properties
Chemical formula	Ni(NO_{3})_{2}
Molar mass	182.703 g/mol (anhydrous); 290.79 g/mol (hexahydrate)
Appearance	emerald green hygroscopic solid
Odor	odorless
Density	2.05 g/cm^{3} (hexahydrate)
Melting point	56.7 °C (134.1 °F; 329.8 K) (hexahydrate)
Boiling point	120–145 °C (248–293 °F; 393–418 K) (hexahydrate, decomposes to basic nickel nitrate)
Solubility in water	243 (hexahydrate) g/100ml (0 °C)
Solubility	soluble in ethanol
Magnetic susceptibility (χ)	+4300.0·10^{−6} cm^{3}/mol (+6 H_{2}O)
Refractive index (n_{D})	1.422 (hexahydrate)

Structure
Crystal structure	monoclinic (hexahydrate)

Hazards
- GHS labelling
Pictograms	(GHS03: Oxidizing) (GHS05: Corrosive) (GHS07: Exclamation mark) (GHS08: Health hazard) (GHS09: Environmental hazard)
Signal word	Danger
Hazard statements	H272, H302, H315, H317, H318, H332, H334, H341, H350, H360, H372, H410
Precautionary statements	P201, P202, P210, P220, P221, P260, P264, P270, P271, P272, P273, P280, P281, P285, P301+P312, P302+P352, P304+P312, P304+P340, P304+P341, P305+P351+P338, P308+P313, P310, P312, P314, P321, P330, P332+P313, P333+P313, P342+P311, P362, P363, P370+P378, P391, P405, P501
NFPA 704 (fire diamond)	2 0 0 OX
Flash point	Non-flammable
- Lethal dose or concentration (LD, LC)
LD_{50} (median dose)	1620 mg/kg (oral, rat)
Safety data sheet (SDS)	External MSDS

Related compounds
Other anions	Nickel(II) sulfate Nickel(II) chloride
Other cations	Palladium(II) nitrate
Related compounds	Cobalt(II) nitrate Copper(II) nitrate
- Except where otherwise noted, data are given for materials in their standard state (at 25 °C [77 °F], 100 kPa). verify (what is ?) Infobox references

Nickel(II) nitrate is the inorganic compound Ni(NO_{3})_{2} or any hydrate thereof. In the hexahydrate, the nitrate anions are not bonded to nickel. Other hydrates have also been reported: Ni(NO_{3})_{2}^{.}9H_{2}O, Ni(NO_{3})_{2}^{.}4H_{2}O, and Ni(NO_{3})_{2}^{.}2H_{2}O.

It is prepared by the reaction of nickel oxide with nitric acid:

NiO + 2 HNO_{3} + 5 H_{2}O → Ni(NO_{3})_{2}^{.}6H_{2}O

The anhydrous nickel nitrate is typically not prepared by heating the hydrates. Rather it is generated by the reaction of hydrates with dinitrogen pentoxide or of nickel carbonyl with dinitrogen tetroxide:

Ni(CO)_{4} + 2 N_{2}O_{4} → Ni(NO_{3})_{2} + 2 NO + 4 CO

The hydrated nitrate is often used as a precursor to supported nickel catalysts.

== Structure ==
Nickel(II) compounds with oxygenated ligands often feature octahedral coordination geometry. Two polymorphs of the tetrahydrate Ni(NO_{3})_{2}^{.}4H_{2}O have been crystallized. In one the monodentate nitrate ligands are trans while in the other they are cis.

== Reactions and uses ==
Nickel(II) nitrate is primarily used in electrotyping and electroplating of metallic nickel.

In heterogeneous catalysis, nickel(II) nitrate is used to impregnate alumina. Pyrolysis of the resulting material gives forms of Raney nickel and Urushibara nickel. In homogeneous catalysis, the hexahydrate is a precatalyst for cross coupling reactions.
