= Chromium(II) sulfate =

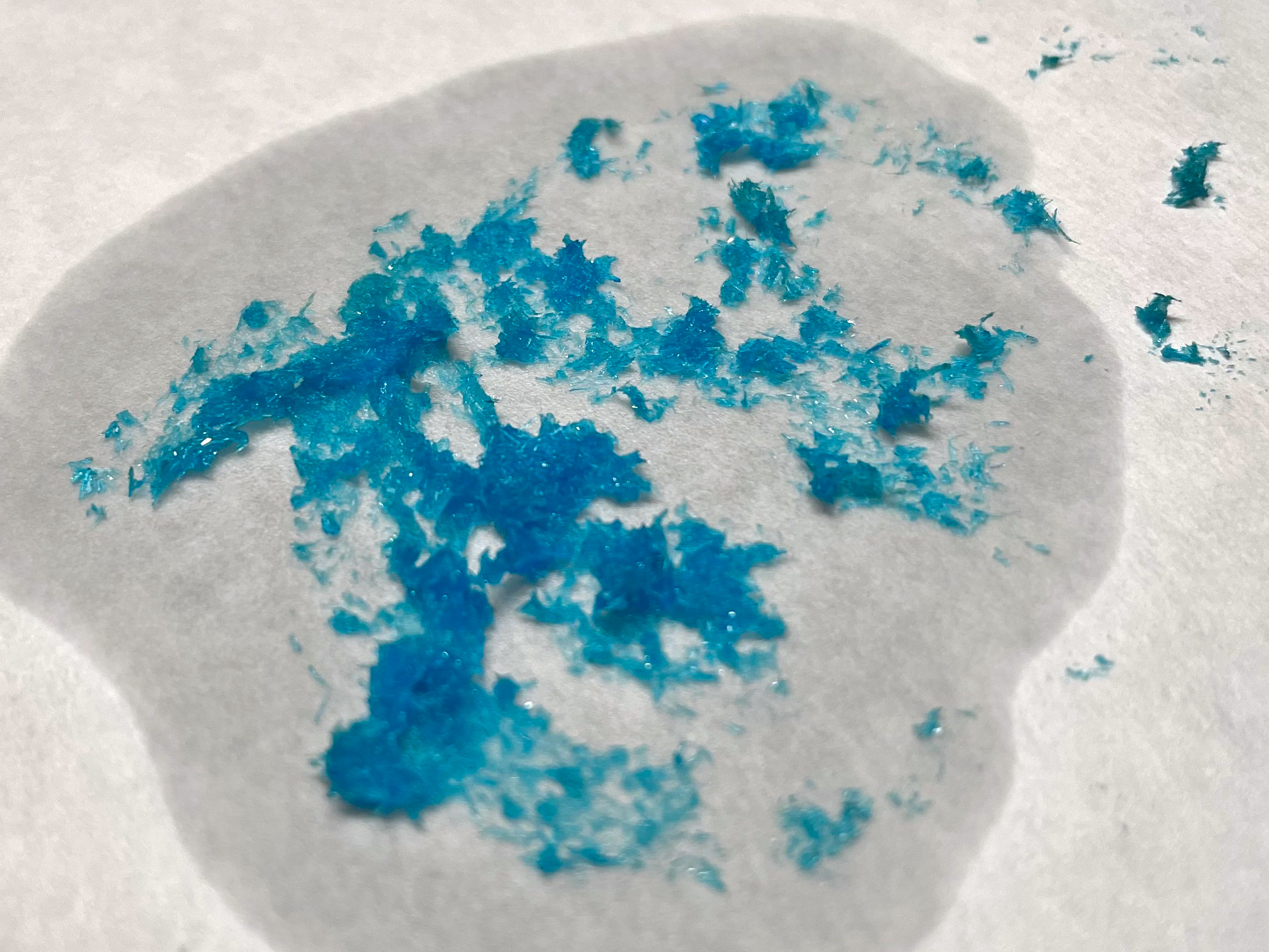
- Crystalline sample wet with ethanol

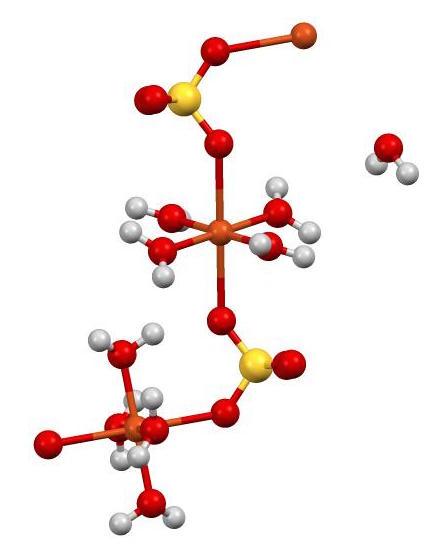
- Structure of chromium(II) sulfate pentahydrate (CrSO_{4}·5H_{2}O) Chromium, Cr Sulfur, S Oxygen, O Hydrogen, H

Names
- IUPAC name Chromium(2+) sulfate
- Other names: Chromous sulfate; Chromous sulphate

Identifiers
CAS Number	13825-86-0 (anhydrous); 15928-77-5 (pentahydrate); 19512-13-1 (trihydrate)
3D model (JSmol)	anhydrous: Interactive image; pentahydrate: Interactive image
ChemSpider	55589 (anhydrous)
PubChem CID	61686 (anhydrous)
UNII	Y0C99N5TMZ (anhydrous); 990MUV05EC (pentahydrate)
CompTox Dashboard (EPA)	DTXSID80160555
- InChI: Key: RYPRIXSYXLDSOA-UHFFFAOYSA-L; Key: RYPRIXSYXLDSOA-NUQVWONBAQ
- SMILES: anhydrous: [Cr+2].[O-]S(=O)(=O)[O-]; pentahydrate: [OH2+][Cr-3]([OH2+])([OH2+])([OH2+])O(S(=O)(=O)[O-]).O

Properties
Chemical formula	CrSO_{4} (anhydrous); CrSO_{4}·5H_{2}O (pentahydrate)
Molar mass	148.05 g/mol (anhydrous); 238.13 g/mol (pentahydrate)
Appearance	Blue crystalline solid (pentahydrate)
Solubility in water	21 g/(100 mL) (0°C, pentahydrate)
- Except where otherwise noted, data are given for materials in their standard state (at 25 °C [77 °F], 100 kPa). Infobox references

Chromium(II) sulfate is an inorganic compound with the chemical formula CrSO_{4}. Several hydrated salts are known (CrSO_{4}·nH_{2}O). The pentahydrate (CrSO_{4}·5H_{2}O) is a blue solid that dissolves readily in water. Solutions of chromium(II) are easily oxidized by air to Cr(III) species.

== Structure ==
In aqueous solution, chromium(II) sulfate forms metal aquo complexes, presumably with six water ligands. The structures of the crystalline salts are similar to the corresponding hydrates of copper(II) sulfate: pentahydrate, trihydrate, monohydrate, and anhydrous derivatives of chromous sulfate are known. In all of these compounds, the Cr(II) centre adopts octahedral coordination geometry, being coordinated to six oxygen centers provided by a combination of water and sulfate ligands.

== Preparation ==
The salt is produced by treating chromium metal with aqueous sulfuric acid:

Cr + H_{2}SO_{4} + 5 H_{2}O → CrSO_{4}·5H_{2}O + H_{2}

It can be produced through the reaction of sulfate salts and chromium(II) acetate or, for in situ use, the reduction of chromium(III) sulfate with zinc.

== Uses ==
Solutions of Cr(II) are used as specialized reducing agents of value in organic synthesis.
