= Manganese(II) nitrate =

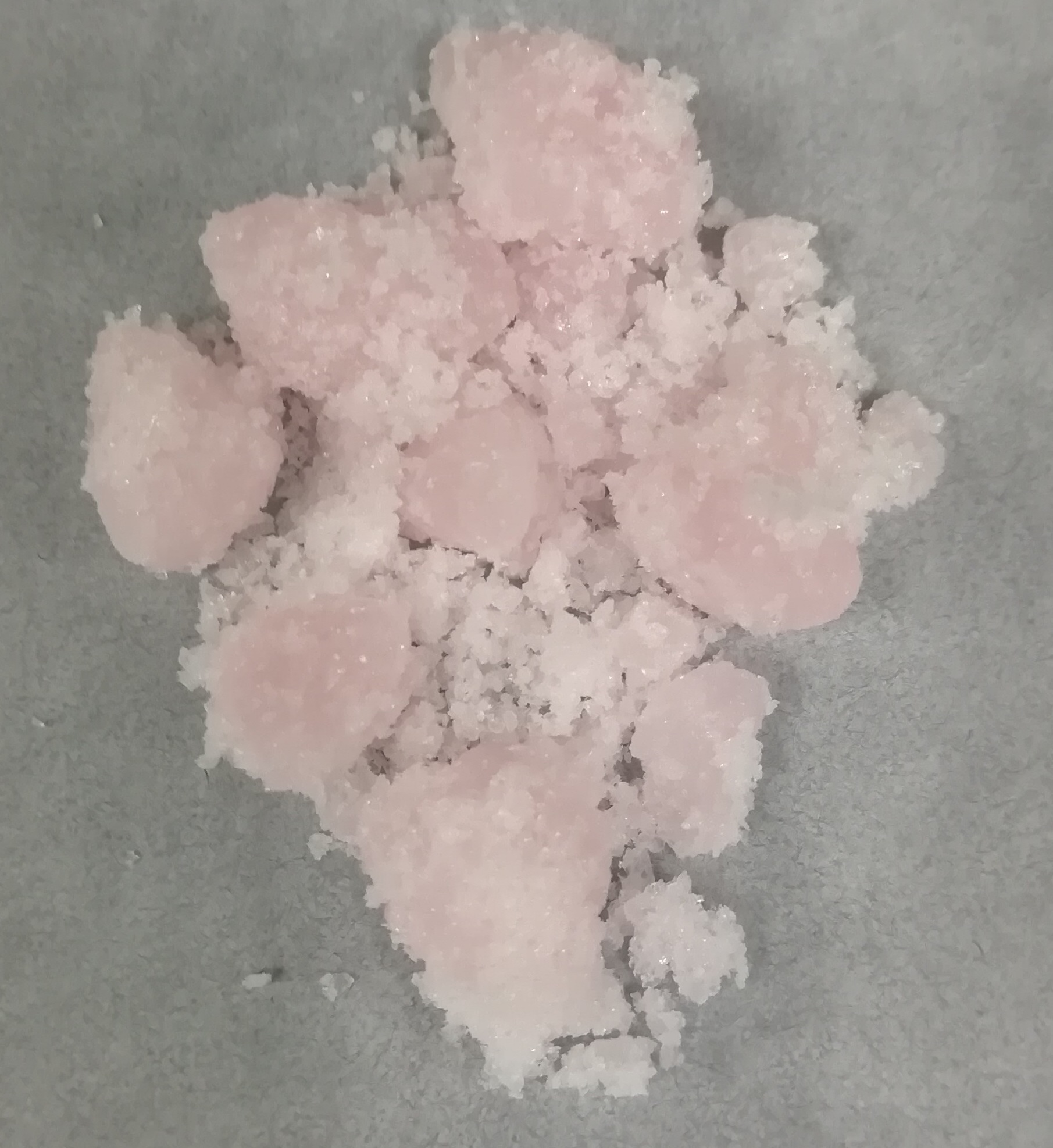
- Manganese(II) nitrate tetrahydrate Tetrahydrate

Names
- Systematic IUPAC name Manganese(II) nitrate
- Other names Manganese dinitrate

Identifiers
CAS Number	10377-66-9; 20694-39-7 (tetrahydrate); 17141-63-8 (hexahydrate)
3D model (JSmol)	Interactive image
ChemSpider	55431
ECHA InfoCard	100.030.741
EC Number	233-828-8
PubChem CID	61511
UNII	I389H78514; 03M0G68R5F (tetrahydrate); W5UG18WBJA (hexahydrate)
UN number	2724
CompTox Dashboard (EPA)	DTXSID90890659
- InChI: InChI=1S/Mn.2NO3/c;2*2-1(3)4/q+2;2*-1 Key: MIVBAHRSNUNMPP-UHFFFAOYSA-N; InChI=1/Mn.2NO3/c;2*2-1(3)4/q+2;2*-1 Key: MIVBAHRSNUNMPP-UHFFFAOYAV
- SMILES: [N+](=O)([O-])[O-].[N+](=O)([O-])[O-].[Mn+2]

Properties
Chemical formula	Mn(NO_{3})_{2}
Molar mass	178.95 g/mol
Appearance	white powder
Density	1.536 g/cm^{3}
Melting point	37 °C (99 °F; 310 K)
Boiling point	100 °C (212 °F; 373 K)
Solubility in water	118 g/100 ml(10°C)

Related compounds
Other anions	Manganese chloride
Other cations	Magnesium nitrate Calcium nitrate
- Except where otherwise noted, data are given for materials in their standard state (at 25 °C [77 °F], 100 kPa). verify (what is ?) Infobox references

Manganese(II) nitrate refers to the inorganic compounds with formula Mn(NO_{3})_{2}·(H_{2}O)_{n}. These compounds are nitrate salts containing varying amounts of water. A common derivative is the tetrahydrate, Mn(NO_{3})_{2}·4H_{2}O, but mono- and hexahydrates are also known as well as the anhydrous compound. Some of these compounds are useful precursors to the oxides of manganese. Typical of a manganese(II) compound, it is a paramagnetic pale pink solid.

== Structure ==
Manganese(II) compounds, especially with oxygenated ligands, are typically octahedral. Following this trend, the tetrahydrate features four aquo ligands bound to Mn as well as two mutually cis, unidentate nitrate ligands. The hexaaquo salt features octahedral [Mn(H_{2}O)_{6}]^{2+}.

== Preparation, reactions, uses ==
Manganese(II) nitrate is prepared from manganese dioxide and nitrogen dioxide:

MnO_{2} + 2 NO_{2} + 4 H_{2}O → Mn(H_{2}O)_{4}(NO_{3})_{2}

In this redox reaction, two moles of the reductant NO_{2} (gas) donate each one electron to MnO_{2} (black solid), the oxidant, which is reduced from its oxidation state (+4) to its lower state (+2). Simultaneously, NO_{2} (+4) is oxidized to form nitrate (NO^{−}_{3}) (+5).

Heating the tetrahydrate to 110 °C gives the pale yellow monohydrate. The reaction is reversible in the sense that heating the Mn(II) dinitrate to 450 °C gives a slightly nonstoichiometric Mn(IV) dioxide.

Manganese(II) nitrate is the precursor to manganese(II) carbonate (MnCO_{3}), which is used in fertilizers and as a colourant. The advantage of this method, based on the use of ammonia (NH_{3}) and carbon dioxide (CO_{2}) as reaction intermediates, being that the side product ammonium nitrate (NH_{4}NO_{3}) is also useful as a fertilizer.
