= Manganese chloride =

Manganese chloride may refer to:

- Manganese(II) chloride (manganous chloride, manganese dichloride), MnCl_{2}, stable pink solid
- Manganese(III) chloride (manganic chloride, manganese trichloride), MnCl_{3}, hypothetical chemical compound
