= Palladium(II) nitrate =

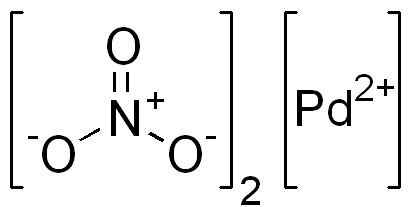

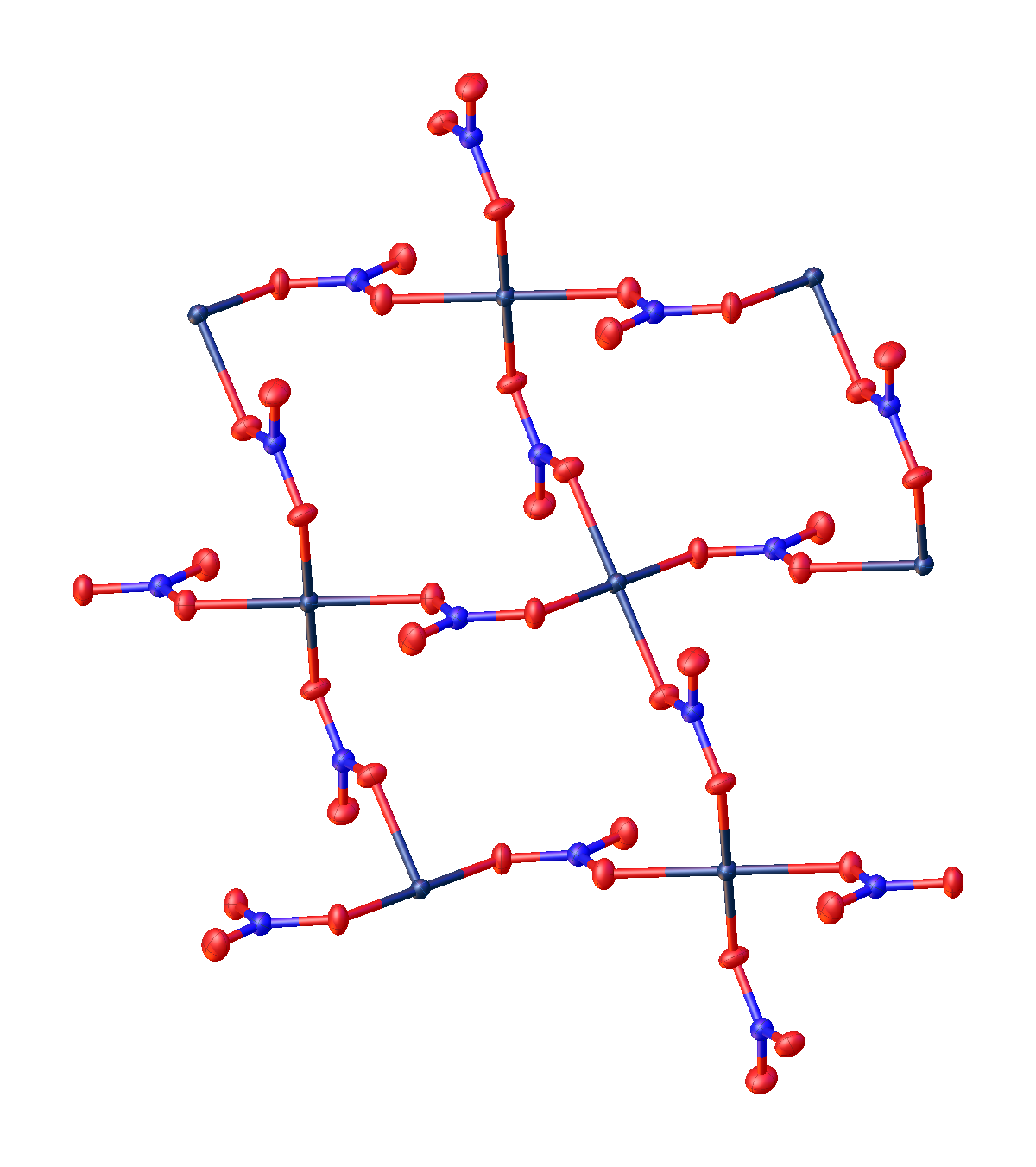

Names
- IUPAC name Palladium(II) nitrate
- Other names Palladium nitrate Palladous nitrate

Identifiers
CAS Number	10102-05-3
3D model (JSmol)	Interactive image
ChemSpider	23306
ECHA InfoCard	100.030.228
PubChem CID	24932
UNII	5G27LBZ05U
CompTox Dashboard (EPA)	DTXSID60881413
- InChI: InChI=1S/2NO3.Pd/c2*2-1(3)4;/q2*-1;+2 Key: GPNDARIEYHPYAY-UHFFFAOYSA-N; InChI=1/2NO3.Pd/c2*2-1(3)4;/q2*-1;+2 Key: GPNDARIEYHPYAY-UHFFFAOYAP
- SMILES: [Pd+2].[O-][N+]([O-])=O.[O-][N+]([O-])=O

Properties
Chemical formula	Pd(NO_{3})_{2}
Molar mass	230.43 g/mol
Appearance	yellow solid
Density	3.546 g/cm^{3}
Melting point	Decomposes >100 °C
Solubility in water	Soluble

Hazards
- Occupational safety and health (OHS/OSH)
Main hazards	Irritant, possibility of allergic reaction
- GHS labelling
Pictograms	(GHS03: Oxidizing) (GHS05: Corrosive) (GHS07: Exclamation mark) (GHS09: Environmental hazard)
Signal word	Danger
Hazard statements	H271, H272, H290, H302, H314, H410
Precautionary statements	P210, P220, P234, P260, P264, P264+P265, P270, P273, P280, P283, P301+P317, P301+P330+P331, P302+P361+P354, P304+P340, P305+P354+P338, P306+P360, P316, P317, P321, P330, P363, P370+P378, P371+P380+P375, P390, P391, P405, P420, P501
Flash point	Non-flammable

Related compounds
Other anions	Palladium(II) chloride
Other cations	Nickel(II) nitrate
Related compounds	Silver nitrate
- Except where otherwise noted, data are given for materials in their standard state (at 25 °C [77 °F], 100 kPa). verify (what is ?) Infobox references

Palladium(II) nitrate is the inorganic compound with the formula Pd(NO_{3})_{2}.(H_{2}O)_{x} where x = 0 or 2. The anhydrous and dihydrate are deliquescent solids. According to X-ray crystallography, both compounds feature square planar Pd(II) with unidentate nitrate ligands. The anhydrous compound, which is a coordination polymer, is yellow.

As a solution in nitric acid, Pd(NO_{3})_{2} catalyzes the conversion of alkenes to dinitrate esters. Its pyrolysis affords palladium oxide.

== Preparation ==
Hydrated palladium nitrate may be prepared by dissolving palladium oxide hydrate in dilute nitric acid followed by crystallization. The nitrate crystallizes as yellow-brown deliquescent prisms. The anhydrous material is obtained by treating palladium metal with fuming nitric acid.
