= Iron(III) nitrate =

- Chemical structure of ferric nitrate aquo complex

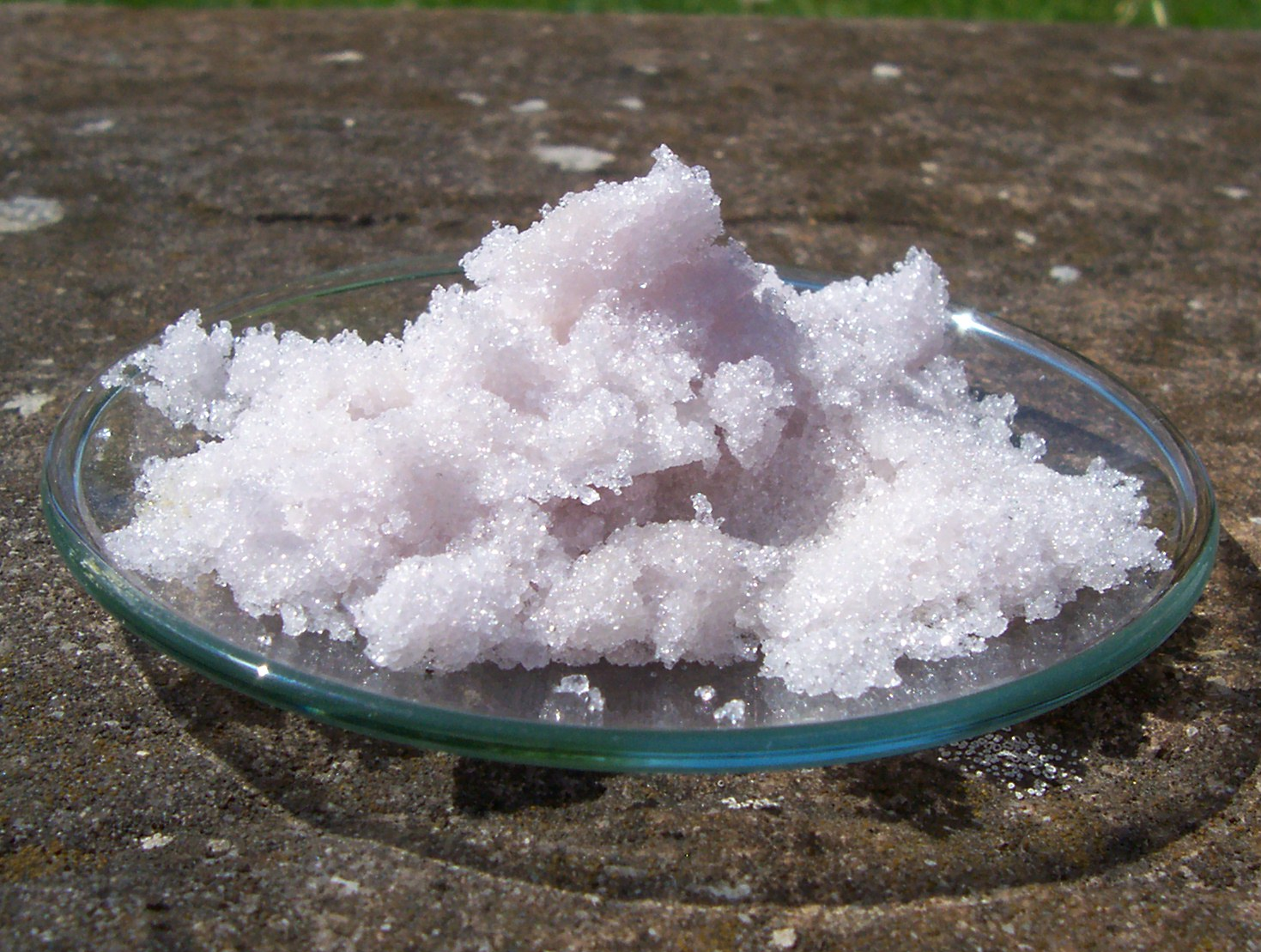
- Iron(III) nitrate nonahydrate Sample of ferric nitrate nonahydrate

Names
- IUPAC name Iron(III) nitrate
- Other names Ferric nitrate Nitric acid, iron(3+) salt

Identifiers
CAS Number	10421-48-4; 7782-61-8 (nonahydrate)
3D model (JSmol)	Interactive image
ChemSpider	10670706
ECHA InfoCard	100.030.805
PubChem CID	25251
RTECS number	NO7175000
UNII	N8H8402XOB
CompTox Dashboard (EPA)	DTXSID4065070
- InChI: InChI=1S/Fe.3NO3.9H2O/c;3*2-1(3)4;;;;;;;;;/h;;;;9*1H2/q+3;3*-1;;;;;;;;; Key: SZQUEWJRBJDHSM-UHFFFAOYSA-N; InChI=1/Fe.3NO3.9H2O/c;3*2-1(3)4;;;;;;;;;/h;;;;9*1H2/q+3;3*-1;;;;;;;;; Key: SZQUEWJRBJDHSM-UHFFFAOYAC
- SMILES: [N+](=O)([O-])[O-].[N+](=O)([O-])[O-].[N+](=O)([O-])[O-].[Fe+3]

Properties
Chemical formula	Fe(NO_{3})_{3}
Molar mass	403.999 g/mol (nonahydrate); 241.86 g/mol (anhydrous)
Appearance	Pale violet crystals hygroscopic
Density	1.68 g/cm^{3} (hexahydrate); 1.6429 g/cm^{3}(nonahydrate)
Melting point	47.2 °C (117.0 °F; 320.3 K) (nonahydrate)
Boiling point	125 °C (257 °F; 398 K) (nonahydrate)
Solubility in water	150 g/100 mL (hexahydrate)
Solubility	soluble in alcohol, acetone
Magnetic susceptibility (χ)	+15,200.0·10^{−6} cm^{3}/mol

Structure
Coordination geometry	octahedral

Hazards
- GHS labelling
Pictograms	
Signal word	Warning
Hazard statements	H272, H302, H319
Precautionary statements	P210, P220, P221, P264, P270, P280, P301+P312, P305+P351+P338, P330, P337+P313, P370+P378, P501
NFPA 704 (fire diamond)	1 0 0 OX
Flash point	non-flammable
- NIOSH (US health exposure limits)
REL (Recommended)	TWA 1 mg/m^{3}

Related compounds
Other anions	Iron(III) chloride Iron(III) sulfate
Related compounds	Iron(II) nitrate
- Except where otherwise noted, data are given for materials in their standard state (at 25 °C [77 °F], 100 kPa). verify (what is ?) Infobox references

Iron(III) nitrate, or ferric nitrate, is the name used for a series of inorganic compounds with the formula Fe(NO_{3})_{3}^{.}(H_{2}O)_{n}. Most common is the nonahydrate Fe(NO_{3})_{3}^{.}(H_{2}O)_{9}. The hydrates are all pale colored, water-soluble paramagnetic salts.

== Hydrates ==
Iron(III) nitrate is deliquescent, and it is commonly found as the nonahydrate Fe(NO_{3})_{3}·9H_{2}O, which forms colourless to pale violet crystals. This compound is the trinitrate salt of the aquo complex [Fe(H_{2}O)_{6}]^{3+}. Other hydrates Fe(NO_{3})_{3}·xH_{2}O, include:

- tetrahydrate (x=4), more precisely triaqua dinitratoiron(III) nitrate monohydrate, [Fe(NO_{3})_{2}(H_{2}O)_{3}]NO_{3}·H_{2}O, has complex cations wherein Fe^{3+} is coordinated with two nitrate anions as bidentate ligands and three of the four water molecules, in a pentagonal bipyramid configuration with two water molecules at the poles.
- pentahydrate (x=5), more precisely penta-aqua nitratoiron(III) dinitrate, [Fe(NO_{3})(H_{2}O)_{5}](NO_{3})_{2}, in which the Fe^{3+} ion is coordinated to five water molecules and a unidentate nitrate anion ligand in octahedral configuration.
- hexahydrate (x=6), more precisely hexaaquairon(III) trinitrate, [Fe(H_{2}O)_{6}](NO_{3})_{3}, where the Fe^{3+} ion is coordinated to six water molecules in octahedral configuration.

== Reactions ==
Iron(III) nitrate is a useful precursor to other iron compounds because the nitrate is easily removed or decomposed. It is for example, a standard precursor to potassium ferrate K_{2}FeO_{4}.

When dissolved, iron(III) nitrate forms yellow solutions. When this solution is heated to near boiling, nitric acid evaporates and a solid precipitate of iron(III) oxide Fe_{2}O_{3} appears. Another method for producing iron oxides from this nitrate salt involves neutralizing its aqueous solutions.

== Preparation ==
The compound can be prepared by treating iron metal powder with nitric acid, as summarized by the following idealized equation:

Fe + 4 HNO_{3} + 7 H_{2}O → Fe(NO_{3})_{3}(H_{2}O)_{9} + NO

== Applications ==
Ferric nitrate has no large scale applications. It is a catalyst for the synthesis of sodium amide from a solution of sodium in ammonia:

2 NH_{3} + 2Na → 2 NaNH_{2} + H_{2}

Certain clays impregnated with ferric nitrate have been shown to be useful oxidants in organic synthesis. For example, ferric nitrate on Montmorillonite—a reagent called Clayfen—has been employed for the oxidation of alcohols to aldehydes and thiols to disulfides.

Ferric nitrate solutions are used by jewelers and metalsmiths to etch silver and silver alloys.
