= Zinc nitrate =

- Zinc nitrate

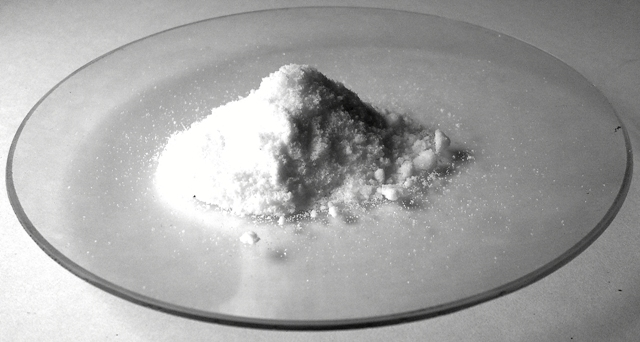

Names
- IUPAC name Zinc nitrate
- Other names Zinc dinitrate

Identifiers
CAS Number	7779-88-6; 19154-63-3 (tetrahydrate); 10196-18-6 (hexahydrate)
3D model (JSmol)	Interactive image
ChEBI	CHEBI:231504
ChemSpider	22926
ECHA InfoCard	100.029.038
EC Number	231-943-8
PubChem CID	24518
RTECS number	ZH4772000
UNII	EDO66F5U49
UN number	1514
CompTox Dashboard (EPA)	DTXSID10890636
- InChI: InChI=1S/2NO3.Zn/c2*2-1(3)4;/q2*-1;+2 Key: ONDPHDOFVYQSGI-UHFFFAOYSA-N; InChI=1/2NO3.Zn/c2*2-1(3)4;/q2*-1;+2 Key: ONDPHDOFVYQSGI-UHFFFAOYAQ
- SMILES: [N+](=O)([O-])[O-].[N+](=O)([O-])[O-].[Zn+2]

Properties
Chemical formula	Zn(NO_{3})_{2}
Molar mass	189.36 g/mol (anhydrous); 297.49 g/mol (hexahydrate)
Appearance	colorless, deliquescent crystals
Density	2.065 g/cm^{3} (hexahydrate)
Melting point	110 °C (230 °F; 383 K) (anhydrous); 45.5 °C (trihydrate); 36.4 °C (hexahydrate)
Boiling point	~ 125 °C (257 °F; 398 K) decomposes (hexahydrate)
Solubility in water	327 g/(100 mL), 40 °C (trihydrate); 184.3 g/(100 mL), 20 °C (hexahydrate)
Solubility	very soluble in alcohol
Magnetic susceptibility (χ)	−63.0·10^{−6} cm^{3}/mol

Hazards
- Occupational safety and health (OHS/OSH)
Main hazards	Oxidant, may explode on heating
- GHS labelling
Pictograms	(GHS03: Oxidizing) (GHS07: Exclamation mark)
Flash point	Non-flammable
Safety data sheet (SDS)	ICSC 1206

Related compounds
Other anions	Zinc sulfate Zinc chloride
Other cations	Cadmium nitrate Mercury(II) nitrate
Related compounds	Copper(II) nitrate
- Except where otherwise noted, data are given for materials in their standard state (at 25 °C [77 °F], 100 kPa). verify (what is ?) Infobox references

Zinc nitrate is an inorganic chemical compound with the formula Zn(NO_{3})_{2}. This colorless, crystalline salt is highly deliquescent. It is typically encountered as a hexahydrate Zn(NO_{3})_{2}·6H_{2}O. It is soluble in both water and alcohol.

== Synthesis ==
Zinc nitrate is usually prepared by dissolving zinc metal, zinc oxide, or related materials in nitric acid:

Zn + 2 HNO_{3} → Zn(NO_{3})_{2} + H_{2}
ZnO + 2 HNO_{3} → Zn(NO_{3})_{2} + H_{2}O

These reactions are accompanied by the hydration of the zinc nitrate.

The anhydrous salt arises by the reaction of anhydrous zinc chloride with nitrogen dioxide:

ZnCl_{2} + 4 NO_{2} → Zn(NO_{3})_{2} + 2 NOCl

== Reactions ==
Treatment of zinc nitrate with acetic anhydride gives zinc acetate.

On heating, zinc nitrate undergoes thermal decomposition to form zinc oxide, nitrogen dioxide and oxygen:

2 Zn(NO_{3})_{2} → 2 ZnO + 4 NO_{2} + 1 O_{2}

Aqueous zinc nitrate contains aquo complexes [Zn(H_{2}O)_{6}]^{2+} and [Zn(H_{2}O)_{4}]^{2+}. and, thus, this reaction may be better written as the reaction of the aquated ion with hydroxide through donation of a proton, as follows. In addition, Zinc Nitrate can be the precursor for a multitude zinc compound via the double displacement reaction.

== Applications ==
Zinc nitrate has no large scale application but is used on a laboratory scale for the synthesis of coordination polymers. Its controlled decomposition to zinc oxide has also been used for the generation of various ZnO based structures, including nanowires.

It is used as a corrosion inhibitor.

It can be used as a mordant in dyeing. An example reaction gives a precipitate of zinc carbonate:

Zn(NO_{3})_{2} + Na_{2}CO_{3} → ZnCO_{3} + 2 NaNO_{3}
