= Cobalt(II) sulfate =

Inorganic compound

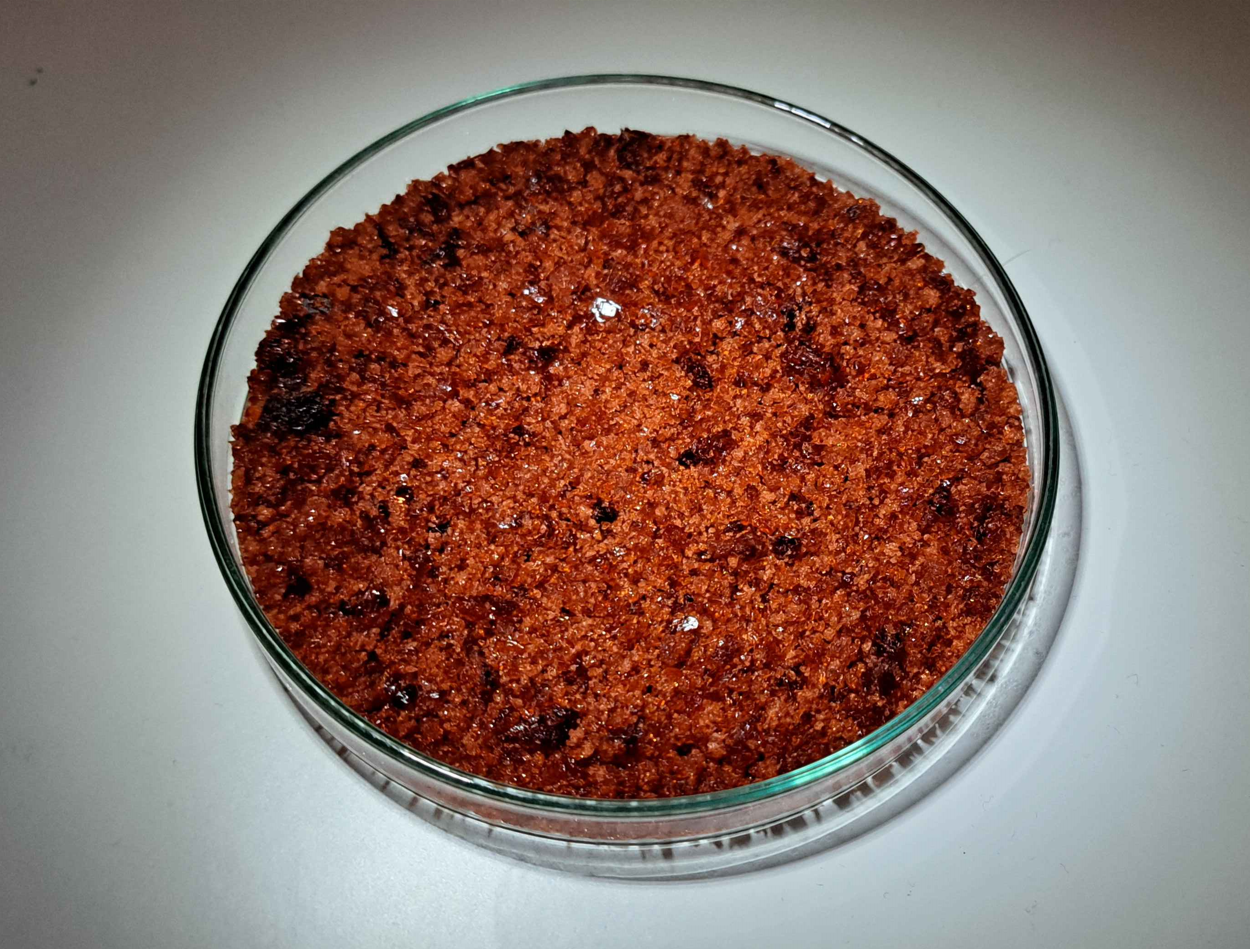

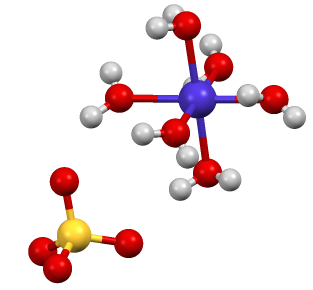
- Cobalt(II) sulfate Xray

Names
- IUPAC name Cobalt(II) sulfate
- Other names Cobaltous sulfate

Identifiers
CAS Number	10124-43-3; 13455-34-0 (monohydrate); 10026-24-1 (heptahydrate)
3D model (JSmol)	anhydrous: Interactive image; hexahydrate: Interactive image; heptahydrate: Interactive image
ChEBI	CHEBI:53470
ChemSpider	23338
ECHA InfoCard	100.030.291
EC Number	233-334-2
KEGG	C17383; C19215 (heptahydrate)
PubChem CID	24965
RTECS number	GG3100000 (anhydrous) GG3200000 (heptahydrate)
UNII	H7965X29HX; Y8N698ZE0T (heptahydrate)
CompTox Dashboard (EPA)	DTXSID1031042
- InChI: InChI=1S/Co.H2O4S/c;1-5(2,3)4/h;(H2,1,2,3,4)/q+2;/p-2 Key: KTVIXTQDYHMGHF-UHFFFAOYSA-L; InChI=1/Co.H2O4S/c;1-5(2,3)4/h;(H2,1,2,3,4)/q+2;/p-2 Key: KTVIXTQDYHMGHF-NUQVWONBAJ
- SMILES: anhydrous: [Co+2].[O-]S([O-])(=O)=O; hexahydrate: [OH2+][Co-4]([OH2+])([OH2+])([OH2+])([OH2+])[OH2+].[O-]S(=O)(=O)[O-]; heptahydrate: [OH2+][Co-4]([OH2+])([OH2+])([OH2+])([OH2+])[OH2+].[O-]S(=O)(=O)[O-].O

Properties
Chemical formula	CoSO_{4}·(H_{2}O)_{n} (n=0,1,6,7)
Molar mass	154.996 g/mol (anhydrous); 173.011 g/mol (monohydrate); 263.08 g/mol (hexahydrate); 281.103 g/mol (heptahydrate)
Appearance	reddish crystalline (anhydrous, monohydrate) pink salt (hexahydrate)
Odor	odorless (heptahydrate)
Density	3.71 g/cm^{3} (anhydrous); 3.075 g/cm^{3} (monohydrate); 2.019 g/cm^{3} (hexahydrate); 1.948 g/cm^{3} (heptahydrate)
Melting point	735 °C (1,355 °F; 1,008 K)
Solubility in water	anhydrous: 36.2 g/100 mL (20 °C); 38.3 g/100 mL (25 °C); 84 g/100 mL (100 °C) heptahydrate: 60.4 g/100 mL (3 °C); 67 g/100 mL (70 °C)
Solubility	anhydrous: 1.04 g/100 mL (methanol, 18 °C) insoluble in ammonia heptahydrate: 54.5 g/100 mL (methanol, 18 °C)
Magnetic susceptibility (χ)	+10,000·10^{−6} cm^{3}/mol
Refractive index (n_{D})	1.639 (monohydrate); 1.540 (hexahydrate); 1.483 (heptahydrate)

Structure
Crystal structure	orthorhombic (anhydrous) monoclinic (monohydrate, heptahydrate)

Hazards
- GHS labelling
Pictograms	(GHS07: Exclamation mark) (GHS08: Health hazard) (GHS09: Environmental hazard)
Signal word	Danger
Hazard statements	H302, H317, H334, H341, H350, H360, H410
Precautionary statements	P201, P202, P261, P264, P270, P272, P273, P280, P281, P285, P301+P312, P302+P352, P304+P341, P308+P313, P321, P330, P333+P313, P342+P311, P363, P391, P405, P501
NFPA 704 (fire diamond)	2 0 0
Flash point	Non-flammable
- Lethal dose or concentration (LD, LC)
LD_{50} (median dose)	424 mg/kg (oral, rat)
Safety data sheet (SDS)	ICSC 1396 (heptahydrate)
- Except where otherwise noted, data are given for materials in their standard state (at 25 °C [77 °F], 100 kPa). verify (what is ?) Infobox references

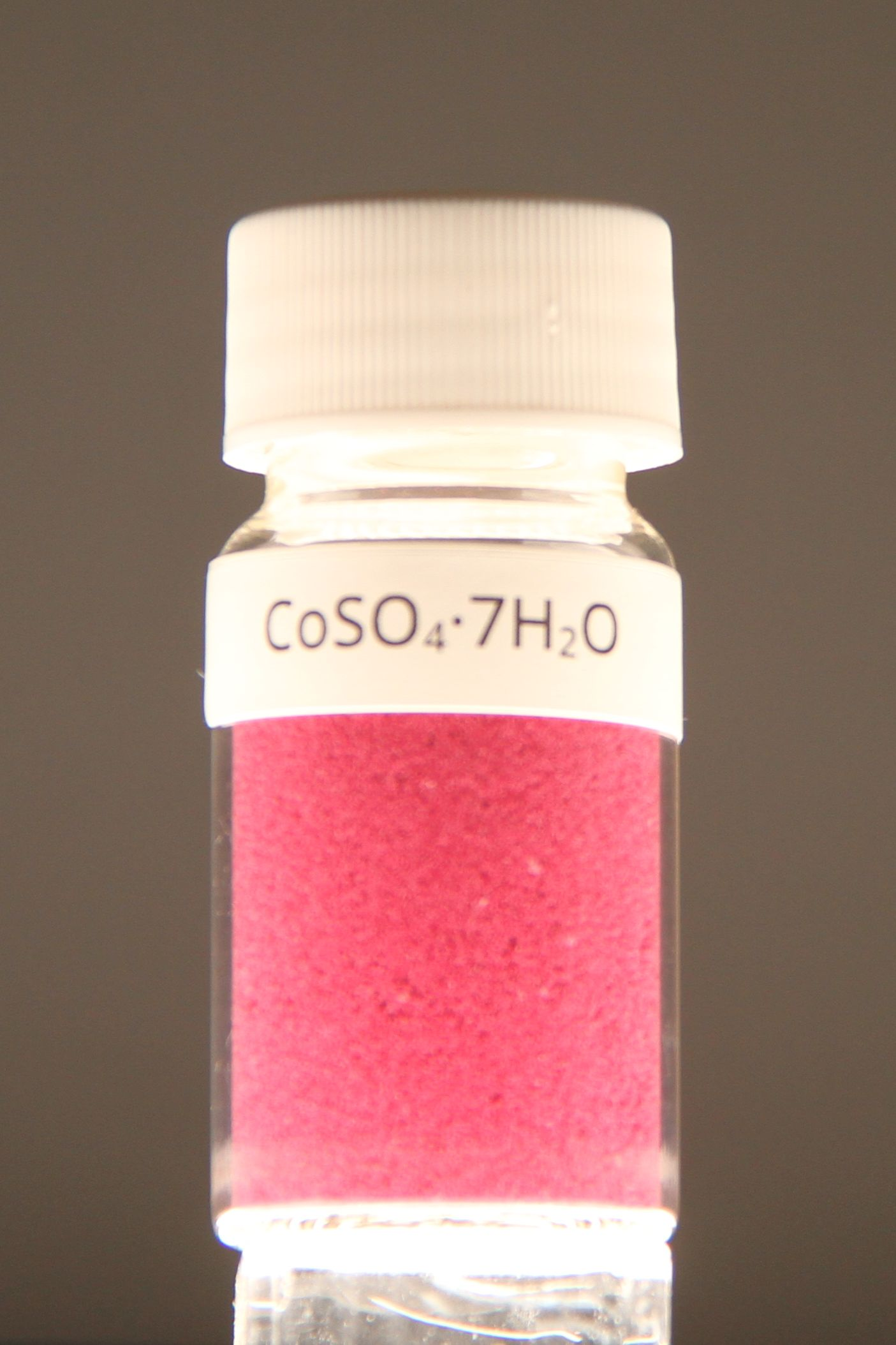
Cobalt(II) sulfate heptahydrate

Cobalt(II) sulfate is any of the inorganic compounds with the formula CoSO_{4}(H_{2}O)_{x}. Usually cobalt sulfate refers to the hexa- or heptahydrates CoSO_{4}^{.}6H_{2}O or CoSO_{4}^{.}7H_{2}O, respectively. The heptahydrate is a red solid that is soluble in water and methanol. Since cobalt(II) has an odd number of electrons, its salts are paramagnetic.

== Preparation, and structure ==
It forms by the reaction of metallic cobalt, its oxide, hydroxide, or carbonate with aqueous sulfuric acid:

Co + H_{2}SO_{4} + 7 H_{2}O → CoSO_{4}(H_{2}O)_{7} + H_{2}
CoO + H_{2}SO_{4} + 6 H_{2}O → CoSO_{4}(H_{2}O)_{7}

The heptahydrate is only stable at humidity >70% at room temperature, otherwise it converts to the hexahydrate. The hexahydrate converts to the monohydrate and the anhydrous forms at 100 and 250 °C, respectively.

CoSO_{4}(H_{2}O)_{7} → CoSO_{4}(H_{2}O)_{6} + H_{2}O
CoSO_{4}(H_{2}O)_{6} → CoSO_{4}(H_{2}O) + 5 H_{2}O
CoSO_{4}(H_{2}O) → CoSO_{4} + H_{2}O

The hexahydrate is a metal aquo complex consisting of octahedral [Co(H_{2}O)_{6}]^{2+} ions associated with sulfate anions (see image in table). The monoclinic heptahydrate has also been characterized by X-ray crystallography. It also features [Co(H_{2}O)_{6}]^{2+} octahedra as well as one water of crystallization.

== Uses and reactions ==
Cobalt sulfates are important intermediates in the extraction of cobalt from its ores. Thus, crushed, partially refined ores are treated with sulfuric acid to give red-colored solutions containing cobalt sulfate.

Hydrated cobalt(II) sulfate is used in the preparation of pigments, as well as in the manufacture of other cobalt salts. Cobalt pigment is used in porcelains and glass. Cobalt(II) sulfate is used in storage batteries and electroplating baths, sympathetic inks, and as an additive to soils and animal feeds. For these purposes, the cobalt sulfate is produced by treating cobalt oxide with sulfuric acid.

Being commonly available commercially, the heptahydrate is a routine source of cobalt in coordination chemistry.

== Natural occurrence ==
Rarely, cobalt(II) sulfate is found in form of few crystallohydrate minerals, occurring among oxidation zones containing primary Co minerals (like skutterudite or cobaltite). These minerals are: biebierite (heptahydrate), moorhouseite (Co,Ni,Mn)SO_{4}^{.}6H_{2}O, aplowite (Co,Mn,Ni)SO_{4}^{.}4H_{2}O and cobaltkieserite (monohydrate).

== Health issues ==
Cobalt is an essential mineral for mammals, but more than a few micrograms per day is harmful. Although poisonings have rarely resulted from cobalt compounds, their chronic ingestion has caused serious health problems at doses far less than the lethal dose. In 1965, the addition of a cobalt compound to stabilize beer foam in Canada led to a peculiar form of toxin-induced cardiomyopathy, which came to be known as beer drinker's cardiomyopathy.

Furthermore, cobalt(II) sulfate is suspected of causing cancer (i.e., possibly carcinogenic, IARC Group 2B) as per the International Agency for Research on Cancer (IARC) Monographs.

== Related compounds ==
- the Tutton salt K_{2}Co(SO_{4})_{2} · 6 H_{2}O
