= C8H10O =

The molecular formula C_{8}H_{10}O may refer to:

- Ethylphenols
  - 2-Ethylphenol
  - 3-Ethylphenol
  - 4-Ethylphenol
- Ethyl phenyl ether
- Methoxytoluenes (methylanisoles)
- Methylenomycin B
- Phenethyl alcohol (2-phenylethanol)
- 1-Phenylethanol
- Xylenols
  - 2,3-Xylenol
  - 2,4-Xylenol
  - 2,5-Xylenol
  - 2,6-Xylenol
  - 3,4-Xylenol
  - 3,5-Xylenol
