= Phenols =

Chemical compounds in which hydroxyl group is attached directly to an aromatic ring

In organic chemistry, phenols, sometimes called phenolics, are a class of chemical compounds consisting of one or more hydroxyl groups (−OH) bonded directly to an aromatic hydrocarbon group. The simplest is phenol, C_{6}H_{5}OH. Phenolic compounds are classified as simple phenols or polyphenols based on the number of phenol units in the molecule.

Phenol – the simplest of the phenols

Chemical structure of salicylic acid, the active metabolite of aspirin

Phenols are both synthesized industrially and produced by plants and microorganisms.

== Properties ==
=== Acidity ===
Phenols are more acidic than typical alcohols. The acidity of the hydroxyl group in phenols is commonly intermediate between that of aliphatic alcohols and carboxylic acids (their pK_{a} is usually between 10 and 12). Deprotonation of a phenol forms a corresponding negative phenolate ion or phenoxide ion, and the corresponding salts are called phenolates or phenoxides (aryloxides, according to the IUPAC Gold Book).

=== Condensation with aldehydes and ketones ===
Phenols are susceptible to electrophilic aromatic substitutions. Condensation with formaldehyde gives resinous materials, famously Bakelite.

Another industrial-scale electrophilic aromatic substitution is the production of bisphenol A, which is produced by the condensation with acetone.

=== C-Alkylation with alkenes ===
Phenol is readily alkylated at the ortho positions using alkenes in the presence of a Lewis acid such as aluminium phenoxide:

CH_{2}=CR_{2} + C_{6}H_{5}OH → R_{2}CHCH_{2}-2-C_{6}H_{4}OH

More than 100,000 tons of tert-butyl phenols are produced annually (year: 2000) in this way, using isobutylene (CH_{2}=CMe_{2}) as the alkylating agent. Especially important is 2,6-ditert-butylphenol, a versatile antioxidant.

=== Other reactions ===
Phenols undergo esterification. Phenol esters are active esters, being prone to hydrolysis. Phenols are reactive species toward oxidation. Oxidative cleavage, for instance cleavage of 1,2-dihydroxybenzene to the monomethylester of 2,4-hexadienedioic acid with oxygen, copper chloride in pyridine. Oxidative de-aromatization to quinones also known as the Teuber reaction. Oxidizing reagents are Fremy's salt and oxone. In reaction depicted below 3,4,5-trimethylphenol reacts with singlet oxygen generated from oxone/sodium carbonate in an acetonitrile/water mixture to a para-peroxyquinole. This hydroperoxide is reduced to the quinole with sodium thiosulfate.

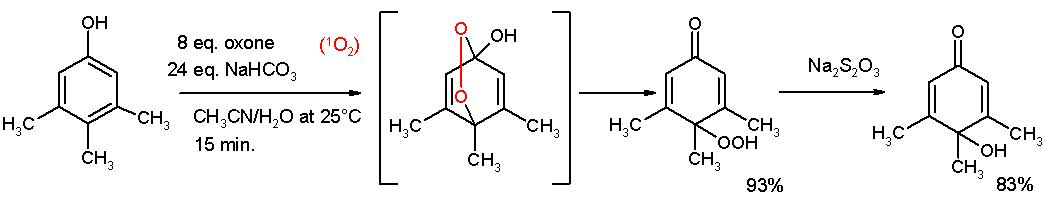

Phenols are oxidized to hydroquinones in the Elbs persulfate oxidation.

Reaction of naphtols and hydrazines and sodium bisulfite in the Bucherer carbazole synthesis.

== Synthesis ==
Many phenols of commercial interest are prepared by elaboration of phenol or cresols. They are typically produced by the alkylation of benzene/toluene with propylene to form cumene then O_{2} is added with H_{2}SO_{4} to form phenol (Hock process). In addition to the reactions above, many other more specialized reactions produce phenols:

- rearrangement of esters in the Fries rearrangement
- rearrangement of N-phenylhydroxylamines in the Bamberger rearrangement
- dealkylation of phenolic ethers
- reduction of quinones
- replacement of an aromatic amine by an hydroxyl group with water and sodium bisulfide in the Bucherer reaction
- thermal decomposition of aryl diazonium salts, the salts are converted to phenol
- by the oxidation of aryl silanes—an aromatic variation of the Fleming-Tamao oxidation
- catalytic synthesis from aryl bromides and iodides using nitrous oxide

== Classification ==
There are various classification schemes. A commonly used scheme is based on the number of carbons and was devised by Jeffrey Harborne and Simmonds in 1964 and published in 1980:

Phenol	the parent compound, used as a disinfectant and for chemical synthesis
Bisphenol A	and other bisphenols produced from ketones and phenol/cresol
BHT	(butylated hydroxytoluene) – a fat-soluble antioxidant and food additive
4-Nonylphenol	a breakdown product of detergents and nonoxynol-9
Orthophenyl phenol	a fungicide used for waxing citrus fruits
Picric acid	(trinitrophenol) – an explosive material
Phenolphthalein	pH indicator
Xylenol	used in antiseptics & disinfectants

=== Drugs and bioactive natural products ===
The best-selling drug in the U.S., acetaminophen, also known as paracetamol, is a phenol.

More than 371 drugs approved by the FDA between the years of 1951 and 2020 contain either a phenol or a phenolic ether (a phenol with an alkyl), with nearly every class of small molecule drugs being represented, and natural products making up a large portion of this list.

tyrosine	one of the 20 standard amino acids
L-DOPA	dopamine prodrug used to treat Parkinson's disease
propofol	short-acting intravenous anesthetic agent
vitamin K hydroquinone	blood-clotting agent that converts
levothyroxine (l-thyroxine)	top-selling drug to treat thyroid hormone deficiency
amoxicillin	top-selling antibiotic
estradiol	the major female sex hormone

== Analysis ==
In chemical analysis, phenols can be detected using 2,6‑dibromoquinonechlorimide. It reacts with phenols to form indophenols, resulting in a color change.
