= Tin acetate =

There are two tin acetates:

- Tin(II) acetate, (CH_{3}CO_{2})_{2}Sn
- Tin(IV) acetate, (CH_{3}CO_{2})_{4}Sn
