= Tin(IV) acetate =

Names
- Other names Tin(IV) acetate Tin tetraacetate

Identifiers
CAS Number	2800-96-6
3D model (JSmol)	Interactive image
ChemSpider	8039142
ECHA InfoCard	100.157.007
EC Number	628-765-1
PubChem CID	9863446
CompTox Dashboard (EPA)	DTXSID10432055
- InChI: InChI=1S/4C2H4O2.Sn/c4*1-2(3)4;/h4*1H3,(H,3,4);/q;;;;+4/p-4 Key: YJGJRYWNNHUESM-UHFFFAOYSA-J
- SMILES: CC(=O)[O-].CC(=O)[O-].CC(=O)[O-].CC(=O)[O-].[Sn+4]

Properties
Chemical formula	Sn(CH_{3}COO)_{4}
Molar mass	354.886 g·mol^{−1}
Appearance	white needles
Melting point	242 °C (468 °F; 515 K)

Hazards
- GHS labelling
Pictograms	(GHS07: Exclamation mark)
Signal word	Warning
Hazard statements	H302, H312, H332
Precautionary statements	P261, P264, P270, P271, P280, P301+P317, P302+P352, P304+P340, P317, P321, P330, P362+P364, P501

Related compounds
Other anions	Tin(IV) fluoroacetate
Other cations	Lead(IV) acetate
Related compounds	Tin(II) acetate
- Except where otherwise noted, data are given for materials in their standard state (at 25 °C [77 °F], 100 kPa). Infobox references

Tin(IV) acetate, also known as stannic acetate, is the tin(IV) salt of acetic acid, with the chemical formula of Sn(CH_{3}COO)_{4}.

== Preparation ==
Tin(IV) acetate can be refluxed by thallium acetate and tin(IV) iodide in acetic anhydride. After the reaction is completed, the solution is concentrated and cooled to precipitate crystals, which are washed with anhydrous ether and dried in vacuum:

4 CH_{3}COOTl + SnI_{4} → Sn(CH_{3}COO)_{4} + 4 TlI↓

Tetraphenyltin is refluxed at 120 °C in acetic acid–acetic anhydride mixture, and tin(IV) acetate can be quantitatively generated:

4 CH_{3}COOH + (C_{6}H_{5})_{4}Sn → Sn(CH_{3}COO)_{4} + 4 C_{6}H_{6}

The reaction of tin(IV) nitrate with acetic acid and acetic anhydride can also produce tin(IV) acetate, but the reaction with trifluoroacetic anhydride can not get its analogue, but [NO^{+}_{2}]_{2}[Sn(CF_{3}COO)_{6}]^{2−} (nitronium hexaacetatotin(IV)).

4 CH_{3}COOH + Sn(NO_{3})_{4} → Sn(CH_{3}COO)_{4} + 4 HNO_{3}

== Properties ==
Tin(IV) acetate decomposes in water to form tin hydroxide and acetic acid:

Sn(CH_{3}COO)_{4} + 4 H_{2}O → Sn(OH)_{4} + 4 CH_{3}COOH

It reacts with sulfur-containing species such as thiols to generate corresponding sulfur-containing tin compounds.

== See also ==
- Organic chemistry
- Organotin chemistry
