= Cerulean =

Shade of blue (color)

Color coordinates
- Hex triplet: #007BA7
- sRGB^{B} (r, g, b): (0, 123, 167)
- HSV (h, s, v): (196°, 100%, 65%)
- CIELCh_{uv} (L, C, h): (48, 56, 234°)
- Source: Maerz and Paul
- ISCC–NBS descriptor: Strong greenish blue
- B: Normalized to [0–255] (byte)

Cerulean (RGB)

Color coordinates
- Hex triplet: #00BFFF
- sRGB^{B} (r, g, b): (0, 191, 255)
- HSV (h, s, v): (195°, 100%, 100%)
- CIELCh_{uv} (L, C, h): (73, 83, 234°)
- ISCC–NBS descriptor: Vivid blue
- B: Normalized to [0–255] (byte)

The color cerulean (American English), or caerulean (British English, Commonwealth English), is a variety of the hue of blue that may range from a light azure blue to a more intense sky blue. Cerulean may also be mixed with the hue of green. The first recorded use of cerulean as a color name in English was in 1590. The word is derived from the Latin word caeruleus (Latin: [kaeˈruleus]), "dark blue, blue, or blue-green", which in turn probably derives from caerulum, diminutive of caelum, "heaven, sky".

"Cerulean blue" is the name of a blue-green pigment consisting of cobalt stannate (Co_{2}SnO_{4}). The pigment was first synthesized in the late eighteenth century by Albrecht Höpfner, a Swiss chemist, and it was known as Höpfner blue during the first half of the nineteenth century. Art suppliers began referring to cobalt stannate as cerulean in the second half of the nineteenth century. It was not widely used by artists until the 1870s when it became available in oil paint.

Cerulean Blue

Color coordinates
- Hex triplet: #2A52BE
- sRGB^{B} (r, g, b): (42, 82, 190)
- HSV (h, s, v): (224°, 78%, 75%)
- CIELCh_{uv} (L, C, h): (38, 90, 260°)
- Source: Maerz and Paul
- ISCC–NBS descriptor: Vivid blue
- B: Normalized to [0–255] (byte)

== Pigment characteristics ==
The primary chemical constituent of the pigment is cobalt(II) stannate (Co_{2}SnO_{4}). The pigment is a greenish-blue color. In watercolor, it has a slight chalkiness. When used in oil paint, it loses this quality.

Today, cobalt chromate is sometimes marketed under the cerulean blue name but is darker and greener (Note: Rex Art color index PB 36) than the cobalt stannate version. (Note: Rex Art color index PB 35) The chromate makes excellent turquoise colors and is identified by Rex Art and some other manufacturers as "cobalt turquoise".

Cerulean is inert with good light resistance, and it exhibits a high degree of stability in both watercolor and acrylic paint.

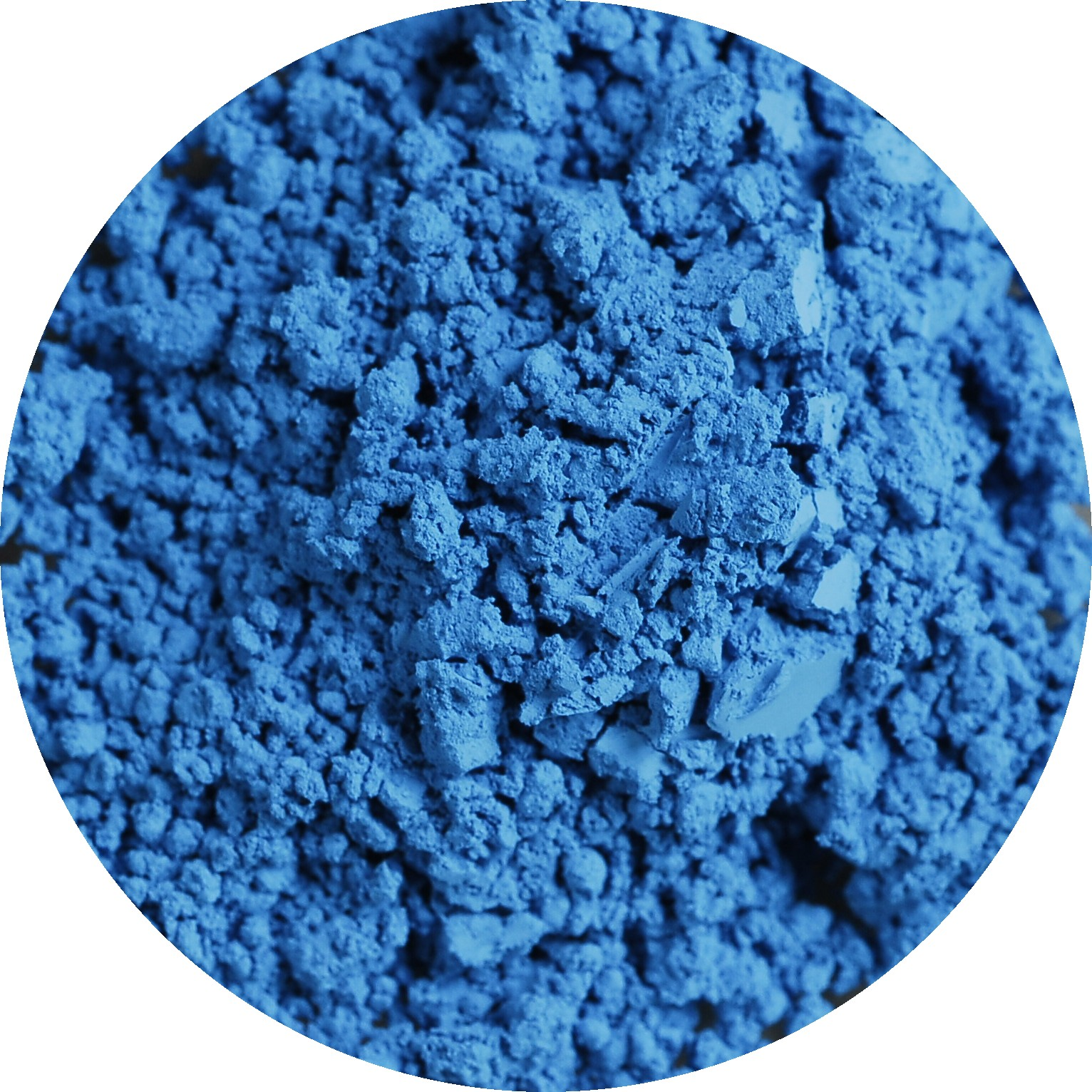
Cerulean blue PB35

A sample swatch of cerulean blue hue oil paint. "Hue" in this instance means that other pigments have been used to mimic the color of oil paint that contains the original pigment.

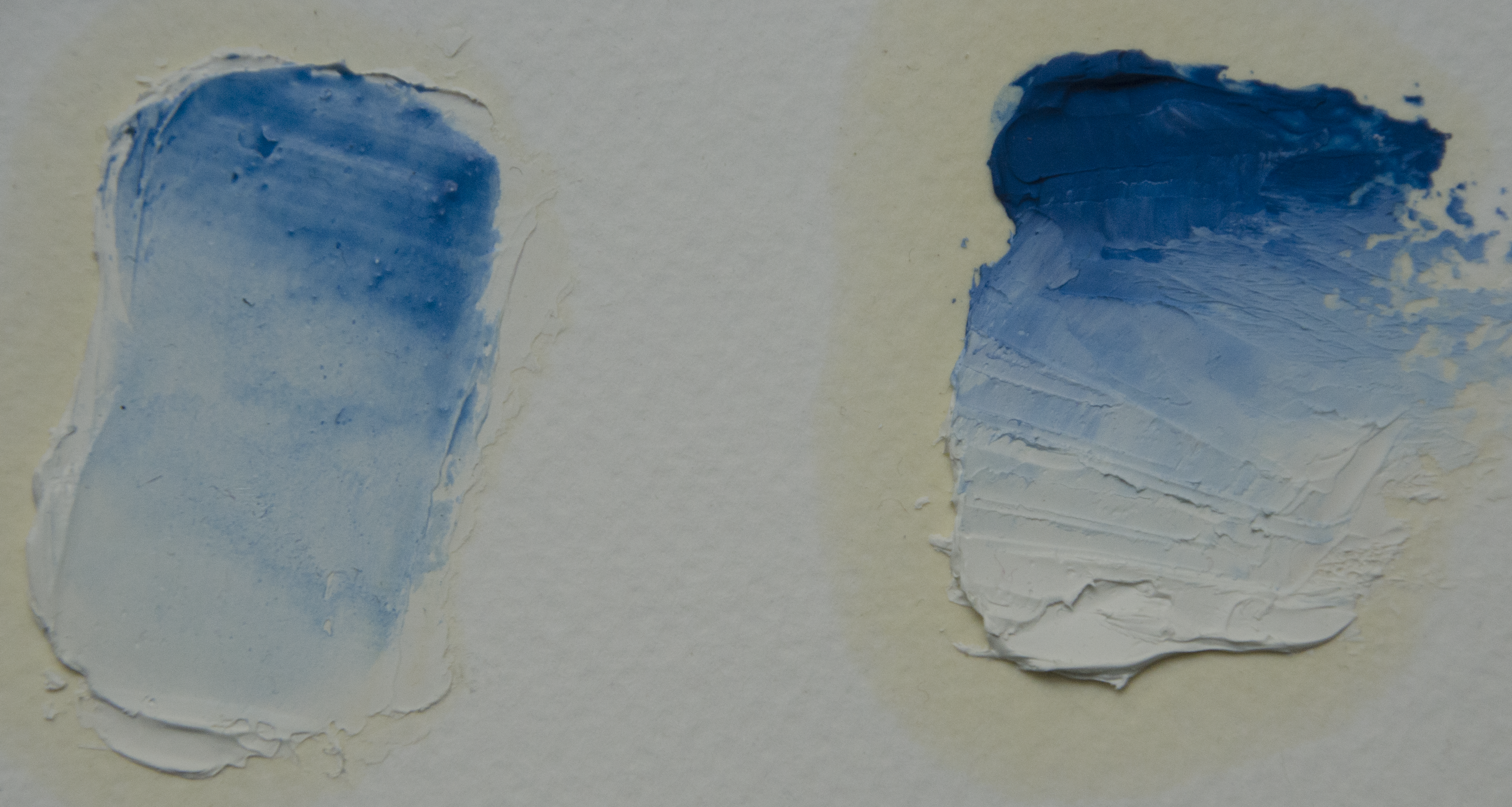
Cerulean blue pigment in oil. On the left as a standoil glaze over zinc white; on the right as a mass tone in oil-based paint.

== History ==
Cobalt stannate pigment was first synthesized in 1789 by the Swiss chemist Albrecht Höpfner by heating roasted cobalt and tin oxides together. Subsequently, there was limited German production under the name of Cölinblau. It was generally known as Höpfner blue from the late eighteenth century until the middle of the nineteenth century.

In the late 1850s, art suppliers begin referring to the pigment as "ceruleum" blue. The London Times of 28 December 1859 had an advertisement for "Caeruleum, a new permanent color prepared for the use of artists." Ure's Dictionary of Arts from 1875 describes the pigment as "Caeruleum ... consisting of stannate of protoxide of cobalt, mixed with stannic acid and sulphate of lime." Cerulean was also referred to as coeurleum, cerulium, bleu céleste (celestial blue). Other nineteenth century English pigment names included "ceruleum blue" and "corruleum blue". By 1935, Max Doerner referred to the pigment as cerulean, as do most modern sources, though ceruleum is still used.

Some sources claim that cerulean blue was first marketed in the United Kingdom by colourman George Rowney, as "coeruleum" in the early 1860s. However, the British firm of Roberson was buying "Blue No. 58 (Cerulium)" from a German firm of Frauenknecht and Stotz prior to Rowney. Cerulean blue was only available as a watercolor in the 1860s and was not widely adopted until the 1870s when it was used in oil paint. It was popular with artists including Claude Monet, Paul Signac, and Picasso. Van Gogh created his own approximation of cerulean blue using a mixture of cobalt blue, cadmium yellow, and white.

== In popular culture ==
An iconic scene in the film The Devil Wears Prada depicts Miranda Priestly (Meryl Streep) explaining the influence of the fashion industry on consumer choices of colors. In the monologue, she dissects Andrea Sachs's (Anne Hathaway) seemingly ordinary blue sweater, highlighting its "cerulean" color. The sequence, often referred to as the "cerulean sweater speech", is widely cited as an illustration of how fashion trends move from the runway to the mass market.Cerulean was named the first-ever Pantone Color of the Year, chosen for the year 2000.

== Notable occurrences ==
In 1877, Monet had added the pigment to his palette, using it in a painting from his series La Gare Saint-Lazare (now in the National Gallery, London). The blues in the painting include cobalt and cerulean blue, with some areas of ultramarine. Laboratory analysis conducted by the National Gallery identified a relatively pure example of cerulean blue pigment in the shadows of the station's canopy. Researchers at the National Gallery suggested that "cerulean probably offered a pigment of sufficiently greenish tone to displace Prussian blue, which may not have been popular by this time".

Berthe Morisot painted the blue coat of the woman in her Summer's Day, 1879 in cerulean blue in conjunction with artificial ultramarine and cobalt blue.

When the United Nations was formed at the end of World War II, they adopted cerulean blue for their emblem. The designer Oliver Lundquist stated that he chose the color because it was "the opposite of red, the color of war".

In the Catholic Church, cerulean vestments are permitted on certain Marian feast days, primarily the Immaculate Conception in diocese currently or formerly under the Spanish Crown.

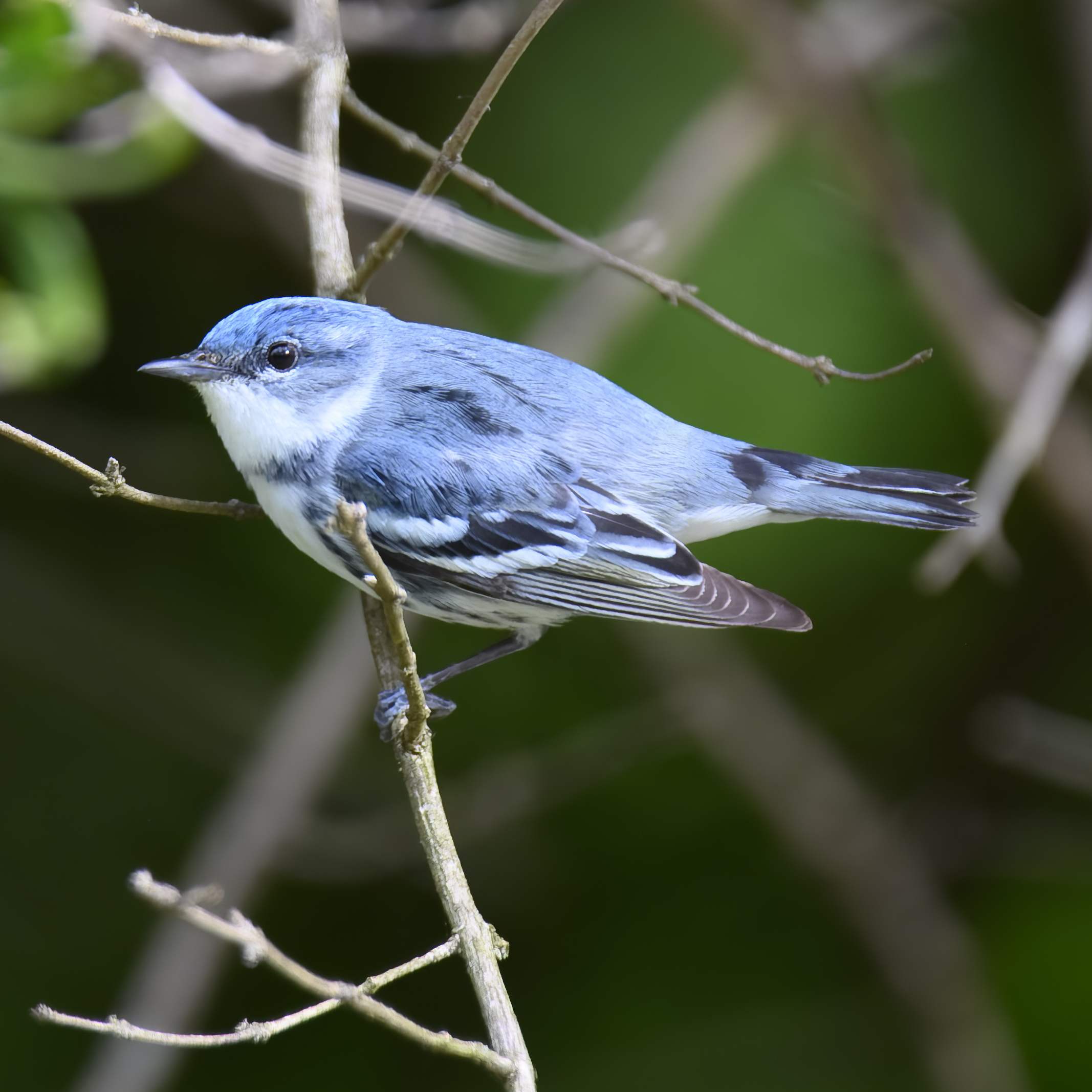
Cerulean warbler (Setophaga cerulea), named from its color

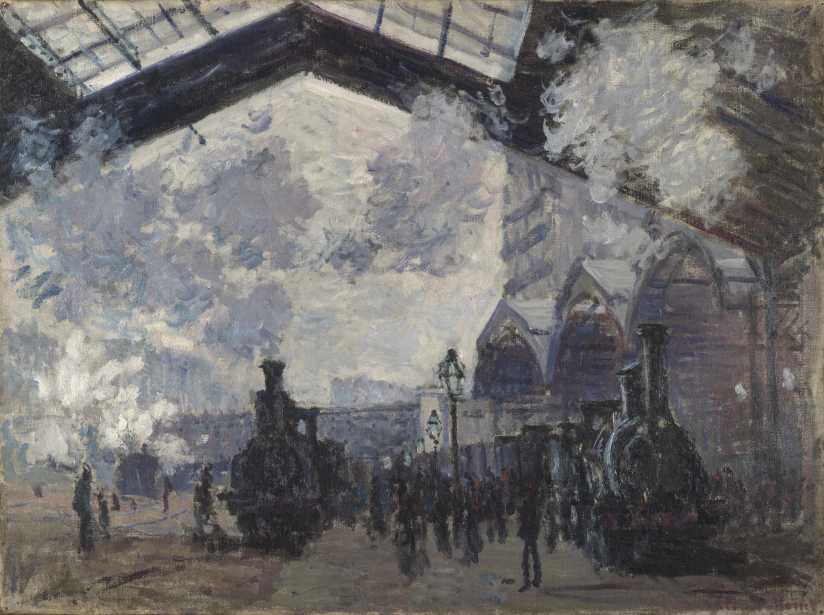
Claude Monet, La Gare Saint-Lazare, 1887

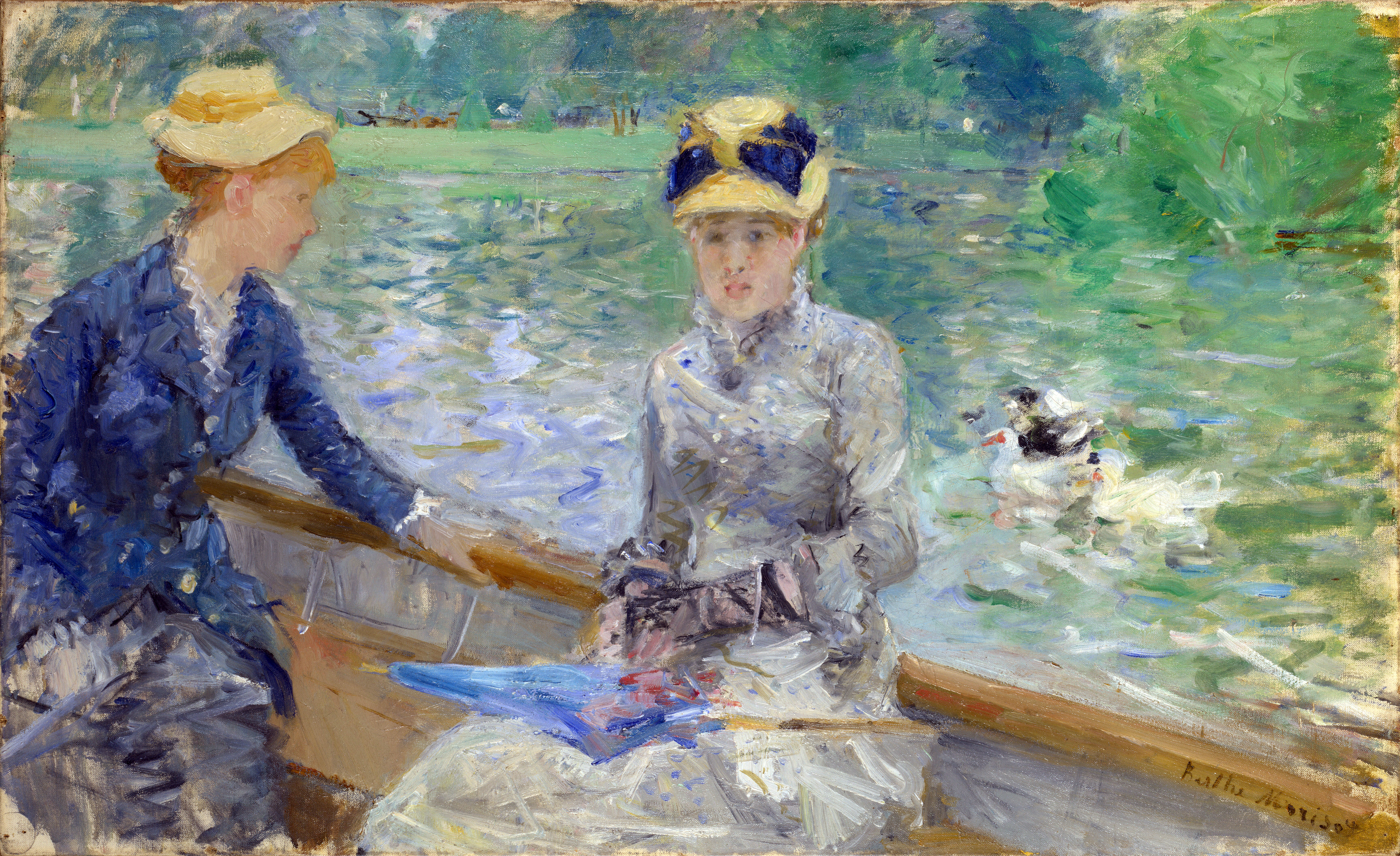
Berthe Morisot, Summer's Day, 1879

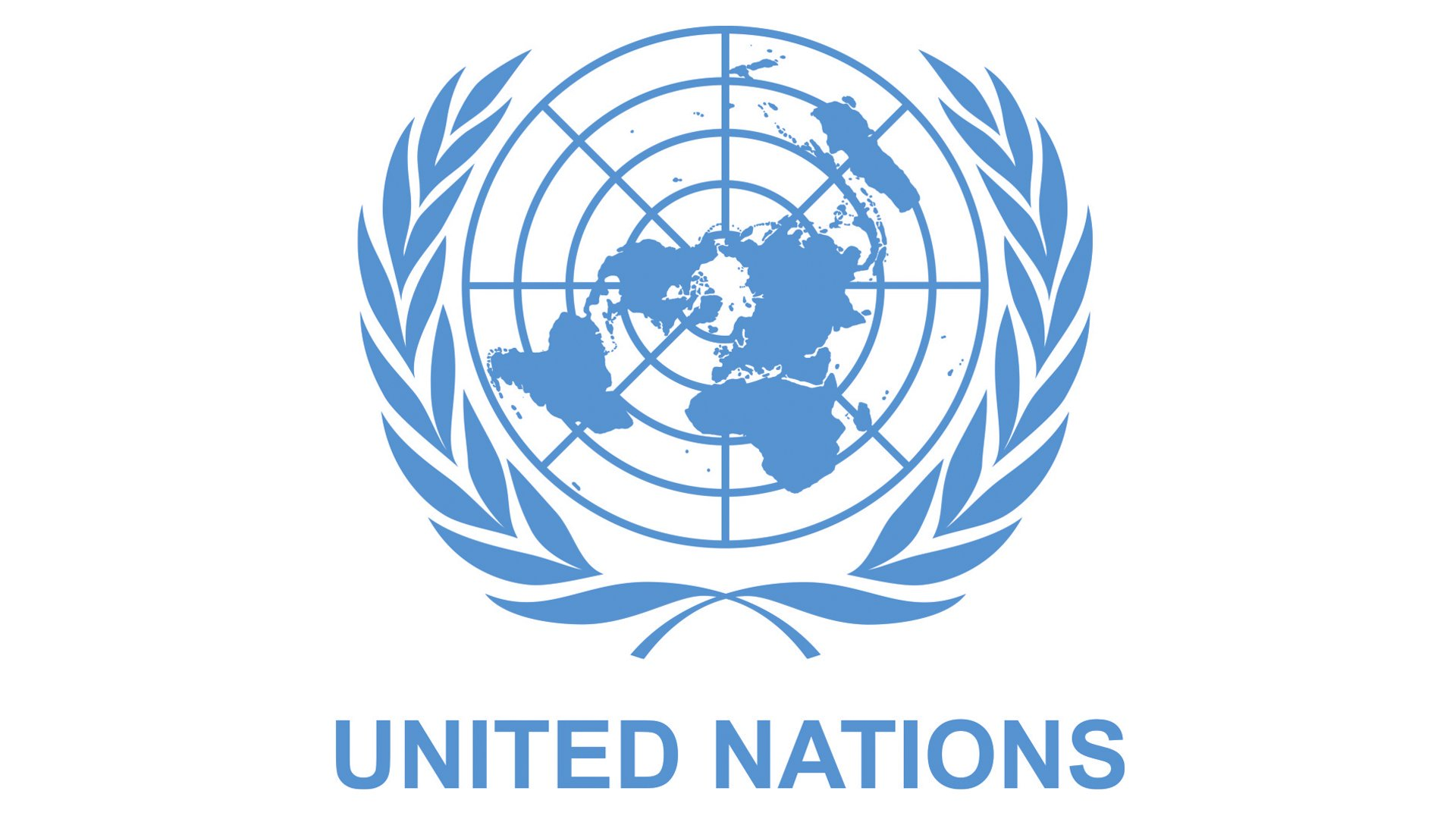
Symbol of the United Nations

== Other color variations ==
=== Pale cerulean ===
Cerulean (Pantone)

Color coordinates
- Hex triplet: #98B4D4
- sRGB^{B} (r, g, b): (152, 180, 212)
- HSV (h, s, v): (212°, 28%, 83%)
- CIELCh_{uv} (L, C, h): (72, 33, 242°)
- Source: Pantone TPX
- ISCC–NBS descriptor: Pale blue
- B: Normalized to [0–255] (byte)

Pantone, in a press release, declared the pale hue of cerulean at right, which they call cerulean, as the "color of the millennium".

The source of this color is the "Pantone Textile Paper eXtended (TPX)" color list, color #15-4020 TPX—Cerulean.

=== Cerulean (Crayola) ===
Cerulean (Crayola)

Color coordinates
- Hex triplet: #02A4D3
- sRGB^{B} (r, g, b): (2, 164, 211)
- HSV (h, s, v): (193°, 99%, 83%)
- CIELCh_{uv} (L, C, h): (63, 67, 230°)
- Source: Crayola
- ISCC–NBS descriptor: Brilliant greenish blue
- B: Normalized to [0–255] (byte)

This bright tone of cerulean is the color called cerulean by Crayola crayons.

=== Cerulean frost ===
Cerulean Frost

Color coordinates
- Hex triplet: #6D9BC3
- sRGB^{B} (r, g, b): (109, 155, 195)
- HSV (h, s, v): (208°, 44%, 76%)
- CIELCh_{uv} (L, C, h): (62, 45, 240°)
- Source: Crayola
- ISCC–NBS descriptor: Light blue
- B: Normalized to [0–255] (byte)

At right is displayed the color cerulean frost.

Cerulean frost is one of the colors in the special set of metallic colored Crayola crayons called Silver Swirls, the colors of which were formulated by Crayola in 1990.

=== Curious Blue ===
Curious Blue

Color coordinates
- Hex triplet: #269DCE
- sRGB^{B} (r, g, b): (38, 157, 206)
- HSV (h, s, v): (198°, 82%, 81%)
- CIELCh_{uv} (L, C, h): (61, 65, 233°)
- Source: hexcolor.co
- ISCC–NBS descriptor: Moderate cerulean
- B: Normalized to [0–255] (byte)

Curious Blue is one of the brighter-toned colors of cerulean.

== In nature ==
- Cerulean cuckooshrike
- Cerulean kingfisher
- Cerulean flycatcher
- Cerulean warbler
- Cerulean-capped manakin

== See also ==
- The Devil Wears Prada (film) § Cerulean sweater speech
- Pusher (The X-Files) § Plot
- List of colors
- Pigment
- Blue pigments
