= Edmond Frémy =

French chemist

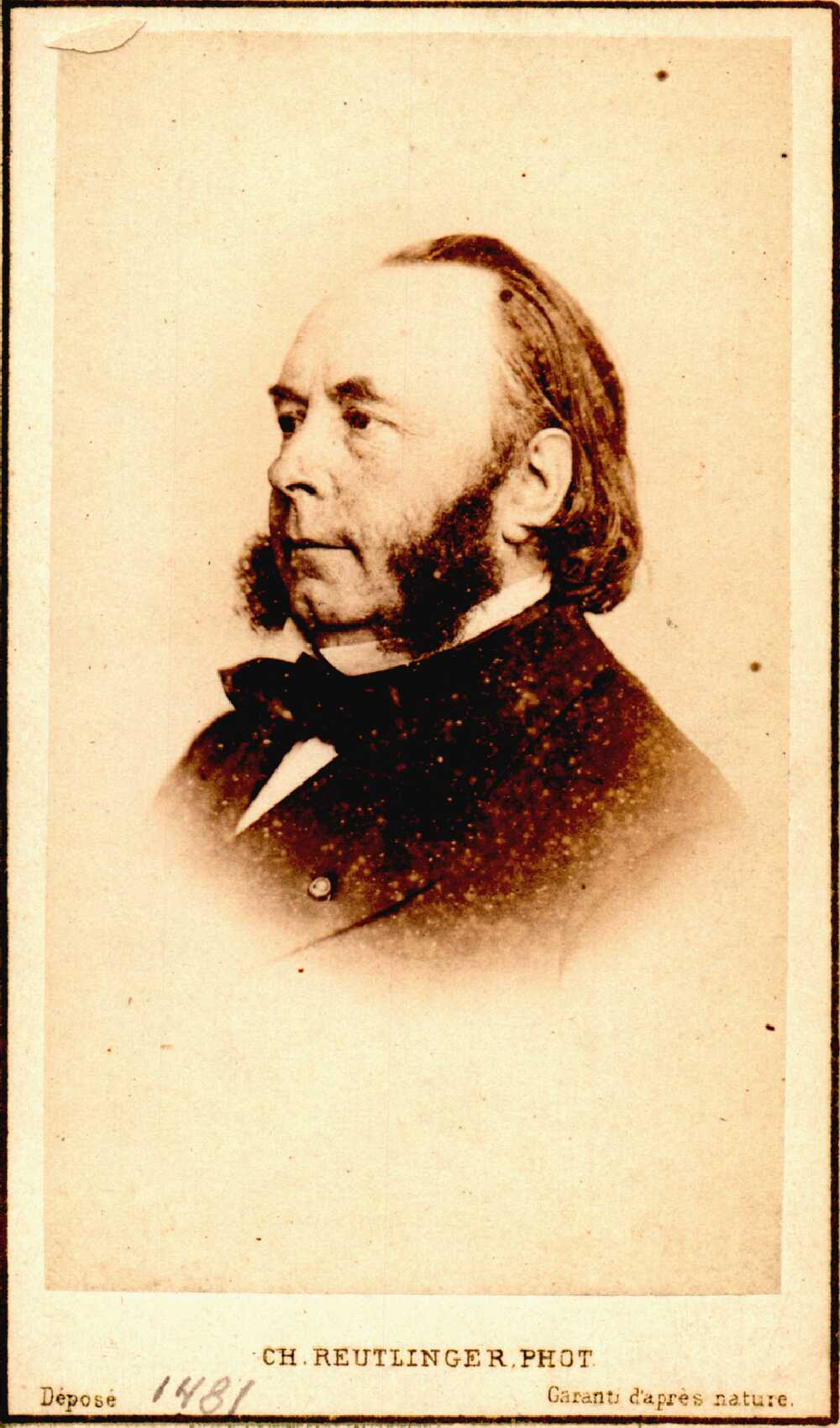
Edmond Fremy

Edmond Frémy (French: [fremi]; 28 February 1814 – 3 February 1894) was a French chemist. He is perhaps best known today for Frémy's salt, a strong oxidizing agent which he discovered in 1845. Fremy's salt is a long-lived free radical that finds use as a standard in electron paramagnetic resonance spectroscopy.

== Life ==
Frémy was born at Versailles, entered Joseph Louis Gay-Lussac's laboratory in 1831, and was employed at the École Polytechnique in 1834 and at the Collège de France in 1837. His next post was that of repetiteur at the École Polytechnique, where in 1846 he was appointed professor, and in 1850 he succeeded Gay-Lussac in the chair of chemistry at the Muséum national d'histoire naturelle, of which he later became director (1879–1891) after Michel Eugène Chevreul. He died in Paris.

== Work ==
Frémy's work included investigations of osmic acid, the ferrates, stannates, plumbates, and other oxometallates, as well as ozone; attempts to obtain free fluorine by the electrolysis of fused fluorides; and the discovery of anhydrous hydrofluoric acid and a series of acides sulphazotés, the precise nature of which long remained a matter of discussion. He also studied the coloring of leaves and flowers, the composition of bone, cerebral matter, and other animal substances, and the processes of fermentation, in which he was an opponent of Pasteur's views.

Keenly alive to the importance of the technical applications of chemistry, Frémy devoted special attention as a teacher to the training of industrial chemists. In this field he contributed to our knowledge of the manufacture of iron and steel, sulfuric acid, glass, and paper, and in particular worked at the saponification of fats with sulfuric acid and the utilization of palmitic acid for candle-making. In the later years of his life he applied himself to the problem of obtaining alumina in the I crystalline form, and succeeded in making rubies identical with the natural gem not merely in chemical composition but also in physical properties.

== Publications ==
In addition to numerous treatises in the Annales de Chimie et de Physique, he published Traité de chimie générale (7 vols., 3rd ed. 1862-65). The Encyclopédie Chimique, a work in 10 volumes, upon which he was engaged for thirteen years, was prepared by him in collaboration with several other scientists, and was completed in 1894.
