= Hordatine A =

Chemical compound

Names
- IUPAC name (2S,3S)-N-[4-(Diaminomethylideneamino)butyl]-5-[(E)-3-[4-(diaminomethylideneamino)butylamino]-3-oxoprop-1-enyl]-2-(4-hydroxyphenyl)-2,3-dihydro-1-benzofuran-3-carboxamide

Identifiers
CAS Number	7073-64-5
3D model (JSmol)	Interactive image; glucoside: Interactive image
ChEBI	CHEBI:5762
ChEMBL	ChEMBL567589
ChemSpider	24632689
KEGG	C08307
PubChem CID	45485025; glucoside: 131751024
UNII	SY4PNW8T8B
CompTox Dashboard (EPA)	DTXSID50415069
- InChI: InChI=1S/C28H38N8O4/c29-27(30)35-15-3-1-13-33-23(38)12-6-18-5-11-22-21(17-18)24(25(40-22)19-7-9-20(37)10-8-19)26(39)34-14-2-4-16-36-28(31)32/h5-12,17,24-25,37H,1-4,13-16H2,(H,33,38)(H,34,39)(H4,29,30,35)(H4,31,32,36)/b12-6+/t24-,25+/m0/s1 Key: KVYNYRIOAYQBFK-AIIPJEMGSA-N; glucoside: InChI=1S/C34H48N8O10/c35-33(36)41-13-3-1-11-39-24(45)10-5-18-15-21-25(31(49)40-12-2-4-14-42-34(37)38)29(52-30(21)22(44)16-18)19-6-8-20(9-7-19)50-32-28(48)27(47)26(46)23(17-43)51-32/h5-10,15-16,23,25-29,32,43-44,46-48H,1-4,11-14,17H2,(H,39,45)(H,40,49)(H4,35,36,41)(H4,37,38,42)/b10-5-
- SMILES: C1=CC(=CC=C1[C@@H]2[C@H](C3=C(O2)C=CC(=C3)/C=C/C(=O)NCCCCN=C(N)N)C(=O)NCCCCN=C(N)N)O; glucoside: C1=CC(=CC=C1C2C(C3=C(O2)C(=CC(=C3)C=CC(=O)NCCCCN=C(N)N)O)C(=O)NCCCCN=C(N)N)OC4C(C(C(C(O4)CO)O)O)O

Properties
Chemical formula	C_{28}H_{38}N_{8}O_{4}
Molar mass	550.664 g·mol^{−1}
- Except where otherwise noted, data are given for materials in their standard state (at 25 °C [77 °F], 100 kPa). Infobox references

Hordatine A is a phenolic secondary metabolite and an adrenergic antagonist that is found in barley. This natural product is a member of the class benzofurans, and can also be found in barley malt and beer, as it withstands moderate processing. Hordatine A is a hydroxycinnamic acid amide derivative (HCAA) as well as a dimer of coumaroyl agmatine, and is plentiful during the development of barley seedlings, specifically in the shoots. Hordatines and their hydroxycinnamoyl agmatine precursors are of interest because of their antifungal activity against plant pathogens, such as inhibiting spore germination of many fungi species. Hordatine A is thought to be a phytoanticipin, because it is observed in significant amounts in young seedlings and at early growth stages. It, along with its cis-isomer aperidine, has been found to activate the muscarinic M3 receptor; this mechanism is thought to contribute to the increase in GI motility caused by beer consumption.

== Biosynthesis ==
The first step in the biosynthesis of hordatine A is characterized by the use of the enzyme agmatine coumaroyltransferase (ACT), which catalyzes the formation of p-coumaroylagmatine from p-coumaroyl-CoA and agmatine. The second step in the biosynthesis of the natural product is characterized by the oxidative coupling of two molecules of p-coumaroylagmatine by the enzyme peroxidase. The formation of this homodimer and its observable furan ring results from the hydroxy group of one p-coumaroylagmatine molecule reacting with the ethylene double bond of the other molecule.

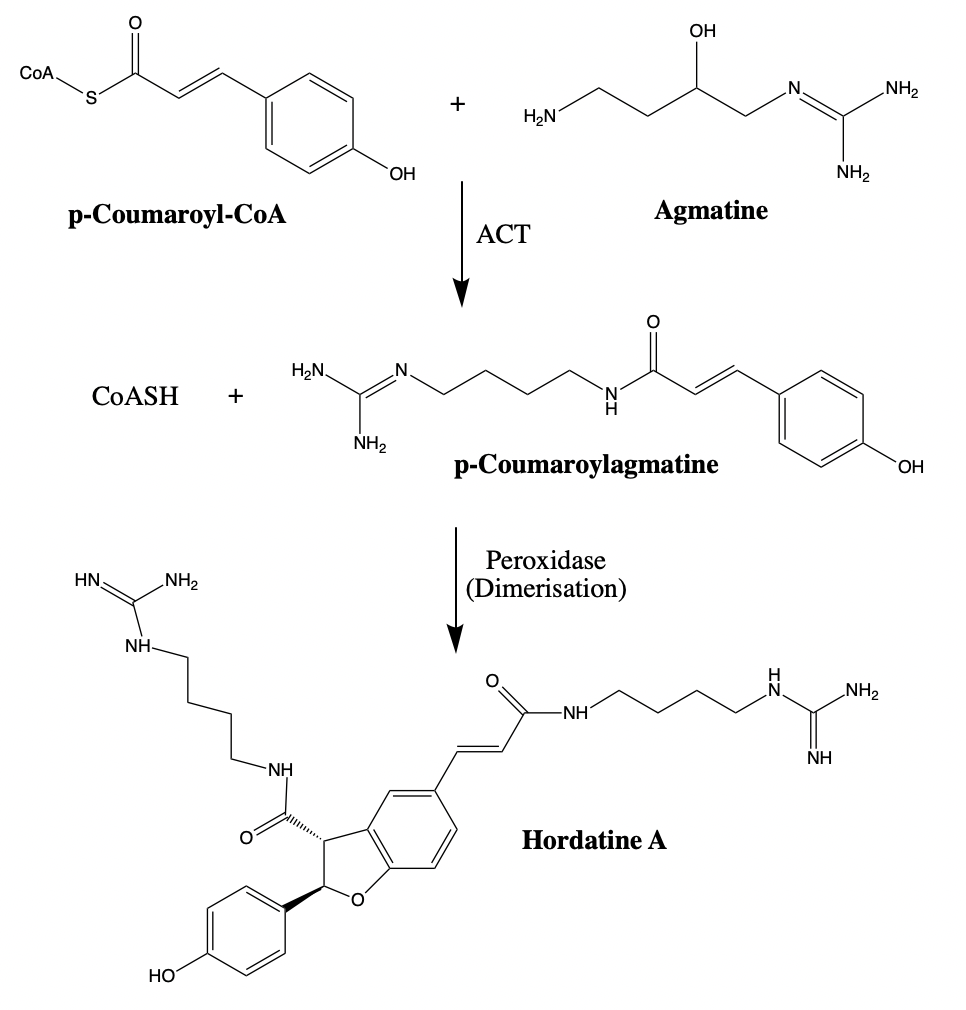
Biosynthesis of hordatine A, where ACT = agmatine coumaroyltransferase, CoASH = coenzyme A.

== Function ==
Hordatine A and hordatine B are potential inhibitors of COVID-19 main protease and RNA polymerase, and could serve as potential therapeutic drugs against COVID-19. Hordatine A has been found to overcome activity of key targets of COVID-19, the first being the protease 7BQY and the second being the RNA polymerase 7bV2. Out of multiple target compounds found to possess binding affinities to these targets, hordatine A and hordatine B were found to not only have the highest binding affinity but to also have a higher binding affinity than the native ligand in RNA polymerase, Remdesivir. This is due to the substantial interaction of Hordatine A and B with varying receptor-binding residues, as well as the hydrogen bond formation of Hordatines to catalytic residues.
