= 2-Ethylphenol =

Names
- Preferred IUPAC name 2-Ethylphenol

Identifiers
CAS Number	90-00-6
3D model (JSmol)	Interactive image
ChEBI	CHEBI:34275
ChEMBL	ChEMBL321029
ChemSpider	13865680
ECHA InfoCard	100.001.781
EC Number	201-958-4
KEGG	C14385
PubChem CID	6997
UNII	355O0P4JU7
UN number	3145
CompTox Dashboard (EPA)	DTXSID1022479
- InChI: InChI=1S/C8H10O/c1-2-7-5-3-4-6-8(7)9/h3-6,9H,2H2,1H3 Key: IXQGCWUGDFDQMF-UHFFFAOYSA-N
- SMILES: CCC1=CC=CC=C1O

Properties
Chemical formula	C_{8}H_{10}O
Molar mass	122.167 g·mol^{−1}
Appearance	colorless liquid
Density	1.0146 g/cm^{3}
Melting point	−3.3 °C (26.1 °F; 269.8 K)

Hazards
- GHS labelling
Pictograms	(GHS05: Corrosive) (GHS07: Exclamation mark)
Signal word	Danger
Hazard statements	H302, H312, H314
Precautionary statements	P260, P264, P270, P271, P280, P301+P312, P301+P330+P331, P302+P352, P303+P361+P353, P304+P312, P304+P340, P305+P351+P338, P310, P312, P321, P322, P330, P332+P313, P362, P363, P403+P233, P405, P501
- Except where otherwise noted, data are given for materials in their standard state (at 25 °C [77 °F], 100 kPa). Infobox references

2-Ethylphenol is an organic compound with the formula C_{2}H_{5}C_{6}H_{4}OH. It is one of three isomeric ethylphenols. A colorless liquid, it occurs as an impurity in xylenols and as such is used in the production of commercial phenolic resins. It is produced by ethylation of phenol using ethylene or ethanol in the presence of aluminium phenolate.
