= Tin hydroxide =

Tin hydroxide may refer to:

- Tin(II) hydroxide Sn(OH)_{2}, also known as stannous hydroxide
- Tin(IV) hydroxide Sn(OH)_{4}, also known as stannic hydroxide
