= Tin(IV) nitrate =

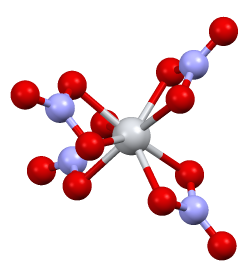

Names
- Other names: Stannic nitrate

Identifiers
CAS Number	13826-70-5
3D model (JSmol)	Interactive image
ChemSpider	8104756
ECHA InfoCard	100.222.600
EC Number	694-339-7
PubChem CID	23278539
CompTox Dashboard (EPA)	DTXSID501336748
- InChI: InChI=1S/4NO3.Sn/c4*2-1(3)4;/q4*-1;+4 Key: YQMWDQQWGKVOSQ-UHFFFAOYSA-N
- SMILES: [N+](=O)([O-])O[Sn](O[N+](=O)[O-])(O[N+](=O)[O-])O[N+](=O)[O-]

Properties
Chemical formula	Sn(NO_{3})_{4}
Molar mass	366.73 g/mol
Appearance	Silky Crystals
Density	2.65 g/cm^{3}
Melting point	91 °C (196 °F; 364 K)
Boiling point	98 °C (208 °F; 371 K) (decomposes)
Solubility in water	Reacts
Solubility	Soluble in carbon tetrachloride, chloroform

Structure
Crystal structure	Monoclinic
Space group	P2_{1}/c
Lattice constant	a = 7.80 Å, b = 13.85 Å, c = 10.23 Å

Hazards
- GHS labelling
Pictograms	(GHS03: Oxidizing) (GHS05: Corrosive)
Signal word	Danger
Hazard statements	H272, H314
Precautionary statements	P220, P280, P305+P351+P338, P310
- Except where otherwise noted, data are given for materials in their standard state (at 25 °C [77 °F], 100 kPa). Infobox references

Tin(IV) nitrate is the inorganic compound with the formula Sn(NO_{3})_{4}. It is a white volatile solid, reflecting its molecular structure.

== Structure ==
Like titanium(IV) nitrate, Sn(NO_{3})_{4} features four bidentate ligands. The eight Sn–O bonds are 2.161 Å in length. The molecule has idealized D4d symmetry.

== Production ==
It was first prepared in the 1960s. Tin(IV) chloride was added to dinitrogen pentoxide at −78 °C, which produced tin(IV) nitrate and nitryl chloride:

SnCl_{4} + 4 N_{2}O_{5} → Sn(NO_{3})_{4} + 4 NO_{2}Cl

== Reactions ==
This compound is sensitive to water, it hydrolyzes into tin(IV) oxide and nitrogen dioxide. Tin(IV) nitrate reacts with trifloroacetic acid anhydride to yield (NO_{2}^{+})_{2}[Sn(OOCCF_{3})_{6}^{2−}] which is a nitronium salt. With trifluoroacetic acid a similar compound solvated with trifluoroacetic acid is produced.

It also reacts with acetic anhydride or acetic acid to produce tin(IV) acetate and with nitric oxide to produce tin(IV) oxynitrate.

The reaction of tin(IV) nitrate with triphenylphosphine and triphenylarsine yields dinitratotin(IV)bis(diphenylphosphonate) and dinitratotin(IV)bis(diphenylarsonate).
