= 4-Anisaldehyde =

Chemical compound

- Structural formula of anisaldehyde

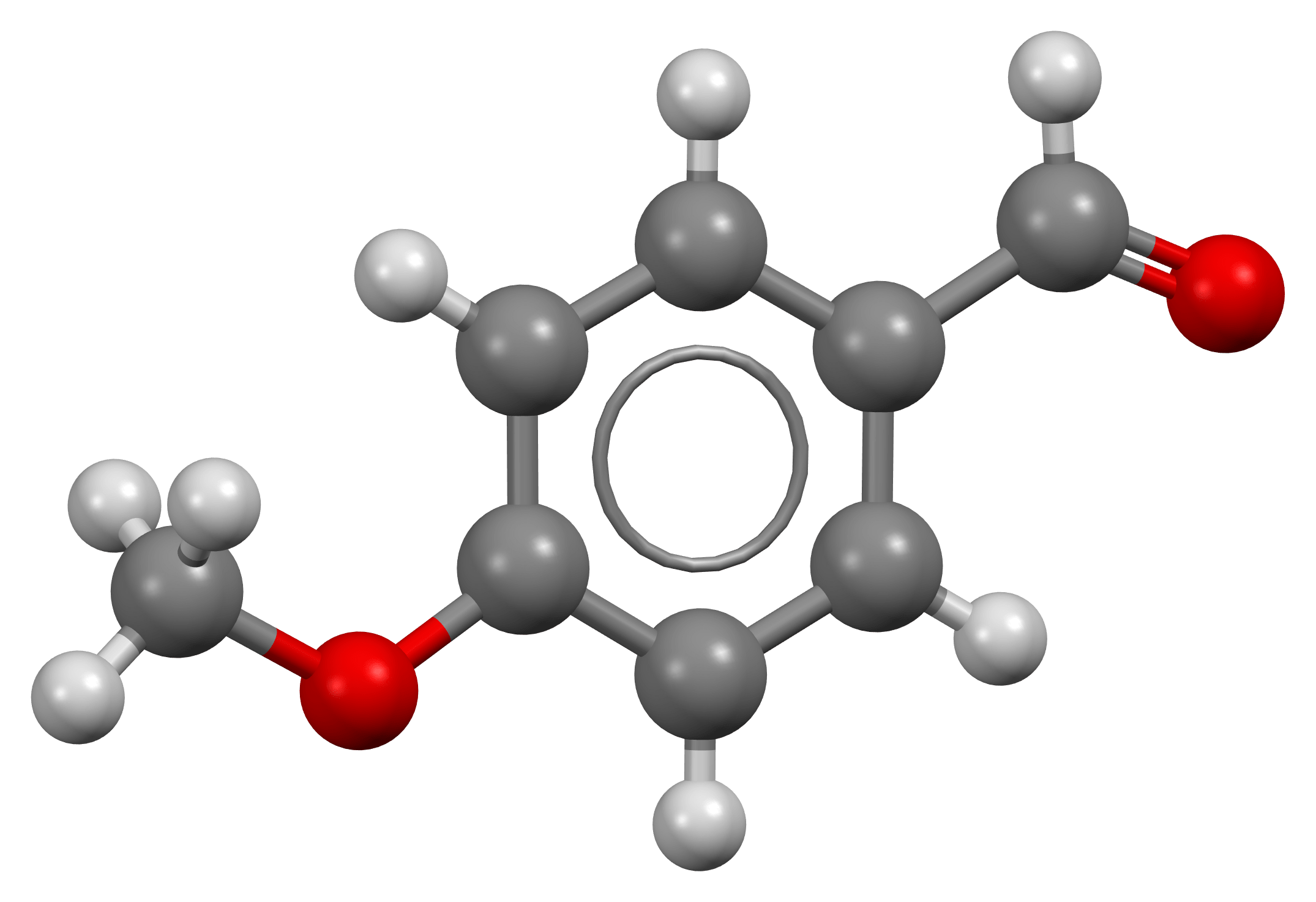
Ball-and-stick model of the anisaldehyde molecule
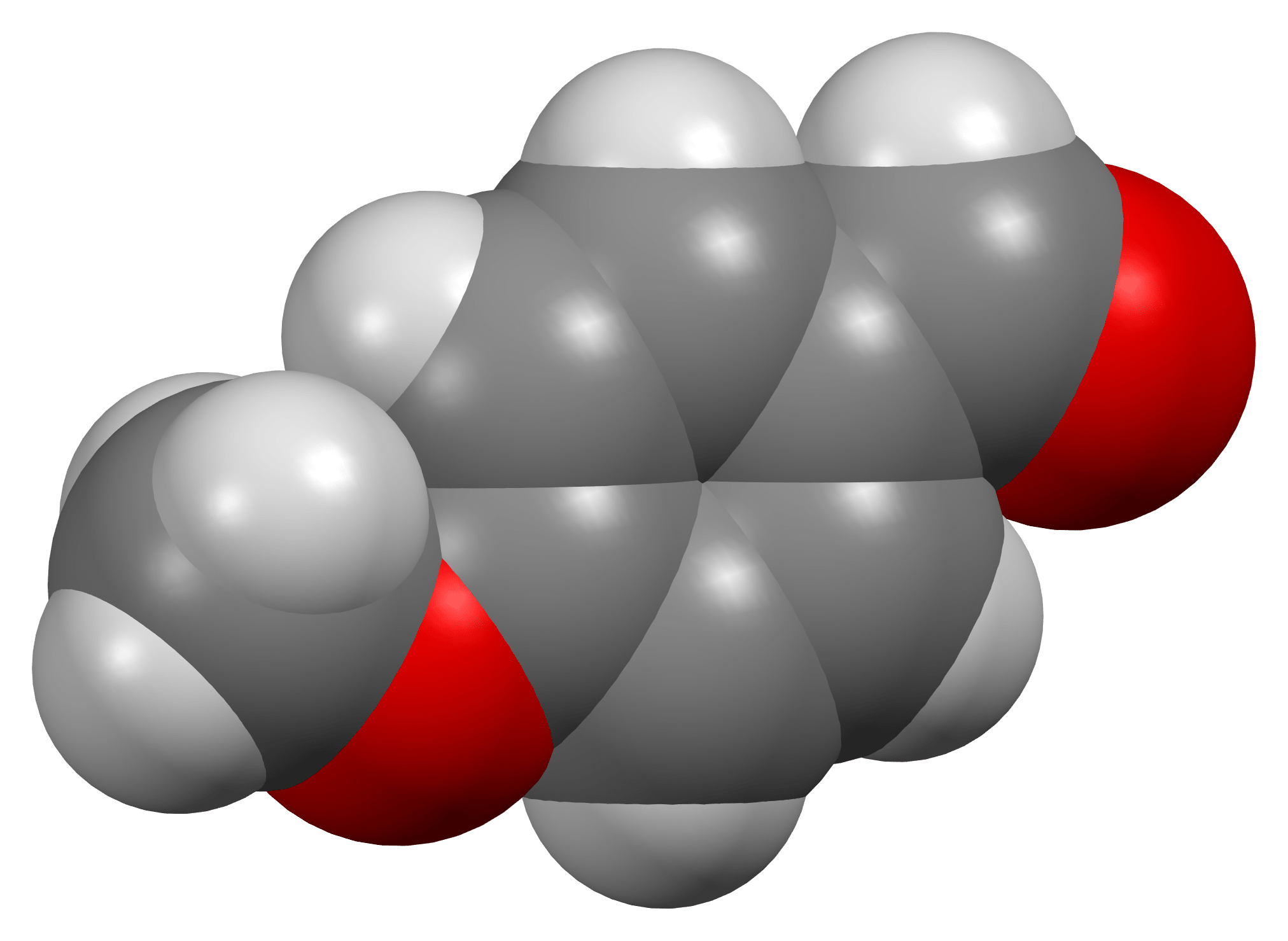
Space-filling model of the anisaldehyde molecule

Names
- Preferred IUPAC name 4-Methoxybenzaldehyde
- Other names: 4-Anisaldehyde; p-Anisaldehyde; para-Anisaldehyde; Anisic aldehyde; Anise aldehyde

Identifiers
CAS Number	123-11-5
3D model (JSmol)	Interactive image
ChEBI	CHEBI:28235
ChEMBL	ChEMBL161598
ChemSpider	28984; 21105937
ECHA InfoCard	100.004.185
EC Number	204-602-6
KEGG	C10761
PubChem CID	31244
UNII	9PA5V6656V
CompTox Dashboard (EPA)	DTXSID2026997
- InChI: InChI=1S/C8H8O2/c1-10-8-4-2-7(6-9)3-5-8/h2-6H,1H3 Key: ZRSNZINYAWTAHE-UHFFFAOYSA-N; InChI=1/C8H8O2/c1-10-8-4-2-7(6-9)3-5-8/h2-6H,1H3 Key: ZRSNZINYAWTAHE-UHFFFAOYAA
- SMILES: COc1ccc(C=O)cc1

Properties
Chemical formula	C_{8}H_{8}O_{2}
Molar mass	136.150 g·mol^{−1}
Density	1.119 g/cm^{3}
Melting point	−1 °C (30 °F; 272 K)
Boiling point	248 °C (478 °F; 521 K)

Hazards
- GHS labelling
Pictograms	(GHS07: Exclamation mark)
Signal word	Warning
Hazard statements	H302
Precautionary statements	P264, P270, P301+P312, P330, P501
Flash point	108 °C (226 °F; 381 K)
- Except where otherwise noted, data are given for materials in their standard state (at 25 °C [77 °F], 100 kPa). verify (what is ?) Infobox references

4-Anisaldehyde, or p-Anisaldehyde, is an organic compound with the formula CH_{3}OC_{6}H_{4}CHO. The molecule consists of a benzene ring with a formyl and a methoxy group. It is a colorless liquid with a strong aroma. It provides sweet, floral and strong aniseed odor. Two isomers of 4-anisaldehyde are known, ortho-anisaldehyde and meta-anisaldehyde. They are less commonly encountered.

== Production ==
Anisaldehyde is prepared commercially by oxidation of 4-methoxytoluene (p-cresyl methyl ether) using manganese dioxide to convert a methyl group to the aldehyde group. It can also be produced by oxidation of anethole, a related fragrance that is found in some alcoholic beverages, by oxidative cleavage of an alkene.

== Uses ==
Being structurally related to vanillin, 4-anisaldehyde is widely used in the fragrance and flavour industry. It is used as an intermediate in the synthesis of other compounds important in pharmaceuticals and perfumery. The related ortho isomer has a scent of liquorice.

In perfumery, it is particularly used in hawthorn, lilac, and cherry blossom accords because of its good tenacity. It also serves as a key intermediate in the synthesis of the antibiotic amoxicillin.

A solution of para-anisaldehyde in acid and ethanol is a useful stain in thin layer chromatography. Different chemical compounds on the plate can give different colors, allowing easy distinction.
