= Barium stannate =

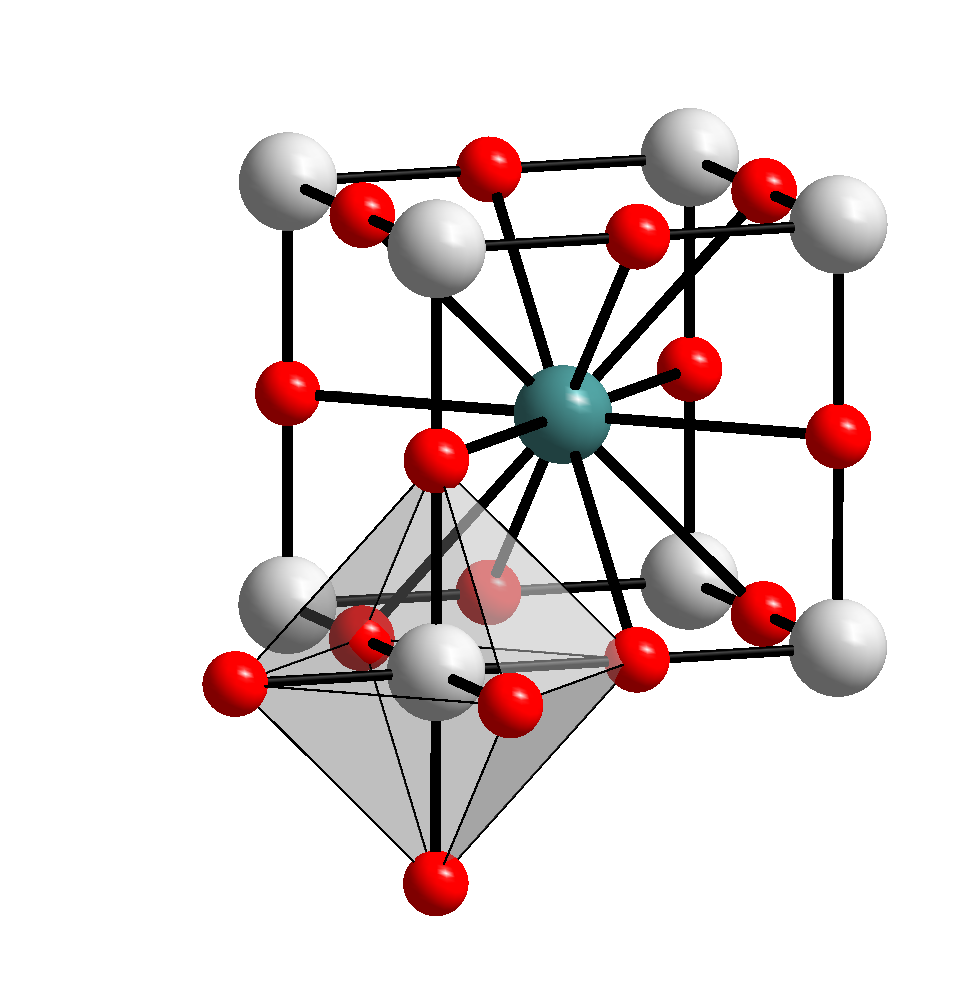
- Perovskite crystal structure

Names
- Other names: Barium tin oxide; Barium tin trioxide; Tin barium oxide

Identifiers
CAS Number	12009-18-6
3D model (JSmol)	Interactive image
ChemSpider	145421
ECHA InfoCard	100.031.392
PubChem CID	13981640
CompTox Dashboard (EPA)	DTXSID001010272
- InChI: InChI=1S/Ba.3O.Sn/q+2;;2*-1; Key: URVCLAAWPGGXHD-UHFFFAOYSA-N
- SMILES: [O-][Sn](=O)[O-].[Ba+2]

Properties
Chemical formula	BaO_{3}Sn
Molar mass	304.034 g·mol^{−1}
Appearance	white solid
Density	7.24 g/cm^{3}
Solubility in water	slightly soluble

Structure
Crystal structure	cubic
Space group	Pm3m (No. 221)
Lattice constant	a = 4.115 Å α = 90°, β = 90°, γ = 90°

Hazards
- GHS labelling
Pictograms	(GHS07: Exclamation mark)
Signal word	Warning
Hazard statements	H302, H332
- Except where otherwise noted, data are given for materials in their standard state (at 25 °C [77 °F], 100 kPa). Infobox references

Barium stannate (BSO) is an oxide of barium and tin with the chemical formula BaSnO_{3}. It is a wide band gap semiconductor with a perovskite crystal structure. A trihydrate exists and is used in the production of ceramic insulation requiring dielectric properties.

== Preparation ==
Polycrystalline barium stannate can be prepared by a solid state reaction between barium carbonate and tin(IV) oxide.
