= 2-Methoxybenzaldehyde =

Names
- Preferred IUPAC name 2-Methoxybenzaldehyde
- Other names: o-anisaldehyde; ortho-anisaldehyde

Identifiers
CAS Number	135-02-4
3D model (JSmol)	Interactive image
ChEMBL	ChEMBL396295
ChemSpider	21111781
ECHA InfoCard	100.004.702
EC Number	205-171-7
PubChem CID	8658
UNII	7CP821WF2W
CompTox Dashboard (EPA)	DTXSID1051690
- InChI: InChI=1S/C8H8O2/c1-10-8-5-3-2-4-7(8)6-9/h2-6H,1H3 Key: PKZJLOCLABXVMC-UHFFFAOYSA-N
- SMILES: COC1=CC=CC=C1C=O

Properties
Chemical formula	C_{8}H_{8}O_{2}
Molar mass	136.150 g·mol^{−1}
Appearance	colorless liquid
Density	1.127 g/cm^{3}
Melting point	34–40 °C (93–104 °F; 307–313 K)
Boiling point	268 °C (514 °F; 541 K)

Hazards
- GHS labelling
Pictograms	(GHS07: Exclamation mark)
Signal word	Warning
Hazard statements	H315, H319, H335
Precautionary statements	P261, P264, P271, P280, P302+P352, P304+P340, P305+P351+P338, P312, P321, P332+P313, P337+P313, P362, P403+P233, P405, P501
- Except where otherwise noted, data are given for materials in their standard state (at 25 °C [77 °F], 100 kPa). Infobox references

2-Methoxybenzaldehyde is an organic compound with the formula CH_{3}OC_{6}H_{4}CHO. It is also commonly referred to as o-anisaldehyde. As a methylated version of salicylaldehyde, the molecule consists of a benzene ring with adjacent formyl and a methoxy groups. It is a colorless solid with a pleasant aroma. The related isomer 4-anisaldehyde is better known, being a commercial flavorant. 2-Anisaldehyde is prepared commercially by formylation of anisole.

It is used to produce 25I-NBOMe.
