= Methoxytoluene =

Methoxytoluenes (methylanisoles or cresyl methyl ethers) are a group of three isomeric organic compounds with the formula CH_{3}OC_{6}H_{4}CH_{3}. They consist of a disubstituted benzene ring with methoxy group and one methyl group. All three are colorless flammable liquids which are soluble in organic solvents but poorly soluble in water. They are not of major commercial interest although they are precursors to the corresponding methoxybenzoic acids and methoxybenzaldehydes.

== Chemical properties ==
Methoxytoluene Isomers
| Common names | 2-Methoxytoluene; 2-Methylanisole; Ortho cresyl methyl ether | 3-Methoxytoluene; 3-Methylanisole; Meta cresyl methyl ether | 4-Methoxytoluene; 4-Methylanisole; Para cresyl methyl ether |
| Structure |
| PubChem number | [33637] | [7530] | [7731] |
| CAS number | [578-58-5] | [100-84-5] | [104-93-8] |
| Melting point | −34.1 °C (−31 °F; 238 K) | −47 °C (−52.6 °F; 226 K) | −23 °C (44.6 °F; 280 K) |
| Boiling point | 171 °C (318.2 °F; 432 K) | 175.5 °C (323.6 °F; 435 K) | 175.5 °C (323.6 °F; 435 K) |
| Density | 0.9798 g/cm^{3} | 0.9716 g/cm^{3} | 0.969 g/cm^{3} |

== See also ==
- Phenetole, a structural isomer
