= 2,6-Xylidine =

Names
- Preferred IUPAC name 2,6-Dimethylaniline
- Other names: 2,6-Dimethylbenzene-1-amine; 2,6-Dimethylbenzenamine; 2,6-Dimethylphenylamine

Identifiers
CAS Number	87-62-7
3D model (JSmol)	Interactive image
ChEBI	CHEBI:28738
ChemSpider	6630
ECHA InfoCard	100.001.599
KEGG	C11004
PubChem CID	6896
UNII	4FT62OX08D
CompTox Dashboard (EPA)	DTXSID8026307
- InChI: InChI=1S/C8H11N/c1-6-4-3-5-7(2)8(6)9/h3-5H,9H2,1-2H3 Key: UFFBMTHBGFGIHF-UHFFFAOYSA-N; InChI=1/C8H11N/c1-6-4-3-5-7(2)8(6)9/h3-5H,9H2,1-2H3 Key: UFFBMTHBGFGIHF-UHFFFAOYAI
- SMILES: Nc1c(cccc1C)C

Properties
Chemical formula	C_{8}H_{11}N
Molar mass	121.183 g·mol^{−1}
Appearance	Colorless liquid
Density	0.9842 g/mL
Melting point	11.45 °C (52.61 °F; 284.60 K)
Boiling point	215 °C (419 °F; 488 K)
Refractive index (n_{D})	1.5601
- Except where otherwise noted, data are given for materials in their standard state (at 25 °C [77 °F], 100 kPa). Infobox references

2,6-Xylidine is an organic compound with the formula C_{6}H_{3}(CH_{3})_{2}NH_{2}. It is one of several isomeric xylidines. It is a colorless viscous liquid. Commercially significant derivatives are the anesthetics lidocaine, bupivacaine, mepivacaine, and etidocaine.

== Production, occurrence, reactions ==
Many xylidines are prepared by nitration of a xylene followed by hydrogenation of the nitroaromatic, but this approach is not efficient for this isomer. Instead, it is prepared from by treatment of the related xylenol with ammonia in the presence of oxide catalysts.

2,6-Xylidine is also a major metabolite of the drug xylazine in both horses, and humans.

2,6-Xylidine is the precursor to the NHC ligand called Xyl.

== Uses ==
2,6-Xylidine is a precursor to the fungicide metalaxyl and the herbicide metazachlor.

Synthesis of metazachlor
