= Stannate =

Ion

In chemistry, the term stannate or tinnate refers to compounds of tin (Sn). Stannic acid (Sn(OH)_{4}), the formal precursor to stannates, does not exist and is actually a hydrate of SnO_{2}. The term is also used in naming conventions as a suffix; for example the hexachlorostannate ion is SnCl_{6}^{2−}.

In materials science, two kinds of tin oxyanions are distinguished:

- orthostannates contain discrete SnO_{4}^{4−} units (e.g. K_{4}SnO_{4}) or have a spinel structure (e.g. Mg_{2}SnO_{4})
- metastannates with a stoichiometry M^{II}SnO_{3}, M^{I}_{2}SnO_{3} which may contain polymeric anions or may be sometimes better described as mixed oxides

These materials are semiconductors.

== Examples ==
- Barium stannate, BaSnO_{3} (a metastannate)
- Cobalt stannate, Co_{2}SnO_{4}, primary constituent of the pigment cerulean blue
- Dysprosium stannate, Dy_{2}Sn_{2}O_{7}
- Lead stannate, Pb_{2}SnO_{4}, "Type I" lead-tin yellow
- Potassium stannate, formally potassium hexahydroxostannate(IV), formula K_{2}Sn(OH)_{6}
- Zinc Stannate, formula ZnSnO_{3}, used as a flame retardant additive for polymers.
- Sodium stannate, formally sodium hexahydroxostannate(IV), formula Na_{2}Sn(OH)_{6}

== See also ==
- Stannite
- Silicate
