= Etidocaine =

Chemical compound

Clinical data
- Trade names: Duranest
- AHFS/Drugs.com: Micromedex Detailed Consumer Information
- MedlinePlus: a603026
- Pregnancy category: AU: B1
- Routes of administration: Parenteral
- ATC code: N01BB07 (WHO)

Legal status
- Legal status: US: ℞-only

Pharmacokinetic data
- Bioavailability: n/a
- Metabolism: Hepatic
- Elimination half-life: 2.5 hours
- Excretion: Renal

Identifiers
- IUPAC name: N-(2,6-dimethylphenyl)- 2-(ethyl(propyl)amino)butanamide
- CAS Number: 36637-18-0
- PubChem CID: 37497
- IUPHAR/BPS: 2621
- DrugBank: DB08987
- ChemSpider: 34400
- UNII: I6CQM0F31V
- KEGG: D04095
- ChEBI: CHEBI:4904
- ChEMBL: ChEMBL492
- CompTox Dashboard (EPA): DTXSID1023027
- ECHA InfoCard: 100.048.296

Chemical and physical data
- Formula: C_{17}H_{28}N_{2}O
- Molar mass: 276.424 g·mol^{−1}
- 3D model (JSmol): Interactive image
- SMILES: O=C(Nc1c(C)cccc1C)C(CC)N(CC)CCC
- InChI: InChI=1S/C17H28N2O/c1-6-12-19(8-3)15(7-2)17(20)18-16-13(4)10-9-11-14(16)5/h9-11,15H,6-8,12H2,1-5H3,(H,18,20); Key:VTUSIVBDOCDNHS-UHFFFAOYSA-N

Etidocaine, marketed under the trade name Duranest, is an amide-type local anesthetic given by injection during surgical procedures and labor and delivery. Etidocaine has a long duration of activity, and the main disadvantage of use during dentistry is increased bleeding during surgery.

== Synthesis ==
Patent: 2-bromobutyryl chloride synthesis:

The amide reaction between 2,6-xylidine (1) and 2-bromobutyryl chloride [22118-12-3] (2) gives 2-Bromo-N-(2,6-Dimethylphenyl)Butanamide [53984-81-9] (3). Alkylation with N-Ethylpropylamine [20193-20-8] (4) gives Etidocaine (5).
