= 2,6-Dibromoquinonechlorimide =

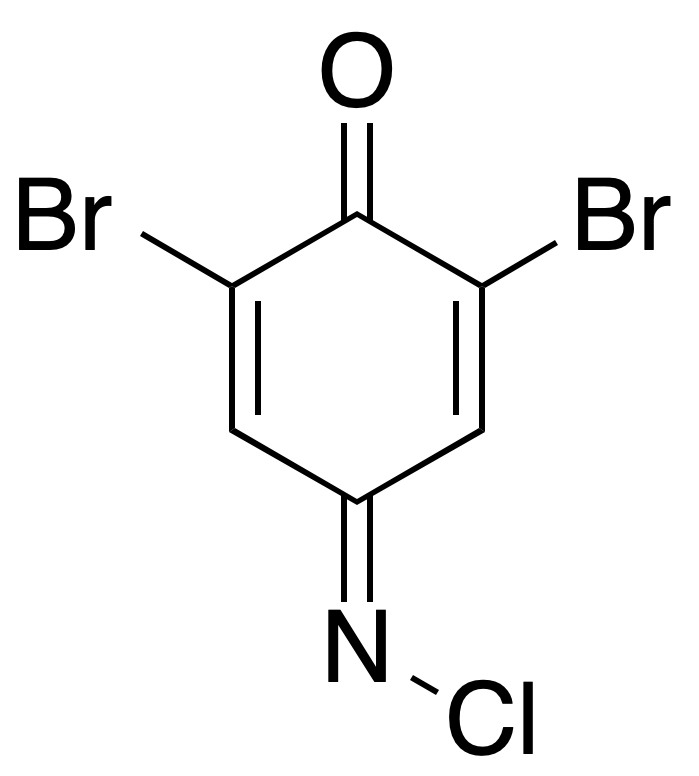

Names
- Preferred IUPAC name 2,6-Dibromo-4-(chloroimino)cyclohexa-2,5-dien-1-one

Identifiers
CAS Number	537-45-1
3D model (JSmol)	Interactive image
ChEMBL	ChEMBL3276933
ChemSpider	10378
ECHA InfoCard	100.007.881
EC Number	208-667-1
PubChem CID	10835
UNII	H750J4PI0N
CompTox Dashboard (EPA)	DTXSID1060215
- InChI: InChI=1S/C6H2Br2ClNO/c7-4-1-3(10-9)2-5(8)6(4)11/h1-2H Key: JYWKEVKEKOTYEX-UHFFFAOYSA-N
- SMILES: C1=C(C(=O)C(=CC1=NCl)Br)Br

Properties
Chemical formula	C_{6}H_{2}Br_{2}ClNO
Molar mass	299.35 g·mol^{−1}
Appearance	yellow powder

Hazards
- GHS labelling
Pictograms	(GHS01: Explosive) (GHS07: Exclamation mark)
Signal word	Danger
Hazard statements	H240, H312, H315, H319, H335
Precautionary statements	P210, P220, P234, P261, P264, P271, P280, P302+P352, P304+P340, P305+P351+P338, P312, P321, P322, P332+P313, P337+P313, P362, P363, P370+P378, P370+P380+P375, P403+P233, P403+P235, P405, P411, P420, P501
- Except where otherwise noted, data are given for materials in their standard state (at 25 °C [77 °F], 100 kPa). Infobox references

2,6-Dibromoquinonechlorimide is used in chemical analysis and chromatography to detect phenolic chemicals. In the presence of phenolic substances it turns indigo in colour. In the presence of aflatoxin it turns green. 2,6-Dibromoquinonechlorimide explodes if heated above 120 °C and decomposes slowly over 60 °C.

2,6-Dibromoquinonechlorimide is used in a buffer solution around pH 9.4. It is very sensitive and can detect down to 0.05 parts per million of phenols. The mechanism is the chlorimide group (=NCl) reaction with the phenol to produce an indophenol, with two rings joined via an =N- link.
