= 3-Ethylphenol =

3-Ethyl phenol
- Chemical structure of 3-ethyl phenol

Names
- Preferred IUPAC name 3-Ethylphenol

Identifiers
CAS Number	620-17-7
3D model (JSmol)	Interactive image
ChEBI	CHEBI:34332
ChemSpider	11604
ECHA InfoCard	100.009.663
KEGG	C14386
PubChem CID	12101
UNII	0G9ZK222JX
CompTox Dashboard (EPA)	DTXSID0022480
- InChI: InChI=1S/C8H10O/c1-2-7-4-3-5-8(9)6-7/h3-6,9H,2H2,1H3 Key: HMNKTRSOROOSPP-UHFFFAOYSA-N
- SMILES: Oc1cc(ccc1)CC

Properties
Chemical formula	C_{8}H_{10}O
Molar mass	122.167 g·mol^{−1}
Appearance	colorless liquid
Density	1.0076 g/cm^{3}
Melting point	−4.5 °C (23.9 °F; 268.6 K)
- Except where otherwise noted, data are given for materials in their standard state (at 25 °C [77 °F], 100 kPa). Infobox references

3-Ethylphenol is an organic compound with the formula C_{2}H_{5}C_{6}H_{4}OH. It is one of three isomeric ethylphenols. A colorless liquid, it occurs as an impurity in xylenols and as such is used in the production of commercial phenolic resins.

== Production ==
3-Ethylphenol is produced by vigorous sulfonation of ethylbenzene, whereby initially produced 4-ethylphenylsulfonic acid converts to 3-ethylphenylsulfonic acid. The sulfonic acid is subsequently subjected to alkaline fusion, the dissolution of the sulfonic acid in molten alkali metal base (at 350 °C). The main steps in the synthesis are shown:

EtC_{6}H_{5} + SO_{3} → EtC_{6}H_{4}SO_{3}H (Et = ethyl)
EtC_{6}H_{4}SO_{3}H + NaOH → EtC_{6}H_{4}ONa + NaHSO_{3}
EtC_{6}H_{4}ONa + H^{+} → ArOH + Na^{+}

== Niche use and occurrence ==
3-Ethylphenol is found in urine samples of female elephants.

It is used as a photographic chemical intermediate and an intermediate for the cyan coupler of photographic paper. It's a tsetse fly attractant. Therefore, it's a kairomone.
