= Tin(II) hydroxide =

Names
- IUPAC name Tin(II) hydroxide
- Other names Stannous hydroxide

Identifiers
CAS Number	12026-24-3
3D model (JSmol)	Interactive image
ChemSpider	19989070
ECHA InfoCard	100.031.542
EC Number	234-710-9
PubChem CID	9793862
CompTox Dashboard (EPA)	DTXSID8042474 DTXSID101014203, DTXSID8042474
- InChI: InChI=1S/2H2O.Sn/h2*1H2;/q;;+2/p-2 Key: FBGKGORFGWHADY-UHFFFAOYSA-L
- SMILES: [OH-].[OH-].[Sn+2]

Properties
Chemical formula	Sn(OH)_{2}
Molar mass	152.73 g/mol

Thermochemistry
Std molar entropy (S^{⦵}_{298})	155 J·mol^{−1}·K^{−1}
Std enthalpy of formation (Δ_{f}H^{⦵}_{298})	−561 kJ·mol^{−1}
- Except where otherwise noted, data are given for materials in their standard state (at 25 °C [77 °F], 100 kPa). Infobox references

Tin(II) hydroxide, Sn(OH)_{2}, also known as stannous hydroxide, is an inorganic compound of tin(II). The only related material for which definitive information is available is the oxy hydroxide Sn_{6}O_{4}(OH)_{4}, but other related materials are claimed. They are all white solids that are insoluble in water.

== Preparation and structure ==
Crystals of Sn_{6}O_{4}(OH)_{4} has been characterized by X-ray diffraction. This cluster is obtained from solution of basic solutions of tin(II). The compound consists of an octahedron of Sn centers, each face of which is capped by an oxide or a hydroxide. The structure is reminiscent of the Mo_{6}S_{8} subunit of the Chevrel phases. The structure of pure Sn(OH)_{2} is not known.

Sn(OH)_{2} has been claimed to arise from the reaction of (CH_{3})_{3}SnOH with SnCl_{2} in an aprotic solvent:

2 Me_{3}SnOH + SnCl_{2} → Sn(OH)_{2} + 2 Me_{3}SnCl

No crystallographic characterization is available on this material.

== Reactions ==
Stannous hydroxide adds additional hydroxide ligands to form stannites. Air easily oxidizes stannous hydroxide to stannic oxide (SnO_{2}).
