= 2,6-Xylenol =

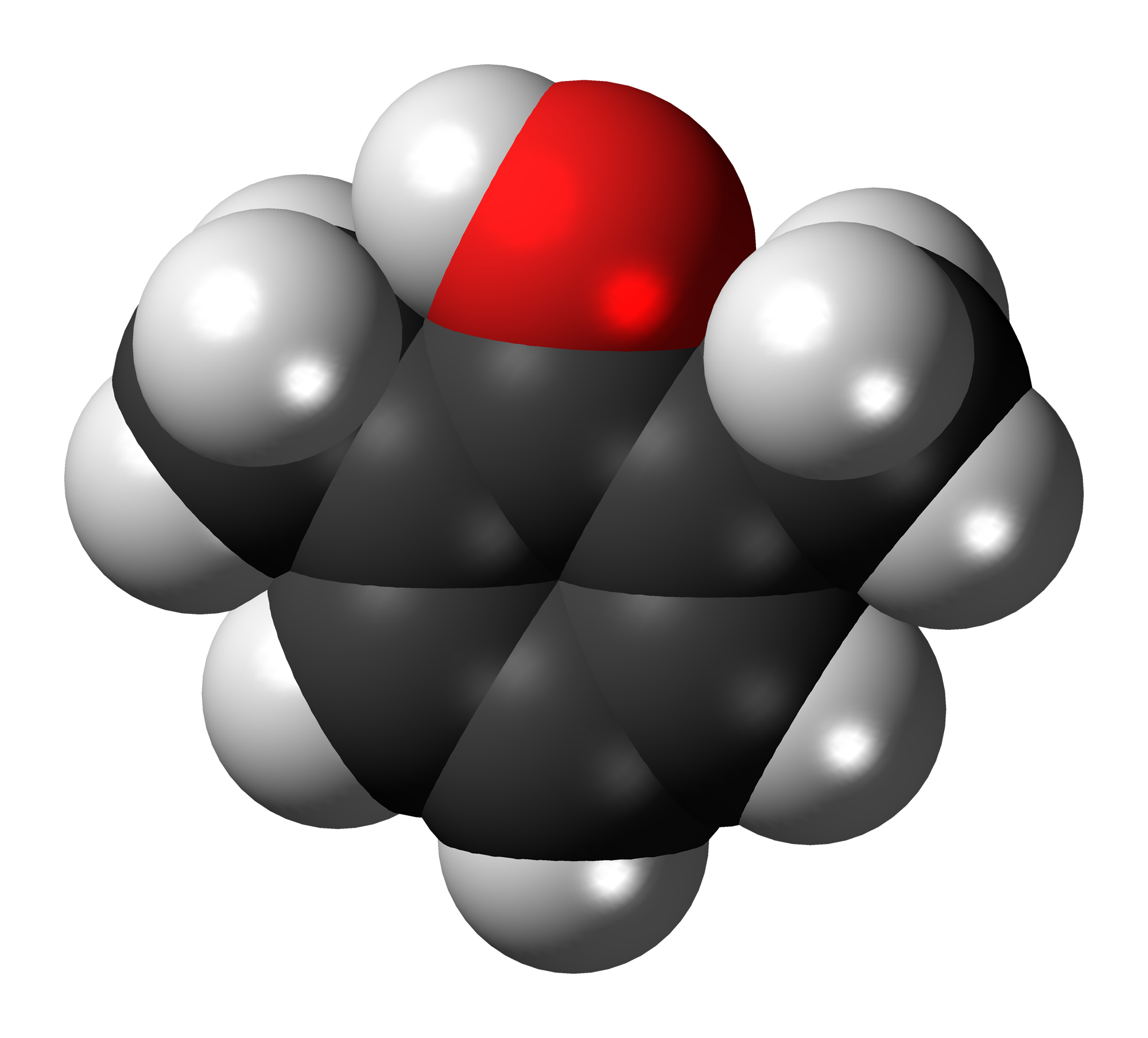

Names
- Preferred IUPAC name 2,6-Dimethylphenol
- Other names 2-Hydroxy-m-xylene

Identifiers
CAS Number	576-26-1
3D model (JSmol)	Interactive image
ChemSpider	13839174
ECHA InfoCard	100.008.547
PubChem CID	11335
UNII	I8N0RO87OV
CompTox Dashboard (EPA)	DTXSID2049711 DTXSID9024063, DTXSID2049711
- InChI: InChI=1S/C8H10O/c1-6-4-3-5-7(2)8(6)9/h3-5,9H,1-2H3 Key: NXXYKOUNUYWIHA-UHFFFAOYSA-N; InChI=1/C8H10O/c1-6-4-3-5-7(2)8(6)9/h3-5,9H,1-2H3 Key: NXXYKOUNUYWIHA-UHFFFAOYAM
- SMILES: CC1=C(C(=CC=C1)C)O

Properties
Chemical formula	C_{8}H_{10}O
Molar mass	122.167 g·mol^{−1}
Appearance	white solid
Density	1.132 g/cm^{3}
Melting point	43 to 45 °C (109 to 113 °F; 316 to 318 K)
Boiling point	203 °C (397 °F; 476 K)

Hazards
Flash point	86 °C (187 °F; 359 K)
- Except where otherwise noted, data are given for materials in their standard state (at 25 °C [77 °F], 100 kPa). verify (what is ?) Infobox references

2,6-Xylenol is a chemical compound which is one of the six isomers of xylenol. It is also commonly known as 2,6-dimethylphenol (DMP). It is a colorless solid.

== Production ==
2,6-DMP is produced by the methylation of phenol. With production >100,000 tons/y, it is the most important xylenol. The methylation is carried out by contacting gaseous phenol and methanol at elevated temperatures in the presence of a solid acid catalyst:

C_{6}H_{5}OH + 2 CH_{3}OH → (CH_{3})_{2}C_{6}H_{3}OH + 2 H_{2}O

Challenges associated with the production is the similarity of the boiling points of cresols and this xylenol.

== Reactions ==
Acid-catalyzed condensation of 2,6-xylenol gives tetramethylbisphenol A. An analogue of bisphenol A, this bisphenol is used in the production of some polycarbonates. 2,6-Xylenol reacts with ammonia to give 2,6-dimethylaniline.

The antiseptic chloroxylenol is produced by chlorination of this xylenol.

2,6-Xylenol is susceptible to oxidative coupling leading to polymers and dimers.

== Toxicity ==
Its LD50 (oral, rats) ranges from 296-1750 mg/kg.
