= Stannite (ion) =

Polyatomic ion

The stannite ion is [Sn(OH)_{3}]^{−}. It can be formed by adding strong base to stannous hydroxide. The stannite ion is a strong reducing agent; also, it may disproportionate to tin metal plus stannate ion.

There are stannite compounds, for example, sodium stannite, Na_{2}SnO_{2}.

== See also ==
- Stannate
