= Sodium stannate =

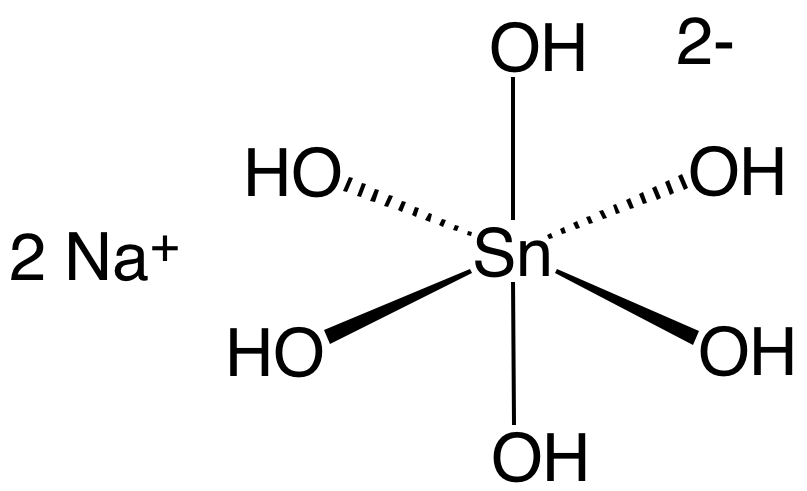

Names
- IUPAC name Sodium hexahydroxostannate(IV)
- Other names disodium hexahydroxyltin Sodium stannate(IV) sodium stannate–3–water sodium tin(IV) oxide hydrate

Identifiers
| CAS Number | 12027-70-2 |
| 3D model (JSmol) | Interactive image |
| ChemSpider | 145444 |
| ECHA InfoCard | 100.031.554 |
| EC Number | 234-724-5 |
| PubChem CID | 131868867 |
| UNII | NJ7C1V83KG |
| CompTox Dashboard (EPA) | DTXSID70891881 |
- InChI: InChI=1S/2Na.6H2O.Sn/h;;6*1H2;/q2*+1;;;;;;;+4/p-6 Key: PMPBLIIMRRPPEO-UHFFFAOYSA-H
- SMILES: [OH-].[OH-].[OH-].[OH-].[OH-].[OH-].[Na+].[Na+].[Sn+4]

Properties
| Chemical formula | H_{6}Na_{2}O_{6}Sn |
| Molar mass | 266.73 g/mol |
| Appearance | Colorless or white solid |
| Density | 4.68 g/cm^{3} |
| Boiling point | N/A |

Hazards
- GHS labelling
| Pictograms | (GHS05: Corrosive) (GHS07: Exclamation mark) |
| Signal word | Danger |
| Hazard statements | H314, H315, H319, H335, H412 |
| Precautionary statements | P260, P264, P271, P273, P280, P301+P330+P331, P302+P352, P303+P361+P353, P304+P340, P305+P351+P338, P310, P312, P321, P332+P313, P337+P313, P362, P363, P403+P233, P405, P501 |
| NFPA 704 (fire diamond) | 2 0 0 |
| Flash point | 57 °C (135 °F; 330 K) |
| Autoignition temperature | N/A |
- Lethal dose or concentration (LD, LC)
| LD_{50} (median dose) | 2132 mg/kg [Mouse] |
- Safety data sheet (SDS)

Related compounds
| Other anions | Sodium carbonate; Sodium silicate; Sodium germanate |
- Except where otherwise noted, data are given for materials in their standard state (at 25 °C [77 °F], 100 kPa). Infobox references

Sodium stannate, formally sodium hexahydroxostannate(IV), is the inorganic compound with the formula Na_{2}[Sn(OH)_{6}]. This colourless salt forms upon dissolving metallic tin or tin(IV) oxide in sodium hydroxide and is used as a stabiliser for hydrogen peroxide.

In older literature, stannates are sometimes represented as having the simple oxyanion SnO_{3}^{2−}, in which case this compound is sometimes named as sodium stannate–3–water and represented as Na_{2}SnO_{3}·3H_{2}O, a hydrate with three waters of crystallisation. The anhydrous form of sodium stannate, Na_{2}SnO_{3}, is recognised as a distinct compound with its own CAS Registry Number, 12058-66-1 , and a distinct material safety data sheet.

The anion is a coordination complex that is octahedral in shape, similar to most stannates, such as the hexachlorostannate anion [SnCl_{6}]^{2−}. The Sn—O bond distances average 2.071 Å.

== Preparation ==
Alkali metal stannate compounds are prepared by dissolving elemental tin in a suitable metal hydroxide, in the case of sodium stannate by the reaction:

Sn + 2 NaOH + 4 H_{2}O → Na_{2}[Sn(OH)_{6}] + 2 H_{2}

A similar reaction occurs when tin dioxide is dissolved in base:

SnO_{2} + 2 NaOH + 2 H_{2}O → Na_{2}[Sn(OH)_{6}]

The anhydrous form can also be prepared from tin dioxide by roasting with sodium carbonate in a mixed carbon monoxide / carbon dioxide environment:

SnO_{2} + Na_{2}CO_{3} → Na_{2}SnO_{3} + CO_{2}
