= Aluminium phenolate =

Names
- Other names Aluminium phenoxide

Identifiers
CAS Number	15086-27-8
3D model (JSmol)	Interactive image
ChemSpider	146313
ECHA InfoCard	100.035.565
EC Number	239-137-8
PubChem CID	167236
CompTox Dashboard (EPA)	DTXSID401015343
- InChI: InChI=1S/3C6H6O.Al/c3*7-6-4-2-1-3-5-6;/h3*1-5,7H;/q;;;+3/p-3 Key: OPSWAWSNPREEFQ-UHFFFAOYSA-K
- SMILES: C1=CC=C(C=C1)[O-].C1=CC=C(C=C1)[O-].C1=CC=C(C=C1)[O-].[Al+3]

Properties
Chemical formula	C_{18}H_{15}AlO_{3}
Molar mass	306.297 g·mol^{−1}
Appearance	white solid

Hazards
- GHS labelling
Pictograms	(GHS05: Corrosive)
Signal word	Danger
Hazard statements	H314
Precautionary statements	P260, P264, P280, P301+P330+P331, P303+P361+P353, P304+P340, P305+P351+P338, P310, P321, P363, P405, P501
- Except where otherwise noted, data are given for materials in their standard state (at 25 °C [77 °F], 100 kPa). Infobox references

Aluminium phenolate is the metalloorganic compound with the formula [Al(OC_{6}H_{5})_{3}]_{n}. It is a white solid. ^{27}Al NMR studies suggest that aluminium phenolate exists in benzene solution as a mixture of dimer and trimer. The compound can be prepared by the reaction of elemental aluminium with phenol:

Al + 3 HOC_{6}H_{5} → Al(OC_{6}H_{5})_{3} + 1.5 H_{2}

The compound is used as a catalyst for the alkylation of phenols with various alkenes. For example, the ethylphenols are generated commercially by treating phenol with ethylene in the presence of a catalytic amount of aluminium phenolate.

== Related compounds ==
- Aluminium isopropoxide
