= Tin(II) acetate =

Names
- Other names Tin diacetate

Identifiers
CAS Number	638-39-1
3D model (JSmol)	Interactive image; disolvate: Interactive image
ChemSpider	62694
ECHA InfoCard	100.010.306
EC Number	211-335-9
PubChem CID	69488
UNII	1SKU167W8P
CompTox Dashboard (EPA)	DTXSID30213242
- InChI: InChI=1S/2C2H4O2.Sn/c2*1-2(3)4;/h2*1H3,(H,3,4);/q;;+2/p-2 Key: PNOXNTGLSKTMQO-UHFFFAOYSA-L; disolvate: InChI=1S/4C2H4O2.Sn/c4*1-2(3)4;/h4*1H3,(H,3,4);/q;;;;+2/p-2 Key: ANPGXPGHNRPKFA-UHFFFAOYSA-L
- SMILES: CC(=O)[O-].CC(=O)[O-].[Sn+2]; disolvate: CC(=O)O.CC(=O)O.CC(=O)[O-].CC(=O)[O-].[Sn+2]

Properties
Chemical formula	Sn(CH_{3}COO)_{2}
Molar mass	236.80
Appearance	white crystals
Density	2.310 g·cm^{−3}
Melting point	182.75 °C (360.95 °F; 455.90 K)
- Except where otherwise noted, data are given for materials in their standard state (at 25 °C [77 °F], 100 kPa). Infobox references

Tin(II) acetate is the acetate salt of tin(II), with the chemical formula of Sn(CH_{3}COO)_{2}. It was first discovered in 1822.

== Preparation ==
To obtain tin(II) acetate, tin(II) oxide is dissolved in glacial acetic acid and refluxed to obtain yellow Sn(CH_{3}COO)_{2}·2CH_{3}COOH when cooled. The acetic acid can be removed by heating under reduced pressure, and the white Sn(CH_{3}COO)_{2} crystals can be obtained by sublimation.

== Properties ==
Sn(CH_{3}COO)_{2}·2CH_{3}COOH undergoes disproportionation and decomposition when heated under normal pressure, and products such as tin(IV) oxide and hydrogen are generated. The decomposition of anhydrous Sn(CH_{3}COO)_{2} is to the blue-black tin(II) oxide.

Anhydrous Sn(CH_{3}COO)_{2} decomposes in water, but complexes such as KSn(CH_{3}COO_{2})_{3} and Ba[Sn(CH_{3}COO)_{3}]_{2} can be formed in alkali metal or alkaline earth metal acetates.
