= Frémy's salt =

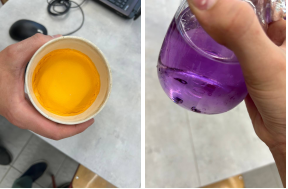
- Fremy's salt (left) and its aqueous solution (right)

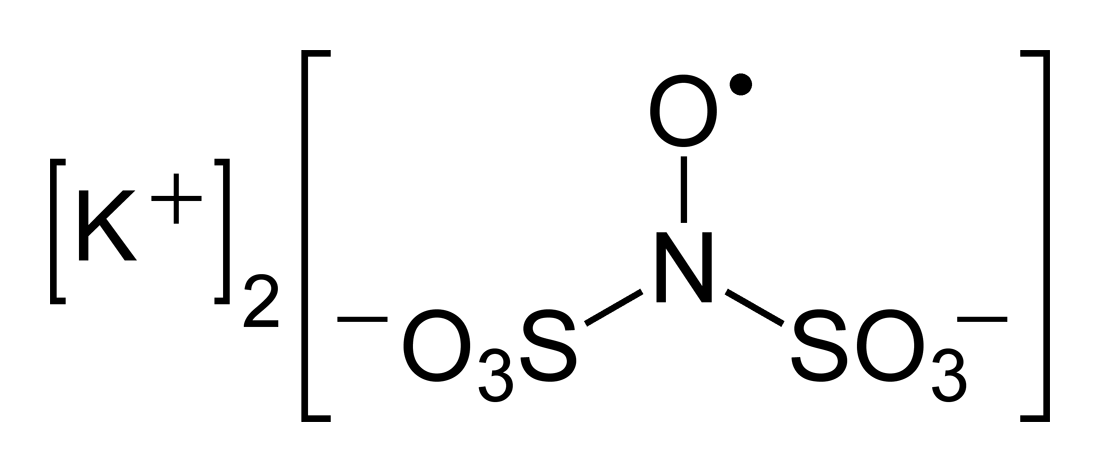

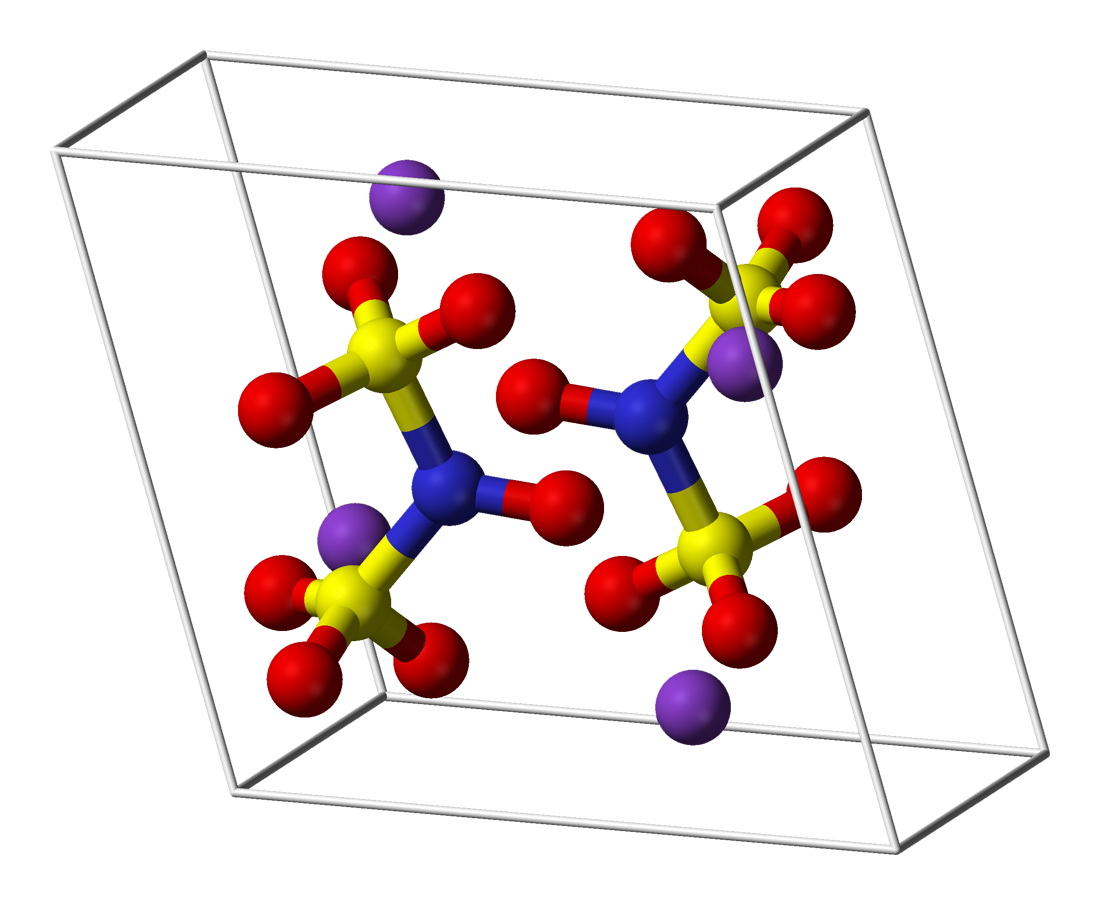

Names
- IUPAC name Potassium nitrosodisulfonate

Identifiers
CAS Number	14293-70-0
3D model (JSmol)	Interactive image
ChemSpider	2297553
ECHA InfoCard	100.034.729
EC Number	238-219-0
PubChem CID	3032624
UNII	1989UAX6B9
- InChI: InChI=1S/2K.H2NO7S2/c;;2-1(9(3,4)5)10(6,7)8/h;;(H,3,4,5)(H,6,7,8)/q2*+1;/p-2 Key: IHSLHAZEJBXKMN-UHFFFAOYSA-L
- SMILES: N([O])(S(=O)(=O)[O-])S(=O)(=O)[O-].[K+].[K+]

Properties
Chemical formula	K_{2}NO(SO_{3})_{2}
Molar mass	268.33 g/mol (potassium salt)
Appearance	Yellowish-brown solid

Hazards
- GHS labelling
Pictograms	(GHS02: Flammable) (GHS07: Exclamation mark)
Signal word	Danger
Hazard statements	H260, H302, H312, H332
Precautionary statements	P223, P231+P232, P280, P301+P312, P302+P352+P312, P304+P340+P312
- Except where otherwise noted, data are given for materials in their standard state (at 25 °C [77 °F], 100 kPa). Infobox references

Frémy's salt is a chemical compound with the formula (K_{4}[ON(SO_{3})_{2}]_{2}), sometimes written as (K_{2}[NO(SO_{3})_{2}]). It is a bright yellowish-brown solid, but its aqueous solutions are bright violet. The related sodium salt, disodium nitrosodisulfonate (NDS, Na_{2}ON(SO_{3})_{2}, CAS 29554-37-8) is also referred to as Frémy's salt.

Regardless of the cations, the salts are distinctive because aqueous solutions contain the radical [ON(SO_{3})_{2}]^{2−}.

== Applications ==
Frémy's salt, being a long-lived free radical, is used as a standard in electron paramagnetic resonance (EPR) spectroscopy, e.g. for quantitation of radicals. Its intense EPR spectrum is dominated by three lines of equal intensity with a spacing of about 13 G (1.3 mT).

The inorganic aminoxyl group is a persistent radical, akin to TEMPO.

It has been used in some oxidation reactions, such as for oxidation of some anilines and phenols allowing polymerization and cross-linking of peptides and peptide-based hydrogels.

It can also be used as a model for peroxyl radicals in studies that examine the antioxidant mechanism of action in a wide range of natural products.

== Preparation ==
Frémy's salt is prepared from hydroxylaminedisulfonic acid. Oxidation of the conjugate base gives the purple dianion:

HON(SO_{3}H)_{2} → [HON(SO_{3})_{2}]^{2−} + 2 H^{+}
2 [HON(SO_{3})_{2}]^{2−} + PbO_{2} → 2 [ON(SO_{3})_{2}]^{2−} + PbO + H_{2}O

The synthesis can be performed by combining nitrite and bisulfite to give the hydroxylaminedisulfonate. Oxidation is typically conducted at low-temperature, either chemically or by electrolysis.

Other reactions:

HNO_{2} + 2 HSO^{−}_{3} → HON(SO_{3})^{2−}_{2} + H_{2}O
3 HON(SO_{3})^{2−}_{2} + MnO^{−}_{4} + H^{+} → 3 ON(SO_{3})^{2−}_{2} + MnO_{2} + 2 H_{2}O
2 ON(SO_{3})^{2−}_{2} + 4 K^{+} → K_{4}[ON(SO_{3})_{2}]_{2}

== History ==
Frémy's salt was discovered in 1845 by Edmond Frémy (1814–1894). Its use in organic synthesis was popularized by Hans Teuber, such that an oxidation using this salt is called the Teuber reaction.
