= 3,4-Xylenol =

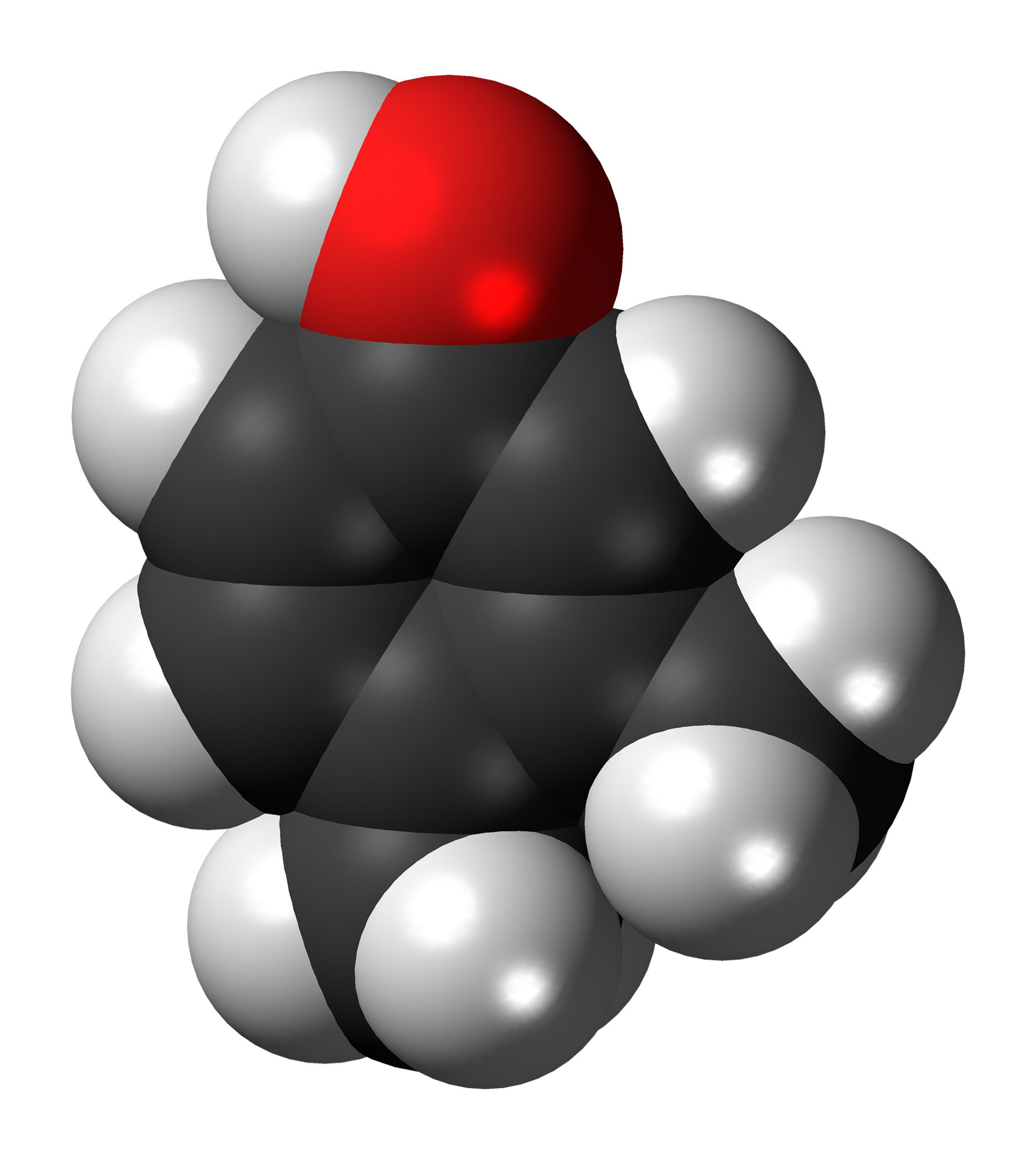

Names
- Preferred IUPAC name 3,4-Dimethylphenol
- Other names 4-Hydroxy-o-xylene

Identifiers
CAS Number	95-65-8
3D model (JSmol)	Interactive image
Beilstein Reference	1099267
ChEBI	CHEBI:39839
ChEMBL	ChEMBL192008
ChemSpider	13839105
DrugBank	DB04052
ECHA InfoCard	100.002.218
EC Number	202-439-5
KEGG	D0777
PubChem CID	7249
UNII	4L479F5JU6
UN number	2261
CompTox Dashboard (EPA)	DTXSID4024062
- InChI: InChI=1S/C8H10O/c1-6-3-4-8(9)5-7(6)2/h3-5,9H,1-2H3 Key: YCOXTKKNXUZSKD-UHFFFAOYSA-N; InChI=1/C8H10O/c1-6-3-4-8(9)5-7(6)2/h3-5,9H,1-2H3 Key: YCOXTKKNXUZSKD-UHFFFAOYAV
- SMILES: CC1=C(C=C(C=C1)O)C

Properties
Chemical formula	C_{8}H_{10}O
Molar mass	122.167 g·mol^{−1}
Boiling point	227 °C (441 °F; 500 K)

Hazards
- GHS labelling
Pictograms	(GHS05: Corrosive) (GHS06: Toxic) (GHS07: Exclamation mark) (GHS09: Environmental hazard)
Signal word	Danger
Hazard statements	H301, H311, H314, H317, H411
Precautionary statements	P260, P264, P270, P272, P273, P280, P301+P310, P301+P330+P331, P302+P352, P303+P361+P353, P304+P340, P305+P351+P338, P310, P312, P321, P322, P330, P333+P313, P361, P363, P391, P405, P501
Flash point	110 °C (230 °F; 383 K)
- Except where otherwise noted, data are given for materials in their standard state (at 25 °C [77 °F], 100 kPa). verify (what is ?) Infobox references

3,4-Xylenol is a chemical compound which is one of the six isomers of xylenol.
