= Ethylphenol =

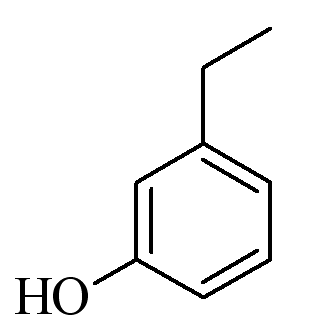
The chemical structure of 3-ethylphenol.

Ethylphenol may refer to:

- 2-Ethylphenol
- 3-Ethylphenol
- 4-Ethylphenol
- Ethyl phenyl ether (O-ethylphenol)
