= Xylenol =

Organic compound

Xylenols are organic compounds with the formula (CH_{3})_{2}C_{6}H_{3}OH. They are volatile colorless solids or oily liquids. They are derivatives of phenol with two methyl groups at various positions relative to the hydroxyl group. Six isomers exist, of which 2,6-xylenol with both methyl groups in an ortho position with respect to the hydroxyl group is the most important. The name xylenol is a portmanteau of the words xylene and phenol.

2,4-Dimethylphenol together with other xylenols and many other compounds are traditionally extracted from coal tar, the volatile materials obtained in the production of coke from coal. These residue contains a few percent by weight of xylenols as well as cresols and phenol. The main xylenols in such tar are the 3,5-, 2,4, and 2,3- isomers. 2,6-Xylenol is produced by methylation of phenol using methanol in the presence of metal oxide catalysts:

C_{6}H_{5}OH + 2 CH_{3}OH → (CH_{3})_{2}C_{6}H_{3}OH + 2 H_{2}O

Typically, xylenols are contaminated with ethylphenols, which have very similar physical properties.

== Properties ==
The physical properties of the six isomeric xylenols are similar.

Isomer	2,6-Xylenol	2,5-Xylenol	2,4-Xylenol	2,3-Xylenol	3,4-Xylenol	3,5-Xylenol
Structure
CAS	576-26-1	95-87-4	105-67-9	526-75-0	95-65-8	108-68-9
Mp °C	43-45	63 - 65	22-23	70-73	62 - 68	61-64
Bp °C	203	212	211-212	217	227	222
pKa	10.59	10.22	10.45	10.50	10.32	10.15
Density g/mL		0.971	1.011

== Uses ==
Together with cresols and cresylic acid, xylenols are a commercially important class of phenolics. They are used in the manufacture of antioxidants. Xylenol orange is a redox indicator built on a xylenol skeleton. 2,6-Xylenol is a monomer for poly(p-phenylene oxide) (PEO) engineering resins through carbon-oxygen oxidative coupling. The common antiseptic chloroxylenol is produced from 2,6-xylenol.

== See also ==
- Dettol
