= Ethyl phenyl ether =

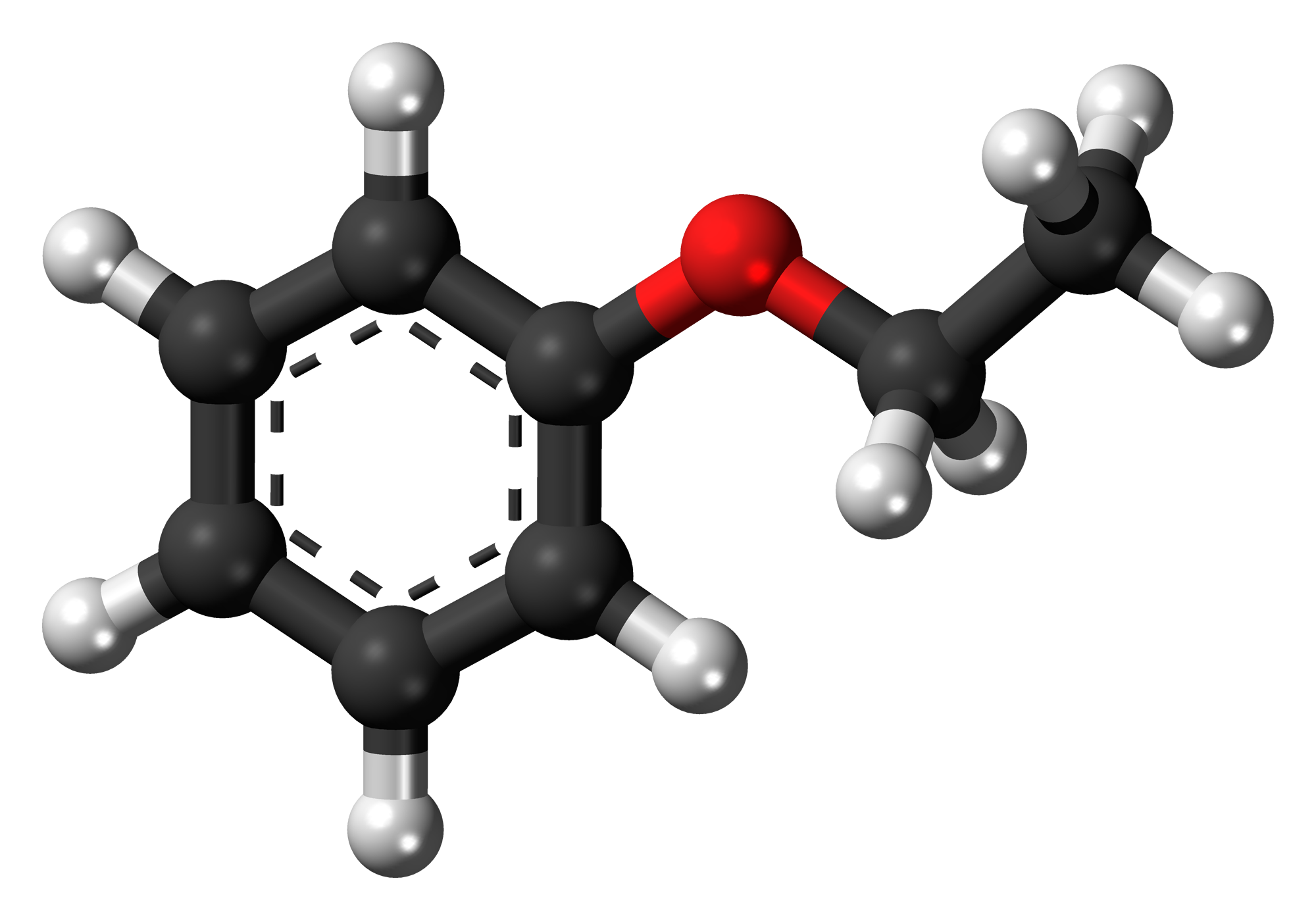

Names
- Preferred IUPAC name Ethoxybenzene
- Other names: Phenetole; Phenoxyethane

Identifiers
CAS Number	103-73-1
3D model (JSmol)	Interactive image
Abbreviations	PhOEt; EtOPh
ChEMBL	ChEMBL499585
ChemSpider	7391
ECHA InfoCard	100.002.854
PubChem CID	7674
UNII	RB8LU2C57F
CompTox Dashboard (EPA)	DTXSID7059278
- InChI: InChI=1S/C8H10O/c1-2-9-8-6-4-3-5-7-8/h3-7H,2H2,1H3 Key: DLRJIFUOBPOJNS-UHFFFAOYSA-N; InChI=1/C8H10O/c1-2-9-8-6-4-3-5-7-8/h3-7H,2H2,1H3 Key: DLRJIFUOBPOJNS-UHFFFAOYAS
- SMILES: O(c1ccccc1)CC

Properties
Chemical formula	C_{8}H_{10}O
Molar mass	122.167 g·mol^{−1}
Appearance	Colorless to yellowish oily liquid
Density	0.967 g/mL
Melting point	−30 °C (−22 °F; 243 K)
Boiling point	169 to 170 °C (336 to 338 °F; 442 to 443 K)
Solubility in water	0.57 g/L

Hazards
Flash point	57 °C (135 °F; 330 K)
- Except where otherwise noted, data are given for materials in their standard state (at 25 °C [77 °F], 100 kPa). verify (what is ?) Infobox references

Ethyl phenyl ether (or phenetole) is an organic compound that belongs to a class of compounds called ethers. Ethyl phenyl ether has the same properties as some other ethers, such as volatility, explosive vapors, and the ability to form peroxides. It will dissolve in less polar solvents such as ethanol or diethyl ether, but not in polar solvents such as water.

== Preparation ==
Ethyl phenyl ether can be prepared by the reaction of phenol with diethyl sulfate:

PhOH + NaOH → PhO^{−}Na^{+} + H_{2}O
PhO^{−}Na^{+} + Et_{2}SO_{4} → Ph-O-Et + EtSO^{−}_{4}Na^{+}

This reaction follows S_{N}2 path.

== See also ==
- Anisole

== Additional references ==
- Organic Chemistry, Fessenden & Fessenden, 6th Edition, Ralph J. Fessenden et al.
- For Antoine constants: http://webbook.nist.gov/cgi/cbook.cgi?ID=C103731&Units=SI&Mask=4#ref-10
