= Oxidative coupling =

Oxidative coupling in chemistry is a coupling reaction of two molecular entities through an oxidative process. Usually oxidative couplings are catalysed by a transition metal complex like in classical cross-coupling reactions, although the underlying mechanism is different due to the oxidation process that requires an external (or internal) oxidant. Many such couplings utilize dioxygen as the stoichiometric oxidant but proceed by electron transfer.

== C-C Couplings ==
Many oxidative couplings generate new C-C bonds. Early examples involve coupling of terminal alkynes:

2 RC≡CH + 2 Cu(I) → RC≡C-C≡CR + 2 Cu + 2 H^{+}

=== Aromatic coupling ===
Idealized lignin structure; aryl-aryl linkages arise from enzymatic oxidative couplings.

In oxidative aromatic coupling the reactants are electron-rich aromatic compounds. Typical substrates are phenols and typical catalysts are copper and iron compounds and enzymes, although Scholl demonstrated that high heat and a Lewis acid suffice. The first reported synthetic application dates back to 1868 with Julius Löwe and the synthesis of ellagic acid by heating gallic acid with arsenic acid or silver oxide. Another reaction is the synthesis of 1,1'-Bi-2-naphthol from 2-naphthol by iron chloride, discovered in 1873 by Alexander Dianin (S)-BINOL can be prepared directly from an asymmetric oxidative coupling of 2-naphthol with copper(II) chloride.

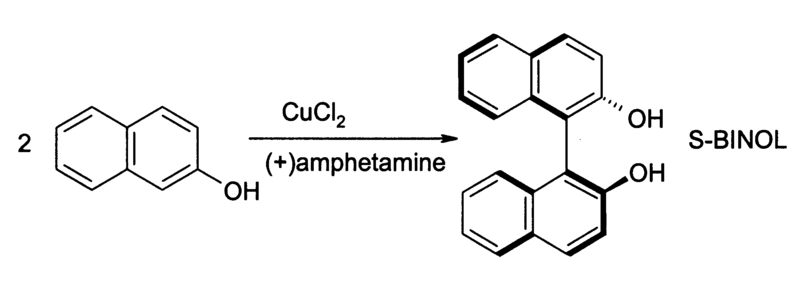

=== Coupling of methane ===
Coupling reactions involving methane are highly sought, related to C1 chemistry because C_{2} derivatives are far more valuable than methane. The oxidative coupling of methane gives ethylene:

2CH_{4} + O_{2} → C_{2}H_{4} + 2H_{2}O

== Other oxidative couplings ==
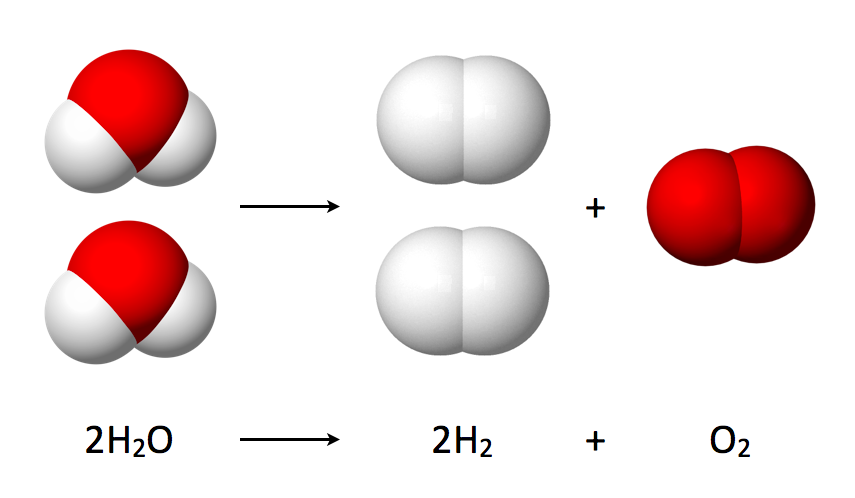
"Coupling" in water electrolysis.

The oxygen evolution reaction entails, in effect, the oxidative coupling of water molecules to give O_{2}.
