= Tin(IV) oxide =

Chemical compound known as stannic oxide, cassiterite and tin ore

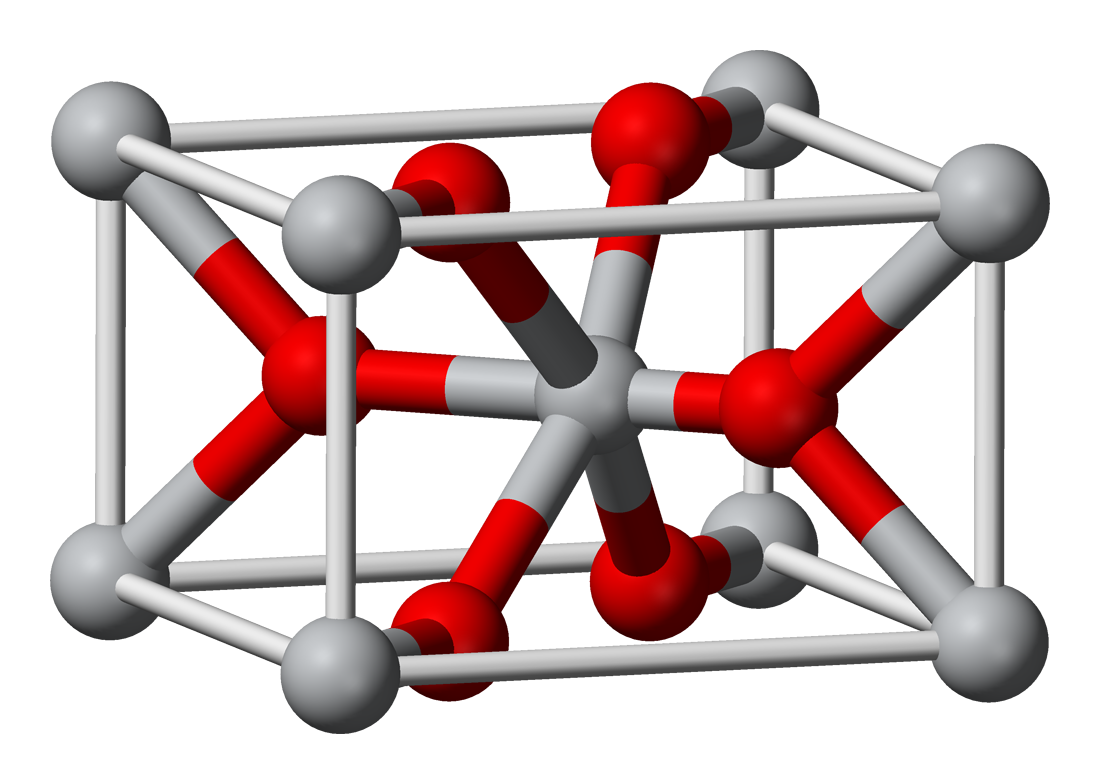
- 3D model of tin (IV) oxide, red atom is oxide

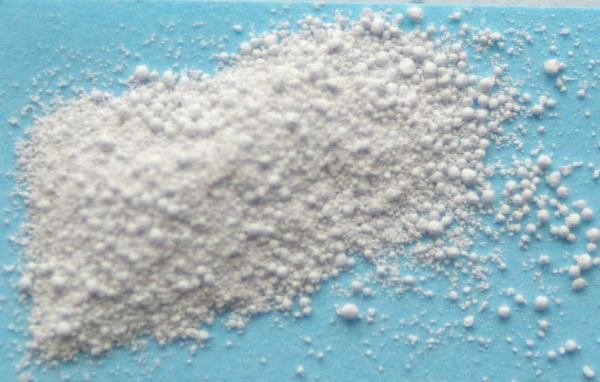
- Sample of tin (IV) oxide

Names
- IUPAC name Tin (IV) Oxide
- Other names: Stannic oxide; Tin(IV) oxide; Flowers of tin; Cassiterite

Identifiers
CAS Number	18282-10-5; 13472-47-4 (hydrate)
3D model (JSmol)	(O=Sn=O): Interactive image
ChemSpider	26988
ECHA InfoCard	100.038.311
EC Number	242-159-0
PubChem CID	29011
RTECS number	XQ4000000
UNII	KM7N50LOS6
CompTox Dashboard (EPA)	DTXSID201316016 DTXSID8042474, DTXSID201316016
- InChI: InChI=1S/2O.Sn Key: XOLBLPGZBRYERU-UHFFFAOYSA-N
- SMILES: (O=Sn=O): O=[Sn]=O

Properties
Chemical formula	SnO_{2}
Molar mass	150.708 g·mol^{−1}
Appearance	Gray tetragonal crystals
Density	6.85 g/cm^{3}
Melting point	1,630 °C (2,970 °F; 1,900 K)
Solubility in water	Insoluble
Solubility	Soluble in hot concentrated alkalis.
Magnetic susceptibility (χ)	−41×10^{−6} cm^{3}/mol
Refractive index (n_{D})	2.006

Structure
Crystal structure	Rutile tetragonal, tP6
Space group	P4_{2}/mnm, No. 136
Point group	4/m 2/m 2/m
Lattice constant	a = 4.737 Å, c = 3.185 Å α = 90°, β = 90°, γ = 90°
Coordination geometry	Octahedral (Sn^{+}_{4}); Trigonal planar (O^{−}_{2})

Thermochemistry
Heat capacity (C)	52.6 J⋅mol^{−1}·K^{-1}
Std molar entropy (S^{⦵}_{298})	49.0 J⋅mol^{−1}·K^{-1}
Std enthalpy of formation (Δ_{f}H^{⦵}_{298})	−577.6 kJ⋅mol^{−1}
Gibbs free energy (Δ_{f}G^{⦵})	−515.8 kJ⋅mol^{−1}
Enthalpy of fusion (Δ_{f}H^{⦵}_{fus})	23.4 kJ⋅mol^{−1}

Hazards
- GHS labelling
Pictograms	None
Hazard statements	None
Precautionary statements	None
NFPA 704 (fire diamond)	1 0 0
Threshold limit value (TLV)	2 mg/m^{3} (TWA)
- Lethal dose or concentration (LD, LC)
LD_{50} (median dose)	>20 g/kg (rat, oral)
LC_{50} (median concentration)	2.04 mg/L (rat, inhaled, 4h)
- NIOSH (US health exposure limits)
PEL (Permissible)	2 mg/m^{3} (TWA)
REL (Recommended)	2 mg/m^{3} (TWA)
IDLH (Immediate danger)	100 mg/m^{3}

Related compounds
Related tin oxides	Tin(II) oxide
- Except where otherwise noted, data are given for materials in their standard state (at 25 °C [77 °F], 100 kPa). verify (what is ?) Infobox references

Tin(IV) oxide, also known as stannic oxide, is the inorganic compound with the formula SnO_{2}. The mineral form of SnO_{2} is called cassiterite, and this is the main ore of tin. With many other names, this oxide of tin is an important material in tin chemistry. It is a colourless, diamagnetic, amphoteric solid.

== Structure ==
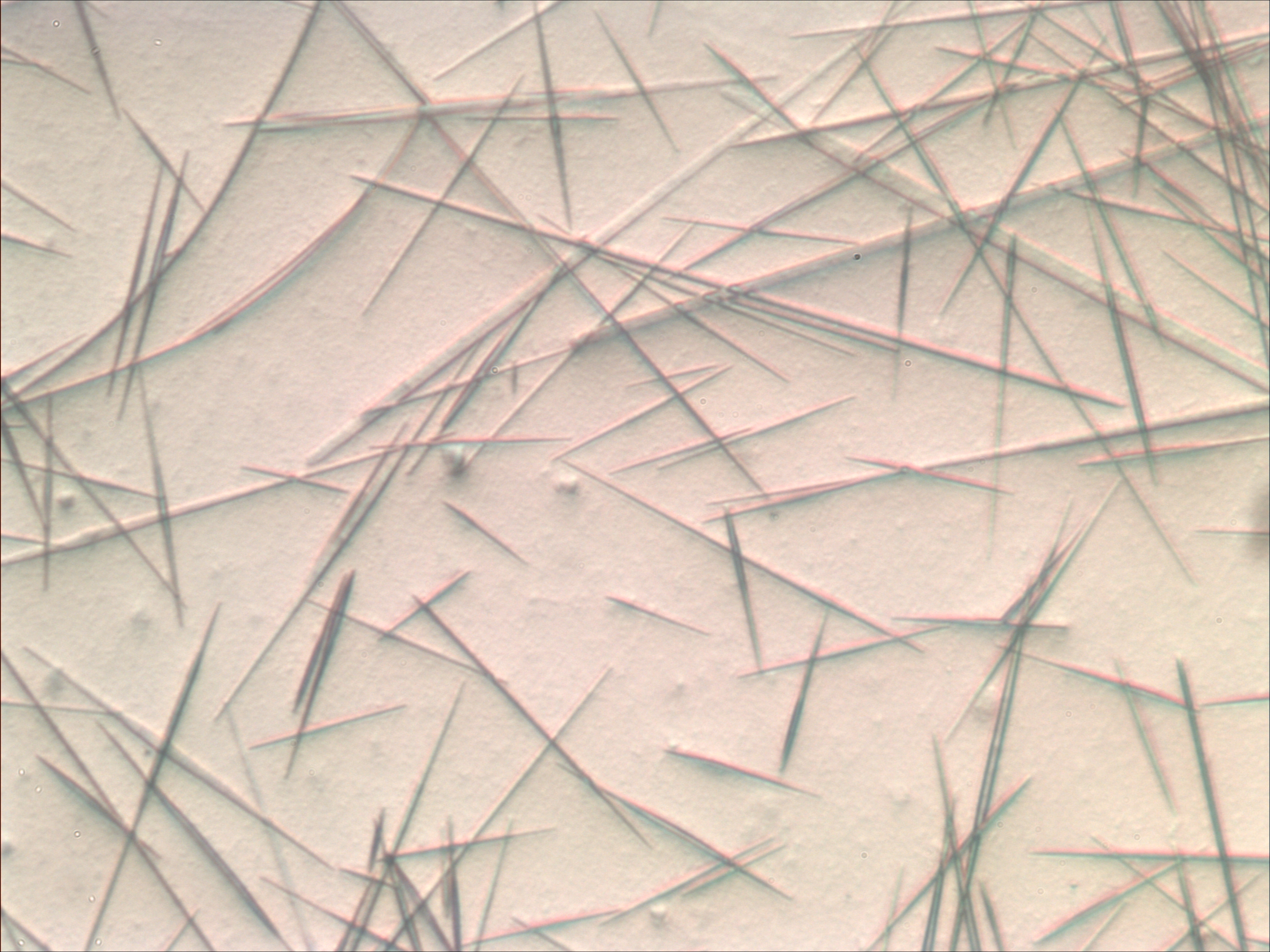
Tin (IV) oxide fibers (optical microscope)

Tin(IV) oxide crystallises with the rutile structure. As such the tin atoms are six coordinate and the oxygen atoms three coordinate. SnO_{2} is usually regarded as an oxygen-deficient n-type semiconductor.

Hydrous forms of SnO_{2} have been described as stannic acid. Such materials appear to be hydrated particles of SnO_{2} where the composition reflects the particle size.

== Preparation ==
Tin(IV) oxide occurs naturally. Synthetic tin(IV) oxide is produced by burning tin metal in air. Annual production is in the range of 10 thousand metric tons (11 thousand short tons). SnO_{2} is reduced industrially to the metal with carbon in a reverberatory furnace at 1,200–1,300 °C (2,190–2,370 °F).

== Reactions ==
The reaction from tin(IV) oxide with hot carbon monoxide is practiced on a large scale as this carbothermal reduction is used to obtain tin metal from its ores:

SnO_{2} + 2 CO → Sn + 2 CO_{2}

Some other reactions relevant to purifying tin from its ores are:

SnO_{2} + MgCl_{2} + CO → SnCl_{2} + MgO + CO_{2}
4 SnO_{2} + 6 FeCl_{2} → 2 SnCl_{2} + 2 SnCl_{4} + 2 Fe_{3}O_{4}

SnO_{2} converts to the monoxide at 1,500 °C (2,730 °F):

2 SnO_{2} → 2 SnO + O_{2}

SnO_{2} is insoluble in water. It dissolves in sulfuric acid and in molten sodium hydroxide. It is not amphoteric. Like rutile, it is not attacked by solutions of acid or base.

Dissolution of SnO_{2} in sulfuric acid gives the sulfate:

SnO_{2} + 2 H_{2}SO_{4} → Sn(SO_{4})_{2} + 2 H_{2}O

The latter compound can add additional hydrogen sulfate ligands to give hexahydrogensulfatostannic acid.

SnO_{2} dissolves in molten alkali to give "stannates," with the nominal formula Sodium stannate (Na_{2}SnO_{3}). Dissolving the solidified SnO_{2}/NaOH melt in water gives Na_{2}[Sn(OH)_{6}], "preparing salt," which is used in the dye industry.

== Uses ==
In conjunction with vanadium oxide, it is used as a catalyst for the oxidation of aromatic compounds in the synthesis of carboxylic acids and acid anhydrides.

=== Ceramic glazes ===
SnO_{2} is used as pigment in the manufacture of glasses, enamels and ceramic glazes. Thousands of tons of SnO_{2} are produced annually for this application. Pure SnO_{2} gives a milky white colour; other colours are achieved when mixed with other metallic oxides e.g. vanadium(V) oxide (V_{2}O_{5}) yellow; Chromium(III) oxide (Cr_{2}O_{3}) pink; and antimony pentoxide (Sb_{2}O_{5}) grey blue. This use probably led to the discovery of the pigment lead-tin-yellow, which was produced using tin(IV) oxide as a compound. The use of tin(IV) oxide has been particularly common in glazes for earthenware, sanitaryware and wall tiles; see the articles tin-glazing and Tin-glazed pottery. Tin oxide remains in suspension in vitreous matrix of the fired glazes, and, with its high refractive index being sufficiently different from the matrix, light is scattered, and hence increases the opacity of the glaze. The degree of dissolution increases with the firing temperature, and hence the extent of opacity diminishes. Although dependent on the other constituents the solubility of tin oxide in glaze melts is generally low. Its solubility is increased by Na_{2}O, K_{2}O and B_{2}O_{3}, and reduced by CaO, BaO, ZnO, Al_{2}O_{3}, and to a limited extent PbO.

=== Glass coatings ===
SnO_{2} coatings are valued as transparent conducting oxides (TCOs). Like other TCOs, SnO_{2} has significant electrical conductivity but is transparent, an unusual combination of properties. Windows coated with SnO_{2} also reflect infrared radiation, which is relevant to temperature control for smart windows. Coatings can be applied using chemical vapor deposition, vapour deposition techniques that employ tin(IV) chloride (SnCl_{4}) or organotin trihalides e.g. butyltin trichloride as the volatile agent. This technique is used to coat glass bottles with a thin (<0.1 μm) layer of SnO_{2}, which helps to adhere a subsequent, protective polymer coating such as polyethylene to the glass.

Thicker layers doped with Sb or F ions are electrically conducting and used in electroluminescent devices and photovoltaics.

=== Gas sensing ===
SnO_{2} has been evaluated as sensors of combustible gases including carbon monoxide detectors. In these the sensor area is heated to a constant temperature (few hundred °C) and in the presence of a combustible gas the electrical resistivity drops.

=== Historical uses ===
This oxide of tin has been utilized as a mordant in the dyeing process since ancient Egypt. A German by the name of Kuster first introduced its use to London in 1533 and by means of it alone, the color scarlet was produced there.

Tin(IV) oxide for this use is sometimes called "putty powder" or "jeweler's putty".

=== Polishing ===
Tin(IV) oxide can be used as a polishing powder, sometimes in mixtures also with lead oxide, for polishing glass, jewelry, marble and silver.
