= Thallium hydroxide =

Thallium hydroxide may refer to:

- Thallium(I) hydroxide
- Thallium(III) hydroxide
