= Aluminium hydroxide oxide =

Names
- IUPAC name Aluminium hydroxide oxide
- Systematic IUPAC name Hydroxidooxidoaluminium (additive)
- Other names Metaaluminic acid

Identifiers
CAS Number	24623-77-6
3D model (JSmol)	Interactive image
ChEBI	CHEBI:30188
ChemSpider	30148
ECHA InfoCard	100.042.138
EC Number	246-368-8
Gmelin Reference	463741
PubChem CID	32524
UNII	NZO8Q0FP2E
CompTox Dashboard (EPA)	DTXSID0052679 DTXSID4051661, DTXSID0052679
- InChI: InChI=1S/Al.H2O.O/h;1H2;/q+1;;/p-1 Key: FAHBNUUHRFUEAI-UHFFFAOYSA-M
- SMILES: O[Al]=O

Properties
Chemical formula	AlHO_{2}
Molar mass	59.988 g·mol^{−1}
Appearance	White powder
Odor	Odorless
Density	3.01 g/cm^{3}
- Except where otherwise noted, data are given for materials in their standard state (at 25 °C [77 °F], 100 kPa). verify (what is ?) Infobox references

Aluminium hydroxide oxide or aluminium oxyhydroxide, AlO(OH) is found as one of two well defined crystalline phases, which are also known as the minerals boehmite and diaspore. The minerals are important constituents of the aluminium ore, bauxite.

== List of related compounds and minerals ==
The aluminium oxides, oxide hydroxides, and hydroxides can be summarized as follows:

- aluminium oxides
  - corundum (Al_{2}O_{3})
- aluminium oxide hydroxides
  - diaspore (α-AlO(OH))
  - boehmite or böhmite (γ-AlO(OH))
  - akdalaite (5Al_{2}O_{3}·H_{2}O) (once believed to be 4Al_{2}O_{3}·H_{2}O), also called tohdite
- aluminium hydroxides
  - gibbsite (often designated as γ-Al(OH)_{3}, but sometimes as α-Al(OH)_{3}, sometimes called hydrargillite or hydrargyllite)
  - bayerite (designated often as α-Al(OH)_{3} but sometimes as β-Al(OH)_{3})
  - doyleite
  - nordstrandite
