= Indium acetate =

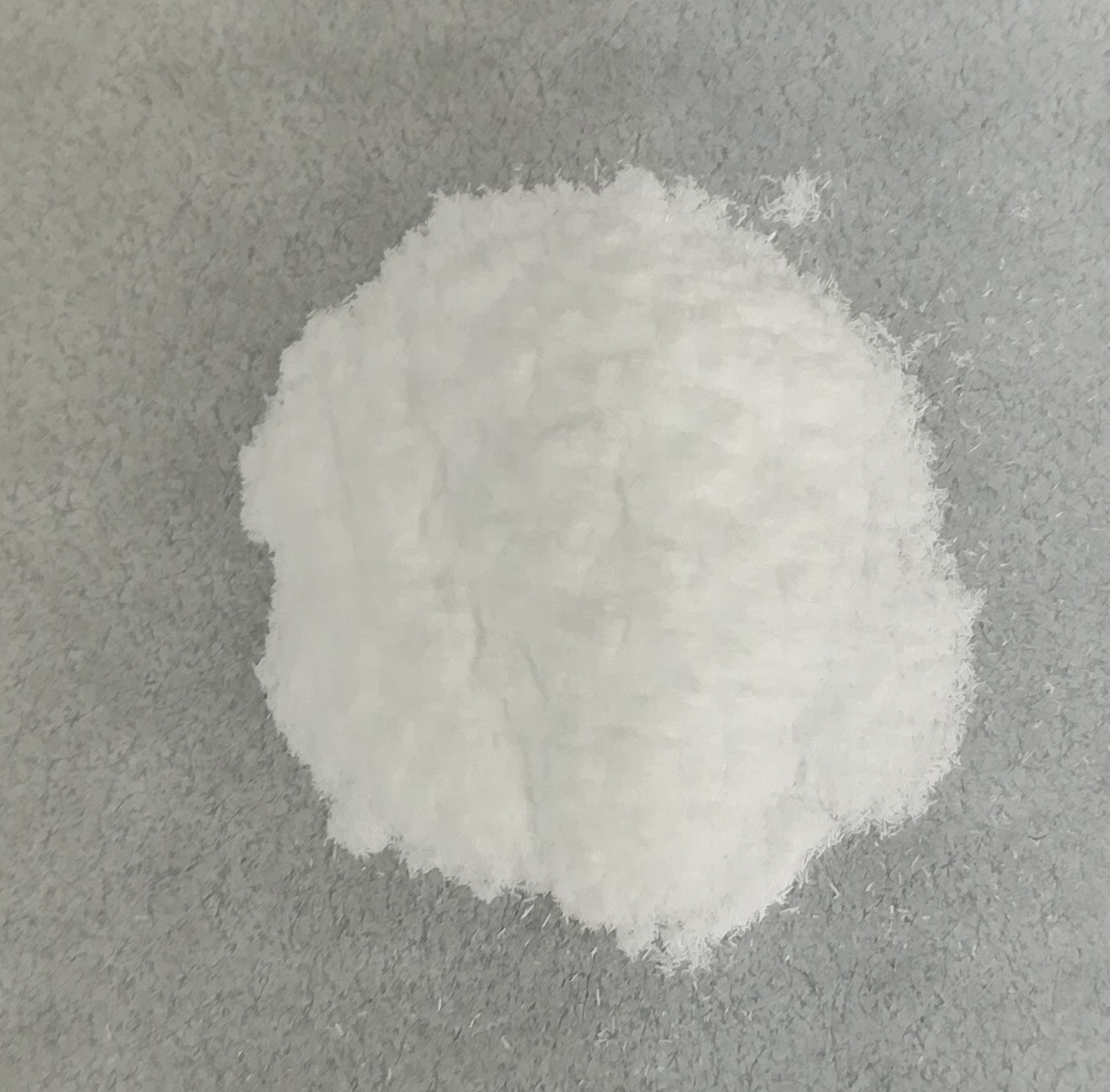

Names
- Other names Indium ethanoate Indium(III) acetate

Identifiers
CAS Number	25114-58-3
3D model (JSmol)	Interactive image
ChemSpider	147211
ECHA InfoCard	100.157.776
EC Number	629-609-5
PubChem CID	16685169
UNII	BNM20F6I0P
CompTox Dashboard (EPA)	DTXSID30890799
- InChI: InChI=1S/3C2H4O2.In/c3*1-2(3)4;/h3*1H3,(H,3,4);/q;;;+3/p-3 Key: VBXWCGWXDOBUQZ-UHFFFAOYSA-K
- SMILES: CC(=O)O[In](OC(=O)C)OC(=O)C

Properties
Chemical formula	In(CH_{3}COO)_{3}
Molar mass	291.96
Appearance	white hygroscopic powder

Related compounds
Other anions	indium nitrate
Other cations	gallium acetate
- Except where otherwise noted, data are given for materials in their standard state (at 25 °C [77 °F], 100 kPa). Infobox references

Indium acetate is an acetate of indium, with the chemical formula In(CH_{3}COO)_{3}. It is soluble in water, acetic acid and mineral acids. It is the precursor of indium-containing compounds such as the solar cell materials CuInS_{2} and indium phosphide quantum dots.

== Preparation ==
Indium acetate can be prepared by reacting indium or triethylindium with frozen acetic acid.

== Chemical properties ==
Indium acetate can react with propionic acid:

In(CH_{3}COO)_{3} + CH_{3}CH_{2}COOH → In(CH_{3}COO)_{2}(CH_{3}CH_{2}COO) + CH_{3}COOH
