= Pseudoboehmite =

Pseudoboehmite is an aluminium compound with the chemical composition AlO(OH). It consists of finely crystalline boehmite. However, the water content is higher than in boehmite.

== History ==
Calvet et al. coined the name pseudoboehmite in 1952 when they synthesized pure aluminium hydroxyde gel. Its XRD pattern is similar to that of boehmite but the relative intensities of the peaks differ.

== Morphology ==
Pseudoboehmite is essentially finely crystalline boehmite which consists of the same or similar octahedral layers in the xz plane but lacks three-dimensional order because of a restricted number of unit cells in y direction. It consists of a significant number of crystallites which contain a single unit cell along y or single octahedral layers. It contains more water which is commonly intercalated between octahedral layers, normally randomly arranged, but sometimes regularly.

The water content consists of adsorbed and chemically bound water. The higher water content compared to boehmite can be explained by a smaller crystallite size. While boehmite consists of relatively long AlOOH chains that have terminal H_{2}O groups, the chains in pseudoboehmite are significantly shorter. This translates into a significantly higher specific water content due to the terminal water groups:

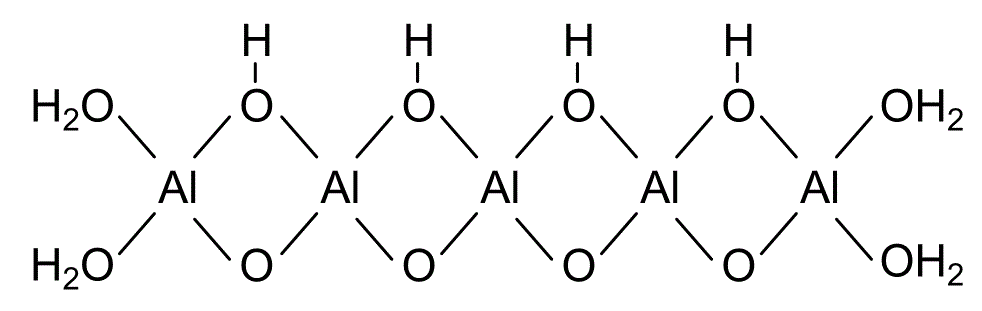

It is a "poorly crystallized" Al^{3+} compound with the composition Al_{2}O_{3} · x H_{2}O (1.0 < x < 2.0) with interplanar spacings increased in the [020]-direction to 0.67 nm in comparison with 0.617 nm for boehmite.

At higher temperatures pseudoboehmite is transformed to γ-alumina but the pore size distribution remains unchanged up to 1000 °C. At around 1100 °C however, specific area significantly decreases because of sintering related to a transformation to α-Al_{2}O_{3}.

== Synthesis ==
Pseudoboehmite can be synthesized by aging non-crystalline aluminium hydroxide gels at pH values between 5.0 and 7.4.

== Uses ==
Pseudoboehmite is used as binder for FCC catalysts and adsorbents. It is also a raw material for activated alumina.
