= Aluminium hydroxide =

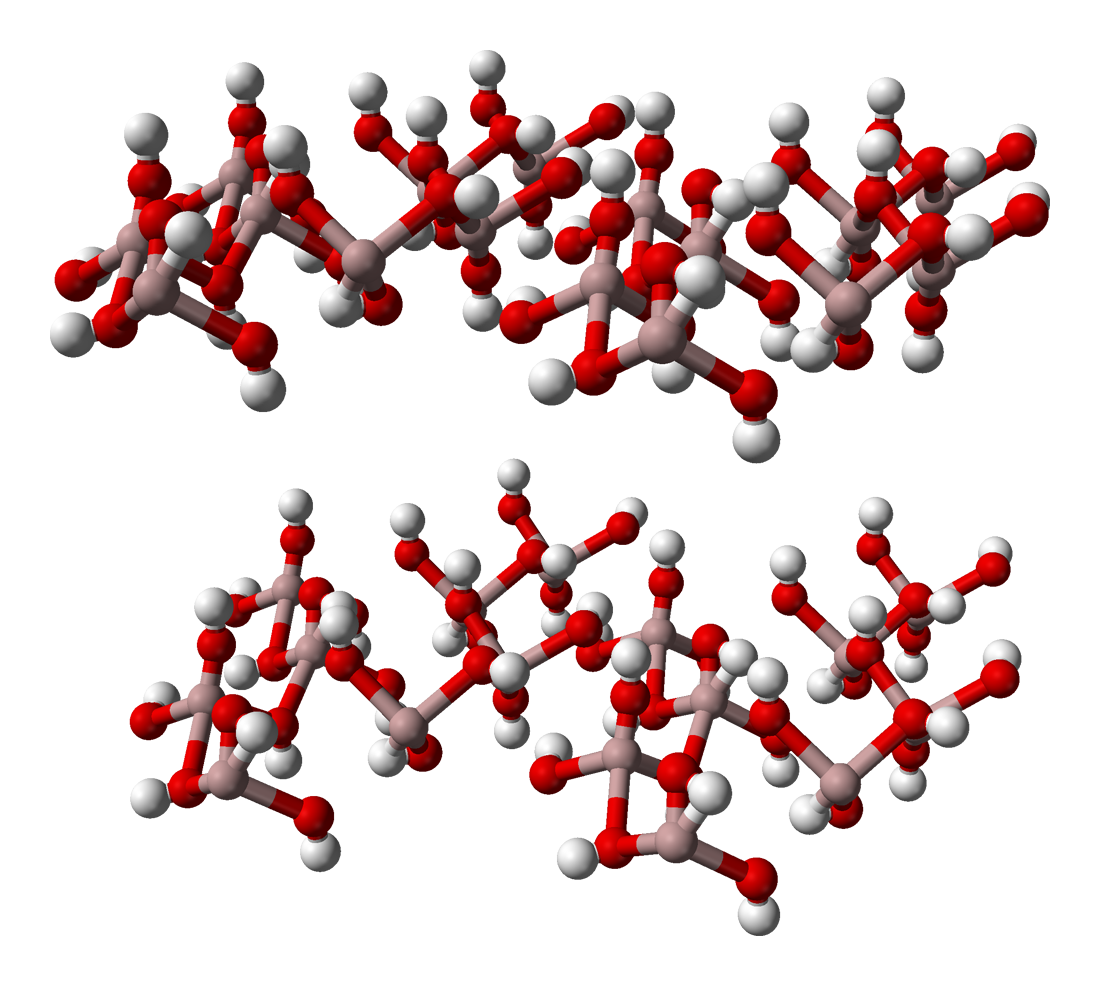
- Unit cell ball and stick model of aluminium hydroxide

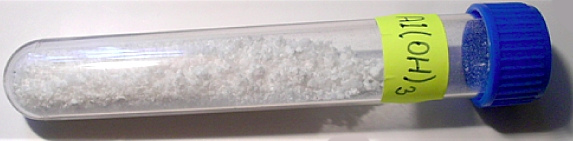
- Sample of aluminium hydroxide in a vial

Names
- Preferred IUPAC name Aluminium hydroxide
- Systematic IUPAC name Trihydroxidoaluminium
- Other names: Aluminic acid; Aluminic hydroxide; Alumanetriol; Aluminium(III) hydroxide; Aluminium hydroxide; Aluminium trihydroxide; Hydrated alumina; Orthoaluminic acid

Identifiers
CAS Number	21645-51-2
3D model (JSmol)	Interactive image
ChEBI	CHEBI:33130
ChEMBL	ChEMBL1200706
ChemSpider	8351587
DrugBank	DB06723
ECHA InfoCard	100.040.433
KEGG	D02416
PubChem CID	10176082
RTECS number	BD0940000
UNII	5QB0T2IUN0
CompTox Dashboard (EPA)	DTXSID2036405
- InChI: InChI=1S/Al.3H2O/h;3*1H2/q+3;;;/p-3 Key: WNROFYMDJYEPJX-UHFFFAOYSA-K A02AB02 (WHO) (algeldrate); InChI=1/Al.3H2O/h;3*1H2/q+3;;;/p-3 Key: WNROFYMDJYEPJX-DFZHHIFOAJ
- SMILES: [OH-].[OH-].[OH-].[Al+3]

Properties
Chemical formula	Al(OH)_{3}
Molar mass	78.003 g·mol^{−1}
Appearance	White amorphous powder
Density	2.42 g/cm^{3}, solid
Melting point	300 °C (572 °F; 573 K)
Solubility in water	0.0001 g/(100 mL)
Solubility product (K_{sp})	3×10^{−34}
Solubility	soluble in acids and alkalis
Acidity (pK_{a})	>7
Isoelectric point	7.7

Thermochemistry
Std enthalpy of formation (Δ_{f}H^{⦵}_{298})	−1277 kJ mol^{−1}

Pharmacology
ATC code	A02AB01 (WHO)

Hazards
- GHS labelling
Pictograms	no GHS pictograms
Hazard statements	no hazard statements
Precautionary statements	P261, P264, P271, P280, P304+P340, P305+P351+P338, P312, P337+P313
NFPA 704 (fire diamond)	1 0 0
Flash point	Non-flammable
- Lethal dose or concentration (LD, LC)
LD_{50} (median dose)	>5000 mg/kg (rat, oral)
Safety data sheet (SDS)	External MSDS

Related compounds
Other anions	None
Related compounds	Boric acid; Gallium(III) hydroxide; Indium(III) hydroxide; Thallium(III) hydroxide; Scandium(III) hydroxide; Sodium oxide; Aluminium oxide hydroxide
- Except where otherwise noted, data are given for materials in their standard state (at 25 °C [77 °F], 100 kPa). verify (what is ?) Infobox references

Aluminium hydroxide, Al(OH)_{3}, is a white chemical compound that is found as the mineral gibbsite (also known as hydrargillite) and its three much rarer polymorphs: bayerite, doyleite, and nordstrandite. Aluminium hydroxide is amphoteric, meaning it has both basic and acidic properties. Closely related are aluminium oxide hydroxide, AlO(OH), and aluminium oxide or alumina (Al_{2}O_{3}), the latter of which is also amphoteric. These compounds together are the major components of the aluminium ore bauxite. Aluminium hydroxide also forms a gelatinous precipitate in water.

== Structure ==
Al(OH)_{3} is built up of double layers of hydroxyl groups with aluminium ions occupying two-thirds of the octahedral holes between the two layers. Four polymorphs are recognized. All feature layers of octahedral aluminium hydroxide units, with hydrogen bonds between the layers. The polymorphs differ in terms of the stacking of the layers. The polymorphs have different crystal symmetries: for example, gibbsite is monoclinic, whereas doyleite is triclinic.

- gibbsite is also known as γ-Al(OH)_{3} or α-Al(OH)_{3}
- bayerite is also known as α-Al(OH)_{3} or β-alumina trihydrate
- nordstrandite is also known as Al(OH)_{3}
- doyleite

Hydrargillite, once thought to be aluminium hydroxide, is an aluminium phosphate. Nonetheless, both gibbsite and hydrargillite refer to the same polymorphism of aluminium hydroxide, with gibbsite used most commonly in the United States and hydrargillite used more often in Europe. Hydrargillite is named after the Greek words for water (hydr[o-]) and clay (argillos).

== Properties ==
Aluminium hydroxide is amphoteric. In acid, it acts as a Brønsted–Lowry base. It neutralizes the acid, yielding a salt:

3 HCl + Al(OH)_{3} → AlCl_{3} + 3 H_{2}O

In bases, it acts as a Lewis acid by binding hydroxide ions:

Al(OH)_{3} + OH^{−} → [Al(OH)_{4}]^{−}

== Production ==
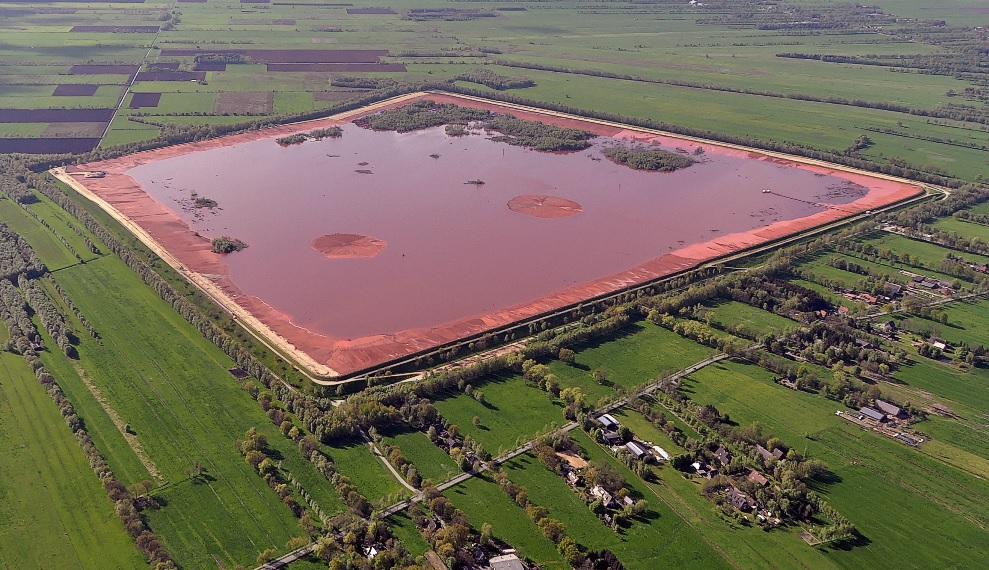
Red mud reservoirs (this one in Stade, Germany) contain the corrosive residues from the production of aluminium hydroxide.

Virtually all the aluminium hydroxide used commercially is manufactured by the Bayer process, which involves dissolving bauxite in sodium hydroxide at temperatures up to 270 °C (518 °F). The waste solid, bauxite tailings, is removed and aluminium hydroxide is precipitated from the remaining solution of sodium aluminate. This aluminium hydroxide can be converted to aluminium oxide or alumina by calcination.

The residue (or bauxite tailings), which is mostly composed of iron oxide, is highly caustic due to residual sodium hydroxide. It was historically stored in lagoons; this led to the Ajka alumina plant accident in 2010 in Hungary, where a dam bursting led to the drowning of nine people, and an additional 122 sought treatment for chemical burns. The mud contaminated 40 square kilometres (15 sq mi) of land and reached the Danube. While the mud was considered non-toxic due to low levels of heavy metals, the associated slurry had a pH of 13.

== Uses ==
=== Filler and fire retardant ===
Aluminium hydroxide finds use as a fire retardant filler for polymer applications. It is selected for these applications because it is colorless (like most polymers), inexpensive, and has good fire retardant properties. Magnesium hydroxide and mixtures of huntite and hydromagnesite are used similarly. These mixtures start to decompose at temperatures around 180 °C (356 °F) to 220 °C (428 °F) (depending on the type of aluminium hydroxide used), absorbing a considerable amount of heat in the process and giving off water vapour. The decomposition rate of aluminium hydroxide increases with an increase in temperature, with a reported maximum rate at 250 °C (482 °F).

In addition to behaving as a fire retardant, it is very effective as a smoke suppressant in a wide range of polymers, most especially in polyesters, acrylics, ethylene vinyl acetate, epoxies, polyvinyl chloride (PVC), rubber, as well as in wood-based products.

Aluminium hydroxide is used as filler in some artificial stone compound material, often in acrylic resin.

=== Mordant ===
In the past, freshly precipitated gelatinous aluminium hydroxide was widely used as a mordant for dyeing and calico printing because it can form insoluble coloured lake pigments with vegetable dyes.

=== Precursor to Al compounds ===
Aluminium hydroxide is a feedstock for the manufacture of other aluminium compounds: calcined aluminas, aluminium sulfate, polyaluminium chloride, aluminium chloride, zeolites, sodium aluminate, activated alumina, and aluminium nitrate.

Freshly precipitated aluminium hydroxide forms gels, which are the basis for the application of aluminium salts as flocculants in water purification. This gel crystallizes with time. Aluminium hydroxide gels can be dehydrated (e.g. using water-miscible non-aqueous solvents like ethanol) to form an amorphous aluminium hydroxide powder, which is readily soluble in acids. Heating converts it to activated aluminas, which are used as desiccants, adsorbent in gas purification, and catalyst supports.

=== Pharmaceutical ===
Under the generic name "algeldrate", aluminium hydroxide is used as an antacid in humans and animals (mainly cats and dogs). It is preferred over other alternatives such as sodium bicarbonate because Al(OH)_{3}, being insoluble, does not increase the pH of the stomach above 7, and hence does not trigger secretion of excess acid by the stomach. Brand names include Alu-Cap, Aludrox, Gaviscon or Pepsamar. It reacts with excess acid in the stomach, reducing the acidity of the stomach content, which may relieve the symptoms of ulcers, heartburn or dyspepsia. Such products can cause constipation, because the aluminium ions inhibit the contractions of smooth muscle cells in the gastrointestinal tract, slowing peristalsis and lengthening the time needed for stool to pass through the colon. Some such products are formulated to minimize such effects through the inclusion of equal concentrations of magnesium hydroxide or magnesium carbonate, which have counterbalancing laxative effects.

This compound is also used to control hyperphosphatemia (elevated phosphate, or phosphorus, levels in the blood) in people and animals suffering from kidney failure. Normally, the kidneys filter excess phosphate out from the blood, but kidney failure can cause phosphate to accumulate. The aluminium salt, when ingested, binds to phosphate in the intestines and reduce the amount of phosphorus that can be absorbed.

Precipitated aluminium hydroxide is included as an adjuvant in some vaccines (e.g. anthrax vaccine). One of the well-known brands of aluminium hydroxide adjuvant is Alhydrogel, made by Brenntag Biosector. Since it absorbs protein well, it also functions to stabilize vaccines by preventing the proteins in the vaccine from precipitating or sticking to the walls of the container during storage. Aluminium hydroxide is sometimes called "alum", a term generally reserved for one of several sulfates.

Vaccine formulations containing aluminium hydroxide stimulate the immune system by inducing the release of uric acid, an immunological danger signal. This strongly attracts certain types of monocytes which differentiate into dendritic cells. The dendritic cells pick up the antigen, carry it to lymph nodes, and stimulate T cells and B cells. It appears to contribute to induction of a good Th2 response, so is useful for immunizing against pathogens that are blocked by antibodies. However, it has little capacity to stimulate cellular (Th1) immune responses, important for protection against many pathogens, nor is it useful when the antigen is peptide-based.

=== Miscellaneous ===
Aluminium hydroxide is used in chromatography.

== Safety ==
In the 1960s and 1970s it was speculated that aluminium was related to various neurological disorders, including Alzheimer's disease. Since then, multiple epidemiological studies have found no connection between exposure to environmental or swallowed aluminium and neurological disorders, though injected aluminium was not looked at in these studies.

Neural disorders were found in experiments on mice motivated by Gulf War illness (GWI). Aluminium hydroxide injected in doses equivalent to those administered to the United States military showed increased reactive astrocytes, increased apoptosis of motor neurons, and microglial proliferation within the spinal cord and cortex.
