= Indium(III) phosphate =

Names
- Other names Indium orthophosphate

Identifiers
CAS Number	14693-82-4
3D model (JSmol)	Interactive image
ChemSpider	7991442
EC Number	681-096-7
PubChem CID	9815692
CompTox Dashboard (EPA)	DTXSID60431179
- InChI: InChI=1S/In.H3O4P/c;1-5(2,3)4/h;(H3,1,2,3,4)/q+3;/p-3 Key: UJXZVRRCKFUQKG-UHFFFAOYSA-K
- SMILES: [O-]P(=O)([O-])[O-].[In+3]

Properties
Chemical formula	InPO_{4}
Molar mass	209.79 g/mol
Appearance	White solid
Density	4.9 g/cm^{3}
Solubility in water	Practically insoluble in water

Structure
Crystal structure	Orthorhombic
Space group	Cmcm, No. 63
- Except where otherwise noted, data are given for materials in their standard state (at 25 °C [77 °F], 100 kPa). Infobox references

Indium(III) phosphate is an inorganic compound of indium and phosphate with the chemical formula InPO_{4}. It is a white solid that is practically insoluble in water.

== Structure and properties ==
At ambient pressure, anhydrous InPO_{4} crystallizes in the orthorhombic crystal system in space group Cmcm. Its structure is of the CrVO_{4} type: In^{3+} is six-coordinate in InO_{6} octahedra, while phosphorus is tetrahedrally coordinated in PO_{4} groups.

At pressures above about 12 GPa, InPO_{4} undergoes a structural transformation. High-pressure diffraction studies indicate coexistence of tetragonal zircon-type (I4_{1}/amd) and scheelite-type (I4_{1}/a) phases together with the ambient orthorhombic phase. In the high-pressure phases, indium becomes eight-coordinate while phosphorus remains four-coordinate.

Several hydrates are known. InPO_{4}·H_{2}O crystallizes in the triclinic crystal system, space group P1̅, with lattice parameters a = 5.4342 Å, b = 5.5508 Å, c = 6.5446 Å, α = 97.593°, β = 94.558° and γ = 107.565°. Its three-dimensional framework contains In_{2}O_{8}(H_{2}O)_{2} dimers linked by PO_{4} tetrahedra.

On heating between about 370 and 480 °C, the monohydrate loses its coordinated water to form anhydrous InPO_{4}. This dehydration corresponds structurally to condensation of the hydrated indium dimers into chains of edge-sharing InO_{6} octahedra.

The dihydrate InPO_{4}·2H_{2}O is also polymorphic. A monoclinic form with space group P2_{1}/n is isostructural with metavariscite-type AlPO_{4}·2H_{2}O, and an orthorhombic form with space group Pbca is also known.

== Preparation ==
Indium(III) phosphate can be prepared by precipitation from solutions containing In^{3+} and phosphate ions. For example, indium(III) chloride reacts with phosphoric acid to form InPO_{4}:

InCl_{3} + H_{3}PO_{4} → InPO_{4}↓ + 3 HCl

More generally, soluble indium salts form precipitates of indium phosphate when treated with acidic or neutral soluble phosphates in neutral or weakly acidic solution.

Hydrated phases can be prepared hydrothermally. A monoclinic dihydrate, InPO_{4}·2H_{2}O, has been obtained from indium(III) hydroxide and phosphoric acid in the presence of hydrofluoric acid and quinuclidine.

== Applications ==
Indium phosphate has been investigated for use in electronic and optoelectronic materials. Its pressure-induced structural changes and the associated changes in indium coordination are of interest for understanding the behaviour of phosphate materials under extreme conditions.
