= Gallium acetylacetonate =

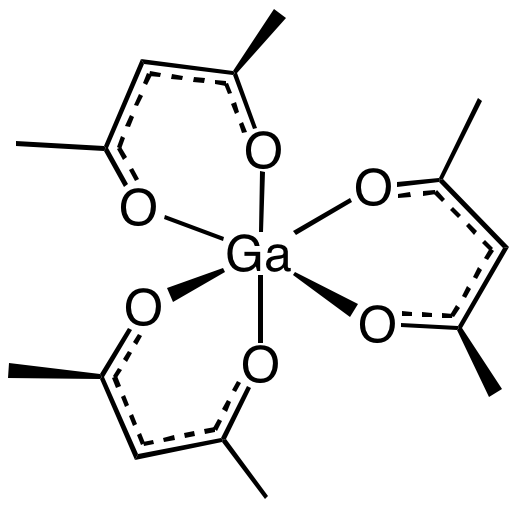

Names
- IUPAC name (Z)-4-Bis{[(Z)-4-oxopent-2-en-2-yl]oxy}gallanyloxypent-3-en-2-one
- Other names Gallium acetylacetonate

Identifiers
CAS Number	14405-43-7
3D model (JSmol)	Interactive image
ChemSpider	4588244
ECHA InfoCard	100.034.873
PubChem CID	16717626
- InChI: InChI=1S/3C5H8O2.Ga/c3*1-4(6)3-5(2)7;/h3*3,6H,1-2H3;/q;;;+3/p-3/b3*4-3-; Key: ZVYYAYJIGYODSD-LNTINUHCSA-K
- SMILES: C/C(=C/C(=O)C)/O[Ga](O/C(=C\C(=O)C)/C)O/C(=C\C(=O)C)/C

Properties
Chemical formula	GaC_{15}H_{21}O_{6}
Molar mass	367.05 g/mol
Appearance	White solid
Density	1.42 g/cm^{3}
- Except where otherwise noted, data are given for materials in their standard state (at 25 °C [77 °F], 100 kPa). Infobox references

Gallium acetylacetonate, also referred to as Ga(acac)_{3}, is a coordination complex with formula Ga(C_{5}H_{7}O_{2})_{3}. This gallium complex with three acetylacetonate ligands is used in research. The molecule has D_{3} symmetry, being isomorphous with other octahedral tris(acetylacetonate)s.

== Uses ==
Gallium oxide thin films can be produced by atomic layer epitaxy (ALE) by combining gallium acetylacetonate with either water or ozone as the precursor. Ga(acac)_{3} can also be used for low temperature growth of high purity gallium nitride nano-wires and nano-needles.
