= Johann Böhm (chemist) =

Czech-German chemist (1895–1952)

- Born: 20 January 1895; České Budějovice, Bohemia, Austria-Hungary
- Died: 27 November 1952 (aged 57); Prague, Czechoslovakia
- Citizenship: Czechoslovak
- Education: German Polytechnic University in Prague
- Known for: Boehmite
- Scientific career
- Fields: Chemistry
- Workplaces: Berlin, Freiburg, Prague, Rybitví

Johann Böhm (20 January 1895 – 27 November 1952) was a Czech chemist of German ethnicity who focused on photochemistry and radiography. The aluminum-containing mineral boehmite (or böhmite) was named after him.

== Biography ==
Böhm studied at the German Polytechnic University in Prague and then worked with Fritz Haber in Berlin where he re-designed and considerably improved the Weissenberg x-ray goniometer. In 1926, George de Hevesy, then a professor at the University of Freiburg, invited Böhm to co-operate with him on a series of experiments in spectrographic analysis. Afterwards Böhm worked at Freiburg University as an assistant and later as an associate professor. From October 1935 he was a professor of physical chemistry at the German University in Prague. After World War II Böhm was allowed to remain in the country and become again a citizen of Czechoslovakia because he had been active in the anti-Nazi movement supporting Czech scientists such as Jaroslav Heyrovský, but was not permitted to continue his academic career. He worked in an industrial research institute in Rybitví (Výzkumný ústav organických syntéz). A few days before his death he was appointed Corresponding Member of the Czechoslovak Academy of Sciences.

He died in Prague on 27 November 1952.
