= Gallium acetate =

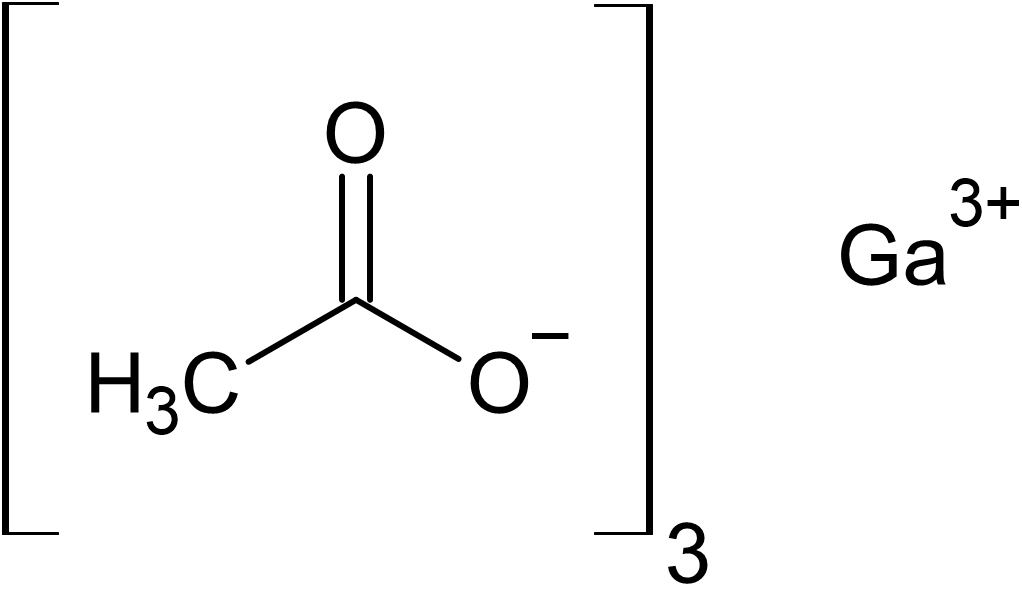
- Gallium acetate

Names
- IUPAC names Tetra-μ^{2}-acetatodiaquadigallium(III), diacetyloxygallanyl acetate gallium(3+) triacetate
- Other names: Gallium ethanoate; Gallium triacetate; Gallium(III) acetate

Identifiers
CAS Number	2571-06-4
3D model (JSmol)	Interactive image
ChemSpider	144647
ECHA InfoCard	100.018.106
EC Number	219-915-3
PubChem CID	16704853
CompTox Dashboard (EPA)	DTXSID7062530
- InChI: InChI=1S/3C2H4O2.Ga/c3*1-2(3)4;/h3*1H3,(H,3,4);/q;;;+3/p-3 Key: FYWVTSQYJIPZLW-UHFFFAOYSA-K
- SMILES: CC(=O)O[Ga](OC(=O)C)OC(=O)C

Properties
Chemical formula	Ga(O_{2}C_{2}H_{3})_{3}
Molar mass	246.85
Appearance	white crystals
Density	1.57 g/cm/^{3}
Melting point	N/A
Boiling point	117.1C

Hazards
- GHS labelling
Pictograms	(GHS05: Corrosive) (GHS07: Exclamation mark)
Signal word	Danger
Hazard statements	H314, H335
Precautionary statements	P261, P280, P304+P340, P305+P351+P338, P405, P501
- Except where otherwise noted, data are given for materials in their standard state (at 25 °C [77 °F], 100 kPa). Infobox references

Gallium acetate is a salt composed of a gallium atom trication and three acetate groups as anions where gallium exhibits the +3 oxidation state. It has a chemical formula of Ga(CH_{3}COO)_{3} although it can be informally referred to as GaAc_{3} because Ac is an informal symbol for acetate. Gallium is moderately water-soluble and decomposes to gallium oxide when heated to around 70 °C. Gallium acetate, like other acetate compounds, is a good precursor to ultra-pure compounds, catalysts and nanoscale materials. Gallium acetate is being considered as a substitute in de-icing compounds like calcium chloride and magnesium chloride.

== Preparation ==
Gallium acetate can be formed using a neutralization reaction (acetic acid reacts with gallium oxide or gallium hydroxide):

6CH_{3}COOH + Ga_{2}O_{3} → 2Ga(CH_{3}COO)_{3} + 3H_{2}O

3CH_{3}COOH + Ga(OH)_{3} → Ga(CH_{3}COO)_{3} + 3H_{2}O

Gallium can also be refluxed in acetic acid for several weeks to produce gallium acetate.

== Applications ==
It can also be used in conjunction with acetylacetonate bis(thiosemicarbazone) to create radiogallium-acetylacetonate bis(thiosemicarbazone) complex. It can be used in tumor imaging.

== See also ==
- Gallium
- Acetic acid
