= Diaspore =

Aluminium hydroxide oxide mineral

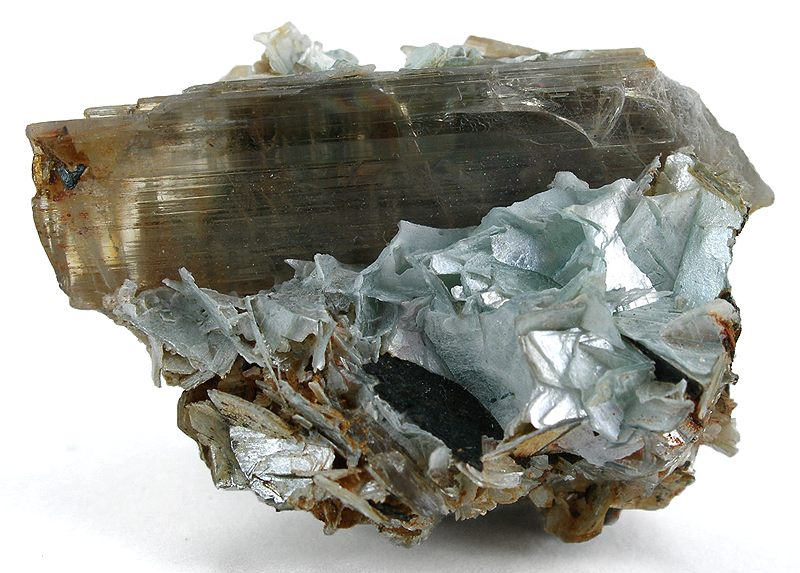

General
- Category: Oxide mineral
- Formula: α-AlO(OH)
- IMA symbol: Dsp
- Strunz classification: 4.FD.10
- Crystal system: Orthorhombic
- Crystal class: Dipyramidal (mmm); H–M symbol: (2/m 2/m 2/m)
- Space group: Pbnm
- Unit cell: a = 4.4007(6) Å b = 9.4253(13) Å c = 2.8452(3) Å; Z = 4

Identification
- Color: White, pale gray, colorless, greenish gray, brown, pale yellow, pink, purple; may exhibit color change
- Crystal habit: Platy, elongated to acicular crystals; also stalactitic, foliated, scaly, disseminated, and massive
- Twinning: Forms heart shaped twins on {021} or pseudohexagonal aggregates
- Cleavage: {010} perfect, {110} distinct, {100} in traces
- Fracture: Conchoidal
- Tenacity: Very brittle
- Mohs scale hardness: 6.5–7.0
- Luster: Adamantine, vitreous, pearly on cleavage faces
- Diaphaneity: Transparent to translucent
- Specific gravity: 3.1–3.4
- Optical properties: Biaxial (+)
- Refractive index: n_{α} = 1.682–1.706 n_{β} = 1.705–1.725 n_{γ} = 1.730–1.752
- Birefringence: δ = 0.048
- Pleochroism: Strong
- 2V angle: Measured: 84–86° Calculated: 80–84°
- Dispersion: r < v, weak
- Fusibility: Infusible
- Solubility: Insoluble
- Other characteristics: Decrepitates releasing water in closed tube on heating

Diaspore (/ˈdaɪ.əˌspɔːr/) – also called diasporite, empholite, kayserite, or tanatarite – is an aluminium hydroxide oxide mineral, α-AlO(OH), crystallizing in the orthorhombic system and isomorphous with goethite. It occurs sometimes as flattened crystals, but usually as lamellar or scaly masses, the flattened surface being a direction of perfect cleavage on which the lustre is markedly pearly in character. It is colorless or greyish-white, yellowish, sometimes violet in color, and varies from translucent to transparent. It may be readily distinguished from other colorless transparent minerals with a perfect cleavage and pearly luster (e.g. mica, talc, brucite, and gypsum) by its greater hardness of 6.5–7. Its specific gravity is 3.4. When heated before the blowpipe, it decrepitates violently, breaking up into white pearly scales.

The mineral occurs as an alteration product of corundum or emery and is found in granular limestone and other crystalline rocks. Well-developed crystals are found in the emery deposits of the Ural Mountains and at Chester, Massachusetts, and in kaolin at Schemnitz in Hungary. If obtainable in large quantity, it would be of economic importance as a source of aluminium.

Diaspore, along with gibbsite and boehmite, is a major component of the aluminium ore bauxite.

It was first described in 1801 for an occurrence in Mramorsk Zavod, Sverdlovskaya Oblast, Middle Urals, Russia. The name, which was coined by René Just Haüy, is from the Ancient Greek διασπείρω meaning "to scatter", in allusion to its decrepitation on heating.

Csarite, ottomanite, Turkizite and zultanite are trade names for gem-quality diaspore (also known as Turkish diaspore) from the İlbir Mountains of southwest Turkey.
