= Boehmite =

Mineral

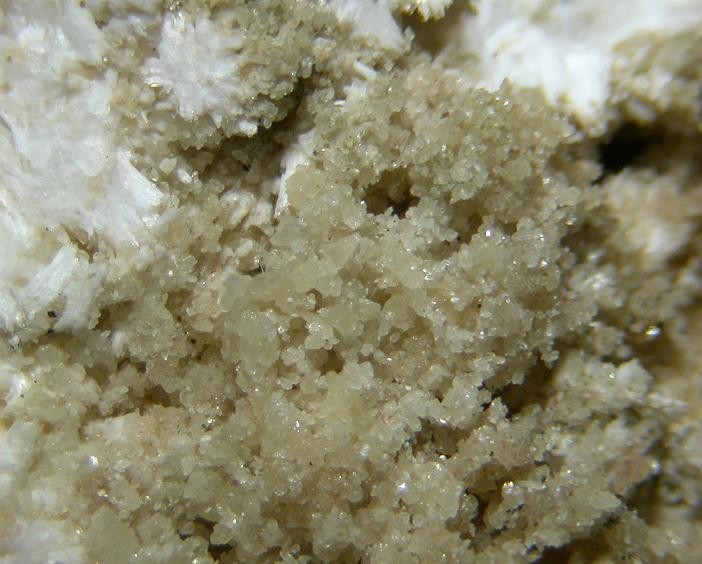
- Böhmite and Natrolite from Sagåsen (Strandåsen), Mørje, Porsgrunn, Telemark, Norway (Field of view 10 mm)

General
- Category: Oxide mineral
- Formula: γ-AlO(OH)
- IMA symbol: Bhm
- Strunz classification: 4.FE.15
- Dana classification: 6.1.2.1
- Crystal system: Orthorhombic
- Crystal class: Dipyramidal (mmm); H-M symbol: (2/m 2/m 2/m)
- Space group: Amam
- Unit cell: a = 3.693 Å, b = 12.221 Å, c = 2.865 Å; Z = 4

Identification
- Color: White, pale greyish brown; yellowish or reddish when impure; colorless in thin section
- Crystal habit: Tabular crystal rare, fine grained in pisolitic aggregates or disseminated
- Cleavage: Very good on {010}, good on {100}, and poor on {001}
- Fracture: Uneven
- Tenacity: Brittle
- Mohs scale hardness: 3.5
- Luster: Vitreous, pearly on {010}
- Streak: White
- Diaphaneity: Translucent
- Specific gravity: 3.02–3.05
- Optical properties: Biaxial (+)
- Refractive index: n_{α} = 1.644 – 1.648 n_{β} = 1.654 – 1.657 n_{γ} = 1.661 – 1.668
- Birefringence: δ = 0.017 – 0.020
- 2V angle: Measured: 74° to 88°, Calculated: 80°
- Dispersion: weak

Boehmite or böhmite is an aluminium oxide hydroxide (γ-AlO(OH)) mineral, a component of the aluminium ore bauxite. It is dimorphous with diaspore. It crystallizes in the orthorhombic dipyramidal system and is typically massive in habit. It is white with tints of yellow, green, brown or red due to impurities. It has a vitreous to pearly luster, a Mohs hardness of 3 to 3.5 and a specific gravity of 3.00 to 3.07. It is colorless in thin section, optically biaxial positive with refractive indices of nα = 1.644 – 1.648, nβ = 1.654 – 1.657 and nγ = 1.661 – 1.668.

Boehmite occurs in tropical laterites and bauxites developed on alumino-silicate bedrock. It also occurs as a hydrothermal alteration product of corundum and nepheline. It occurs with kaolinite, gibbsite and diaspore in bauxite deposits; and with nepheline, gibbsite, diaspore, natrolite and analcime in nepheline pegmatites. Industrially, it is used as an inexpensive flame retardant additive for fire-safe polymers.

It was first described by J. de Lapparent in 1927 for an occurrence in the bauxites of Mas Rouge, Les Baux-de-Provence, France, and named for the Bohemian-German chemist Johann Böhm (1895–1952) who carried out X-ray studies of aluminium oxide hydroxides in 1925 (and not for the German geologist Johannes Böhm (1857–1938) as often stated).

== See also ==
- List of minerals
- List of minerals named after people
- Pseudoboehmite
