= Zultanite =

Gem variety of disaspore

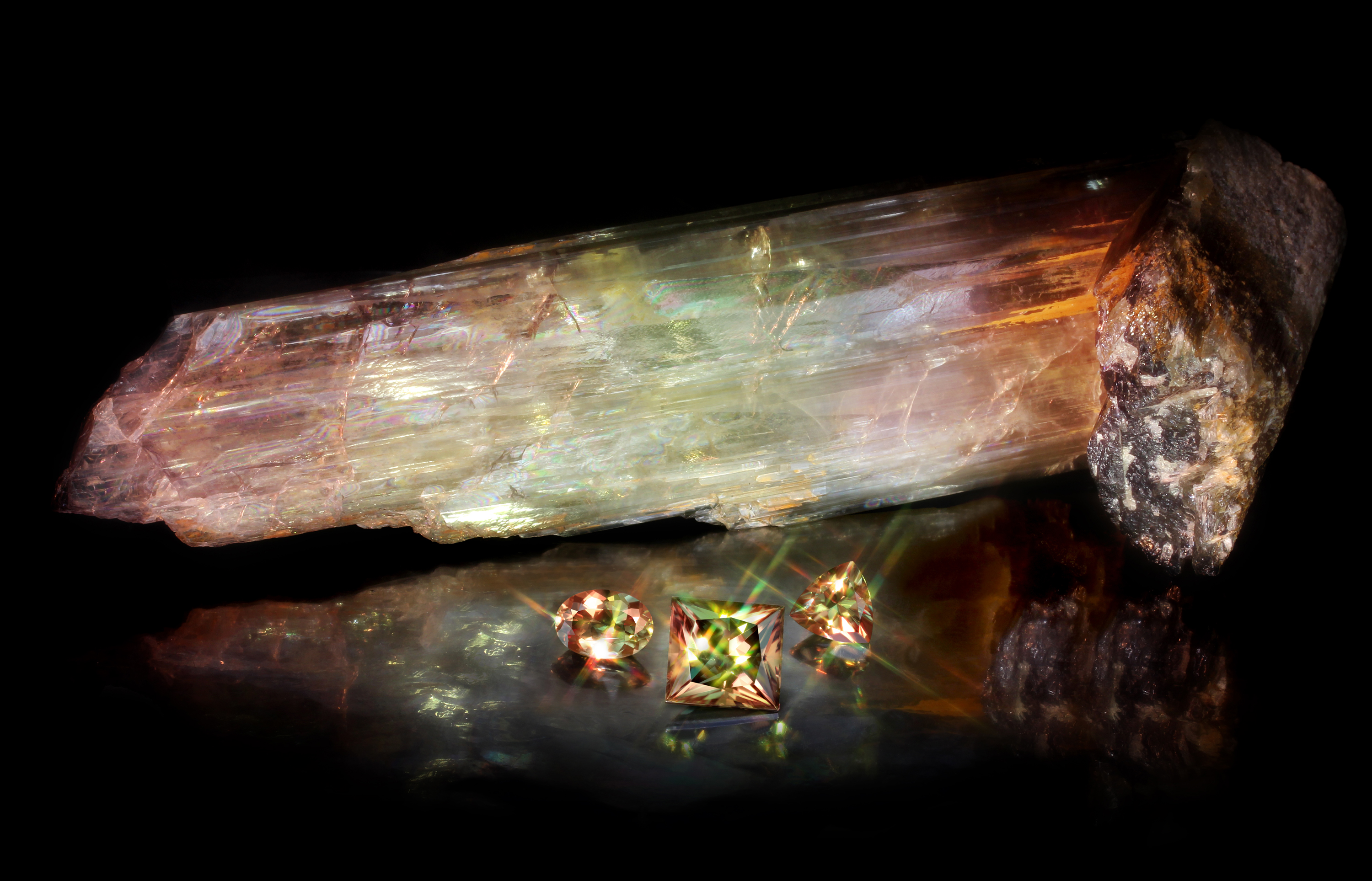
Zultanite rough crystal and gemstones

Zultanite is a gem variety of the mineral diaspore, mined in the İlbir Mountains of southwest Turkiye at an elevation of over 4,000 feet. The mineral's name is a tradename and is equivalent to the tradename Csarite.

Turkey is the only place where the gem quality material has been found, and at the Ilbir Dağ deposit it has been "formed in open spaces by hydrothermal remobilization of bauxite components". The gem quality material was first discovered in the early 1980s.

Zultanite has a hardness of 6.5 to 7. Depending on its light source, zultanite's color varies between a yellowish green, light gold, and purplish pink. Its color can be pastel green in outdoor light and beige pink in incandescent light.
