= Olation =

In inorganic chemistry, olation is the process by which metal ions form polymeric oxides in aqueous solution. The phenomenon is important for understanding the relationship between metal aquo complexes and metal oxides, which are represented by many minerals.

At low pH, many metal ions exist in aqueous solution as aquo complexes with the formula [M(H_{2}O)_{6}]^{3+}. As the pH increases, one O-H bond ionizes to give the hydroxide complex, the conjugate base of the parent hexaaqua complex:

[M(H_{2}O)_{6}]^{3+} ⇌ [M(H_{2}O)_{5}OH]^{2+} + H^{+}

The hydroxo complex is poised to undergo olation, which is initiated by displacement of one water by the hydroxide ligand on another complex:

[M(H_{2}O)_{6}]^{3+} + [M(H_{2}O)_{5}OH]^{2+} ⇌ [M_{2}(H_{2}O)_{10}(μ−OH)]^{5+} + H_{2}O

In this product, the hydroxide ligand bridges between the two metals, this bridge is denoted with the symbol μ. In the resulting 5+ ion, the remaining water and hydroxo ligands are highly acidic and the ionization and condensation processes can continue at still higher pHs.

The formation of the oxo-dimer is a process called oxolation:

2 [L_{n}MOH] ⇌ L_{n}M−O−ML_{n} + H_{2}O, where L = ligand

Ultimately olation and oxolation lead to metal oxides:

2 [M(H_{2}O)_{6}]^{3+} → M_{2}O_{3} + 9 H_{2}O + 6 H^{+}

Olation and oxolation are responsible for the formation of many natural and synthetic materials. Such materials are usually insoluble polymers, but some, the polyoxometallates, are discrete and molecular.

== Olation and leather tanning ==
One application where olation is important is leather tanning using chromium(III) sulfate. This salt dissolves to give hexaaquachromium(III) cation, [Cr(H_{2}O)_{6}]^{3+} and sulfate anions. [Cr(H_{2}O)_{6}]^{3+} acts as an acid according to the reaction:

[Cr(H_{2}O)_{6}]^{3+} ⇌ [Cr(H_{2}O)_{5}OH]^{2+} + H^{+}; K_{eq} ~ 10^{−4} M

Thus, higher pH favors [Cr(H_{2}O)_{5}OH]^{2+}. This hydroxy complex can undergo olation:

[Cr(H_{2}O)_{6}]^{3+} + [Cr(H_{2}O)_{5}OH]^{2+} → [(Cr(H_{2}O)_{5})_{2}(μ-OH)]^{5+} + H_{2}O
2[Cr(H_{2}O)_{5}OH]^{2+} → [(Cr(H_{2}O)_{4})_{2}(μ-OH)_{2}]^{4+} + 2 H_{2}O

The "diol" (second reaction) is favored and is accelerated by heat and high pH. The balance of these two factors, temperature and pH of the solution, along with the concentration of chromium(III), influence the continued polymerization of [(Cr(H_{2}O)_{4})_{2}(μ-OH)_{2}]^{4+}. The chromium(III) hydroxide is susceptible to oxolation:

[(Cr(H_{2}O)_{4})_{2}(μ-OH)_{2}]^{4+} → [(Cr(H_{2}O)_{4})_{2}(μ-O)_{2}]^{2+} + 2 H^{+}

Products of oxolation are less susceptible to acidic cleavage than the hydroxy bridge. The resulting clusters are active in crosslinking the protein in tanning, which essentially involves the cross-linking of the collagen subunits. The actual chemistry of [Cr(H_{2}O)_{6}]^{3+} is more complex in the tanning bath rather than in water due to the presence of a variety of ligands. Some ligands include the sulfate anion, the collagen's carboxyl groups, amine groups from the side chains of the amino acids, as well as "masking agents." Masking agents are carboxylic acids, such as acetic acid, used to suppress formation of polychromium(III) chains. Masking agents allow the tanner to further increase the pH to increase collagen's reactivity without inhibiting the penetration of the chromium(III) complexes. The crosslinks formed by the polychromium species are approximately 17 Å long.
