= Indium(III) nitrate =

Identifiers
CAS Number	anhydrous: 13770-61-1; monohydrate: 13465-14-0; trihydrate: 15650-88-1
3D model (JSmol)	anhydrous: Interactive image; monohydrate: Interactive image; trihydrate: Interactive image; tetrahydrate: Interactive image
ChemSpider	anhydrous: 24472; monohydrate: 2341257; trihydrate: 26948018
ECHA InfoCard	100.033.979
EC Number	anhydrous: 237-393-5
PubChem CID	anhydrous: 26265; monohydrate: 3084148; trihydrate: 91886655; tetrahydrate: 138753438; pentahydrate: 22446589
RTECS number	anhydrous: NL1750000
UNII	anhydrous: WOP84073FA
CompTox Dashboard (EPA)	anhydrous: DTXSID7065621
- InChI: InChI=1S/In.3NO3/c;3*2-1(3)4/q+3;3*-1 Key: LKRFCKCBYVZXTC-UHFFFAOYSA-N; monohydrate: InChI=1S/In.3NO3.H2O/c;3*2-1(3)4;/h;;;;1H2/q+3;3*-1; Key: YZZFBYAKINKKFM-UHFFFAOYSA-N; trihydrate: InChI=1S/In.3NO3.3H2O/c;3*2-1(3)4;;;/h;;;;3*1H2/q+3;3*-1;;; Key: HVDZMISZAKTZFP-UHFFFAOYSA-N; tetrahydrate: InChI=1S/In.3NO3.4H2O/c;3*2-1(3)4;;;;/h;;;;4*1H2/q+3;3*-1;;;; Key: ZYYDOSLSINDXIQ-UHFFFAOYSA-N
- SMILES: anhydrous: [N+](=O)([O-])[O-].[N+](=O)([O-])[O-].[N+](=O)([O-])[O-].[In+3]; monohydrate: [N+](=O)([O-])O[In](O[N+](=O)[O-])O[N+](=O)[O-].O; trihydrate: [N+](=O)([O-])O[In](O[N+](=O)[O-])O[N+](=O)[O-].O.O.O; tetrahydrate: [N+](=O)([O-])O[In](O[N+](=O)[O-])O[N+](=O)[O-].O.O.O.O

Properties
Chemical formula	In(NO_{3})_{3}
Molar mass	300.83 g/mol
Appearance	White solid
Density	2.43 g/cm^{3} (pentahydrate)
Melting point	100 °C (212 °F; 373 K) (decomposes, hydrate)
Solubility in water	Soluble

Structure
Crystal structure	Monoclinic
Space group	C2/c
Lattice constant	a = 10.35 Å, b = 9.17 Å, c = 11.25 Å α = 90°, β = 91.05°, γ = 90°
Lattice volume (V)	1068 Å^{3}

Hazards
- GHS labelling
Pictograms	(GHS03: Oxidizing) (GHS07: Exclamation mark)
Signal word	Warning
Hazard statements	H272, H315, H319, H335
Precautionary statements	P210, P220, P221, P261, P264, P271, P280, P302+P352, P304+P340, P305+P351+P338, P312, P321, P332+P313, P337+P313, P362, P370+P378, P403+P233, P405, P501
- Except where otherwise noted, data are given for materials in their standard state (at 25 °C [77 °F], 100 kPa). Infobox references

Indium(III) nitrate is a nitrate salt of indium which forms various hydrates. Only the pentahydrate has been crystallographically verified. Other hydrates are also reported in literature, such as the trihydrate.

== Production and reactions ==
Indium(III) nitrate hydrate is produced by the dissolution of indium metal in concentrated nitric acid followed by evaporation of the solution:

In + 4 HNO_{3} → In(NO_{3})_{3} + NO + 2 H_{2}O

The hydrate first decomposes to a basic salt and then to indium(III) oxide at 240 °C. Anhydrous indium(III) nitrate is claimed to be produced by the reaction of anhydrous indium(III) chloride and dinitrogen pentoxide.

In the presence of excess nitrate ions, indium(III) nitrate converts to the [In(NO_{3})_{4}]^{−} ion.

The hydrolysis of indium(III) nitrate yields indium(III) hydroxide. It also reacts with sodium tungstate to form In(OH)WO_{4}, [In(OH)_{2}]_{2}WO_{4}, NaInWO_{4} or In_{2}(WO_{4})_{3} depending on pH.

== Structure ==
Only the pentahydrate has been structurally elucidated. The pentahydrate consists of octahedral [In(NO_{3})(H_{2}O)_{5}]^{2+} centers as well as two nitrates and is monoclinic.
