= Thallium(I) hydroxide =

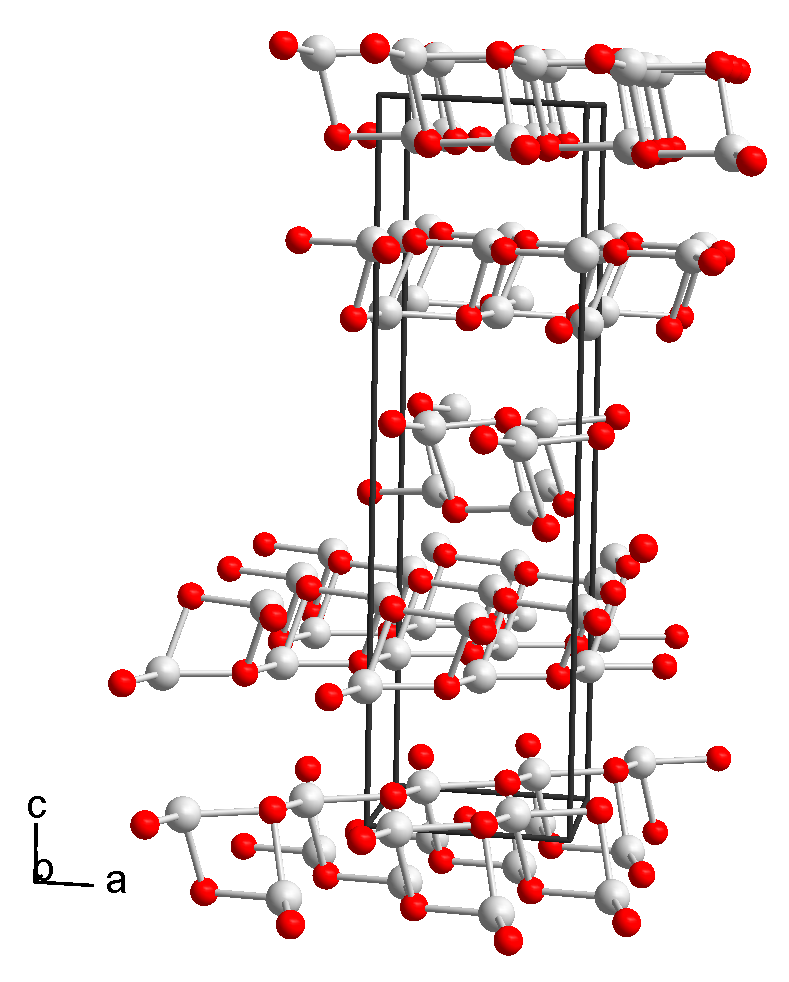

Names
- IUPAC name thallium(I) hydroxide
- Other names thallous hydroxide

Identifiers
| CAS Number | 12026-06-1 |
| 3D model (JSmol) | Interactive image |
| ChemSpider | 141413 |
| ECHA InfoCard | 100.031.540 |
| EC Number | 234-708-8 |
| PubChem CID | 160963 |
| UNII | 847N2ZKW5S |
| CompTox Dashboard (EPA) | DTXSID10894114 |
- InChI: InChI=1S/H2O.Tl/h1H2;/q;+1/p-1 Key: QGYXCSSUHCHXHB-UHFFFAOYSA-M; InChI=1/H2O.Tl/h1H2;/q;+1/p-1 Key: QGYXCSSUHCHXHB-REWHXWOFAR
- SMILES: [Tl+].[OH-]

Properties
| Chemical formula | TlOH |
| Molar mass | 221.39 g·mol^{−1} |
| Appearance | yellow needles |
| Density | 7.44 g/cm^{3} |
| Melting point | decomposes at 139°C |
| Solubility in water | 34.3 g/(100 g) at 18°C |

Thermochemistry
| Std molar entropy (S^{⦵}_{298}) | 88.0 J/(mol·K) |
| Std enthalpy of formation (Δ_{f}H^{⦵}_{298}) | −238.9 kJ/mol |

Hazards
- Occupational safety and health (OHS/OSH)
| Main hazards | Very toxic Corrosive Dangerous for the environment |
- GHS labelling
| Pictograms | (GHS06: Toxic) (GHS08: Health hazard) (GHS09: Environmental hazard) |
| Signal word | Danger |
| Hazard statements | H300, H330, H373, H411 |
| Precautionary statements | P260, P264, P270, P271, P273, P284, P301+P310, P304+P340, P310, P314, P320, P330, P391, P403+P233, P405, P501 |
| NFPA 704 (fire diamond) | 4 0 1 COR |
- Except where otherwise noted, data are given for materials in their standard state (at 25 °C [77 °F], 100 kPa). verify (what is ?) Infobox references

Thallium(I) hydroxide, also called thallous hydroxide, is a chemical compound with the chemical formula TlOH. It is a hydroxide of thallium, with thallium in oxidation state +1. It is a thallium(I) salt of water. It consists of thallium(I) cations Tl^{+} and hydroxide anions OH^{−}.

== Synthesis ==
Thallium(I) hydroxide is obtained from the decomposition of thallium(I) ethoxide in water.

CH_{3}CH_{2}OTl + H_{2}O → TlOH + CH_{3}CH_{2}OH

This can also be done by direct reaction of thallium with ethanol and oxygen gas.

4 Tl + 2 CH_{3}CH_{2}OH + O_{2} → 2 CH_{3}CH_{2}OTl + 2 TlOH

Another method is the reaction between thallium(I) sulfate and barium hydroxide.

Tl_{2}SO_{4} + Ba(OH)_{2} → 2 TlOH + BaSO_{4}

== Properties ==
Thallium(I) hydroxide is a strong base; it dissociates to thallium(I) cations, Tl^{+}, and hydroxide anions, OH^{−}, except in strongly basic conditions. Tl^{+} cation resembles an alkali metal cation, such as Li^{+}, Na^{+} or K^{+}.
