= Rybitví =

- Municipality
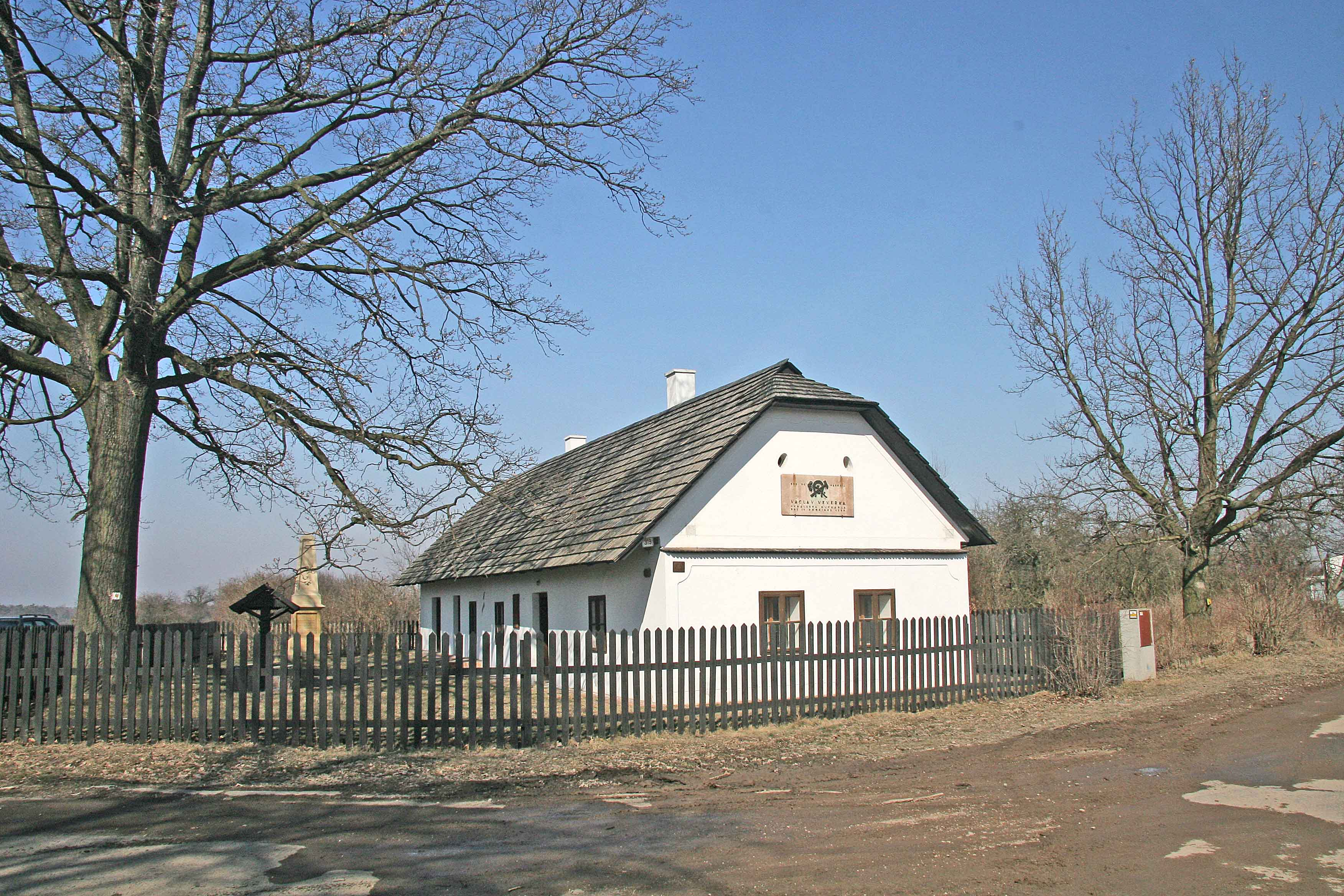
- Birth house of Veverka cousins

- Flag Coat of arms

- Location in the Czech Republic
- Coordinates: 50°3′37″N 15°42′17″E
- Country: Czech Republic
- Region: Pardubice
- District: Pardubice
- First mentioned: 1377

Area
  - Total: 5.25 km^{2} (2.03 sq mi)
- Elevation: 219 m (719 ft)

Population (2026-01-01)
  - Total: 1,529
  - Density: 291/km^{2} (754/sq mi)
- Time zone: UTC+1 (CET)
  - Summer (DST): UTC+2 (CEST)
- Postal code: 533 54
- Website: www.rybitvi.cz

Rybitví (German: Rybitew) is a municipality and village in Pardubice District in the Pardubice Region of the Czech Republic. It has about 1,500 inhabitants.

== Demographics ==
Historical population
Year	Pop.	±%
1869	337	—
1880	400	+18.7%
1890	402	+0.5%
1900	384	−4.5%
1910	426	+10.9%
1921	407	−4.5%
1930	471	+15.7%
1950	1,159	+146.1%
1961	2,044	+76.4%
1970	2,088	+2.2%
1980	1,739	−16.7%
1991	1,405	−19.2%
2001	1,319	−6.1%
2011	1,332	+1.0%
2021	1,345	+1.0%
Source: Censuses
