= Akdalaite =

Very rare mineral

General
- Category: Minerals
- Formula: 5Al_{2}O_{3}·H_{2}O
- IMA symbol: Akd

Identification
- Color: White, pale greenish yellow in thin section
- Fracture: Irregular/uneven
- Mohs scale hardness: 7–7.5
- Luster: Vitreous
- Streak: White
- Diaphaneity: Translucent
- Specific gravity: 3.68

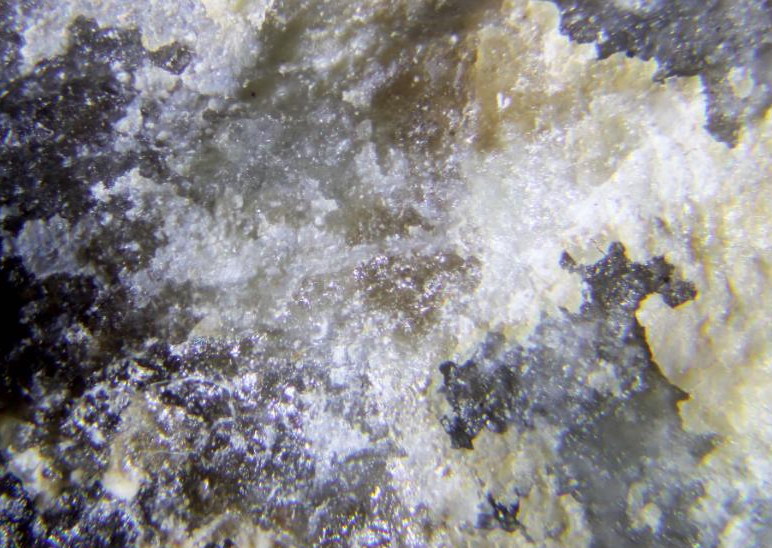
White vitreous crystal aggregates of the extremely rare Al mineral akdalaite from the TL (Solnechnoye Mine, Kara-Oba, Karazhal, Ulytau Region, Kazakhstan) and only one of 6 known localities worldwide. Ex Vandenbroucke Museum collection from Waregem, Belgium.

Akdalaite (IMA symbol: Akd) is a very rare mineral found in Kazakhstan and has the formula 5Al_{2}O_{3}·H_{2}O. It was formerly believed to be 4Al_{2}O_{3}·H_{2}O. It is therefore the same as tohdite an artificially produced phase. Studies on the crystal structure and spectra indicate that this is an aluminium oxide hydroxide.
