= Indium(III) hydroxide =

Names
- IUPAC name Indium(III) hydroxide
- Other names Indium hydroxide, indium trihydroxide

Identifiers
CAS Number	20661-21-6
3D model (JSmol)	Interactive image
ChemSpider	79974
ECHA InfoCard	100.039.937
EC Number	243-947-7
PubChem CID	88636
UNII	09J170CMXV
CompTox Dashboard (EPA)	DTXSID2074825
- InChI: InChI=1S/In.3H2O/h;3*1H2/q+3;;;/p-3 Key: IGUXCTSQIGAGSV-UHFFFAOYSA-K
- SMILES: [OH-].[OH-].[OH-].[In+3]

Properties
Chemical formula	In(OH)_{3}
Molar mass	165.8404 g/mol
Appearance	White solid
Density	4.38 g/cm^{3}
Melting point	150 °C (302 °F; 423 K) (decomposes)
Solubility in water	insoluble
Refractive index (n_{D})	1.725

Structure
Crystal structure	cubic
Space group	Im3
Coordination geometry	octahedral

Hazards
NFPA 704 (fire diamond)	2 0 1

Related compounds
Related compounds	Boric acid; Aluminium hydroxide; Gallium hydroxide; Thallium(III) hydroxide
- Except where otherwise noted, data are given for materials in their standard state (at 25 °C [77 °F], 100 kPa). Infobox references

Indium(III) hydroxide is the chemical compound with the formula In(OH)_{3}. Its prime use is as a precursor to indium(III) oxide, In_{2}O_{3}. It is sometimes found as the rare mineral dzhalindite.

== Structure ==
Indium(III) hydroxide has a cubic structure, space group Im3, a distorted ReO_{3} structure.

== Preparation and reactions ==
Neutralizing a solution containing an In^{3+} salt such as indium nitrate (In(NO_{3})_{3}) or a solution of indium trichloride (InCl_{3}) gives a white precipitate that on aging forms indium(III) hydroxide. A thermal decomposition of freshly prepared In(OH)_{3} shows the first step is the conversion of In(OH)_{3}·xH_{2}O to cubic indium(III) hydroxide. The precipitation of indium hydroxide was a step in the separation of indium from zincblende ore by Reich and Richter, the discoverers of indium.

Indium(III) hydroxide is amphoteric, like gallium(III) hydroxide (Ga(OH)_{3}) and aluminium hydroxide (Al(OH)_{3}), but is much less acidic than gallium hydroxide (Ga(OH)_{3}), having a lower solubility in alkaline solutions than in acid solutions. It is for all intents and purposes a basic hydroxide.

Dissolving indium(III) hydroxide in strong alkali gives solutions that probably contain either four coordinate [In(OH)_{4}]^{−} or [In(OH)_{4}(H_{2}O)]^{−}.

Reaction with acetic acid or carboxylic acids is likely to give the basic acetate or carboxylate salt, e.g. (CH_{3}COO)_{2}In(OH).

At 10 MPa pressure and 250-400 °C, indium(III) hydroxide converts to indium oxide hydroxide (InO(OH)), which has a distorted rutile structure.

Rapid decompression of samples of indium(III) hydroxide compressed at 34 GPa causes decomposition, yielding some indium metal.

Laser ablation of indium(III) hydroxide gives indium(I) hydroxide (InOH), a bent molecule with an In-O-H angle of around 132° and an In-O bond length of 201.7 pm.
