= Gallium(III) hydroxide =

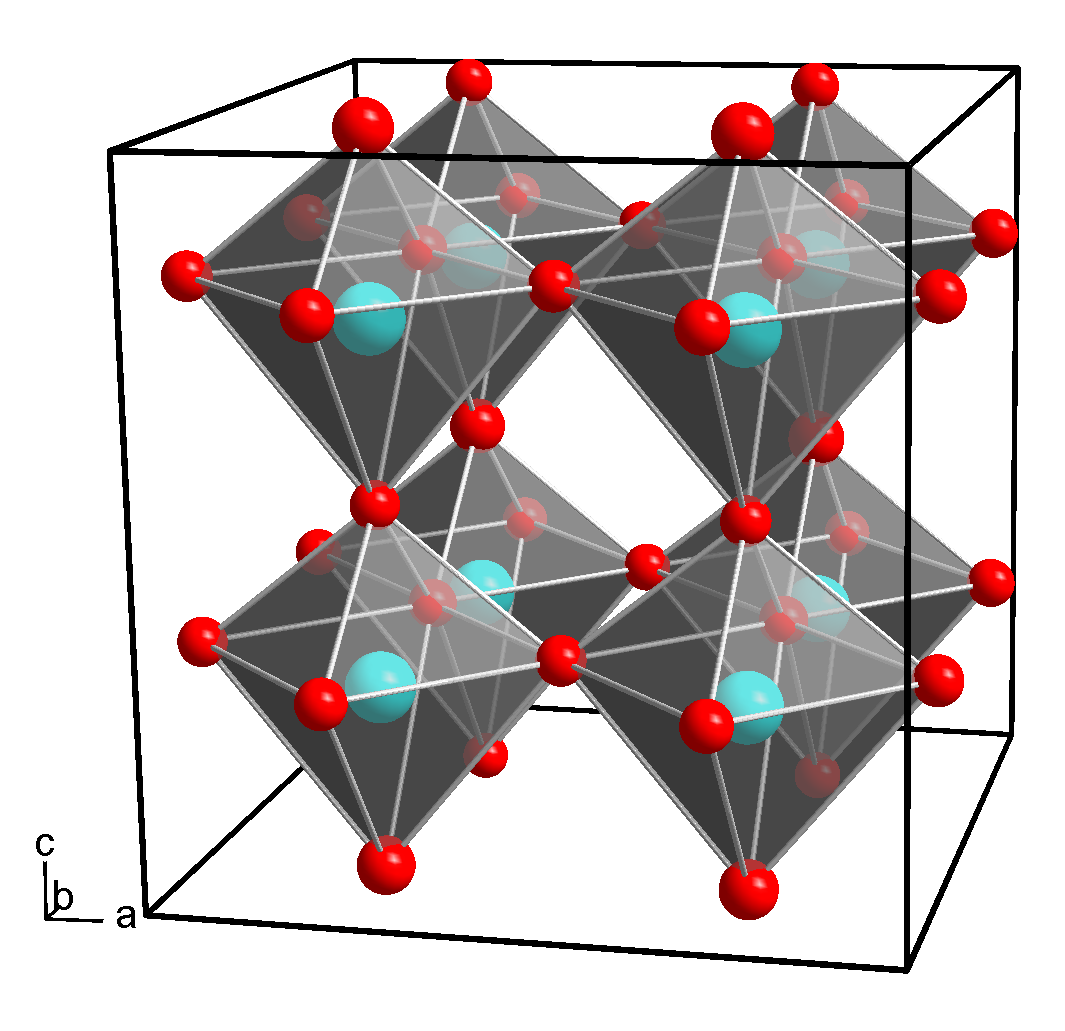
- Gallium(III) hydroxide

Names
- IUPAC name Gallium(III) hydroxide
- Systematic IUPAC name Trihydroxidogallium
- Other names Gallium trihydroxide Orthogallic acid Inorganic gallic acid

Identifiers
CAS Number	12023-99-3
3D model (JSmol)	Interactive image
ChemSpider	8329553
ECHA InfoCard	100.031.521
PubChem CID	10154045
UNII	S3PJW60NUM
CompTox Dashboard (EPA)	DTXSID90152744
- InChI: InChI=1S/Ga.3H2O/h;3*1H2/q+3;;;/p-3 Key: DNUARHPNFXVKEI-UHFFFAOYSA-K; InChI=1/Ga.3H2O/h;3*1H2/q+3;;;/p-3 Key: DNUARHPNFXVKEI-DFZHHIFOAG
- SMILES: [Ga+3].[OH-].[OH-].[OH-]

Properties
Chemical formula	Ga(OH)_{3}
Molar mass	123.768 g·mol^{−1}
Solubility product (K_{sp})	7.28×10^{−36}

Related compounds
Other cations	Boric acid; Aluminium hydroxide; Indium(III) hydroxide; Thallium(III) hydroxide
- Except where otherwise noted, data are given for materials in their standard state (at 25 °C [77 °F], 100 kPa). verify (what is ?) Infobox references

Gallium hydroxide is an inorganic compound with the chemical formula Ga(OH)_{3}. It is formed as a gel following the addition of ammonia to Ga^{3+} salts. It is also found in nature as the rare mineral söhngeite which is reported to contain octahedrally coordinated gallium atoms. Gallium hydroxide is amphoteric. In strongly acidic conditions, the gallium ion, Ga^{3+} is formed. In strongly basic conditions, [Ga(OH)_{4}]^{−} (tetrahydroxogallate(III)) is formed. Salts of [Ga(OH)_{4}]^{−} are sometimes called gallates.
