= Gallium oxide =

Gallium oxide may refer to

- Gallium(I) oxide, Ga_{2}O
- Gallium(III) oxide, Ga_{2}O_{3}
