= Gibbsite =

Form of aluminium hydroxide, mineral

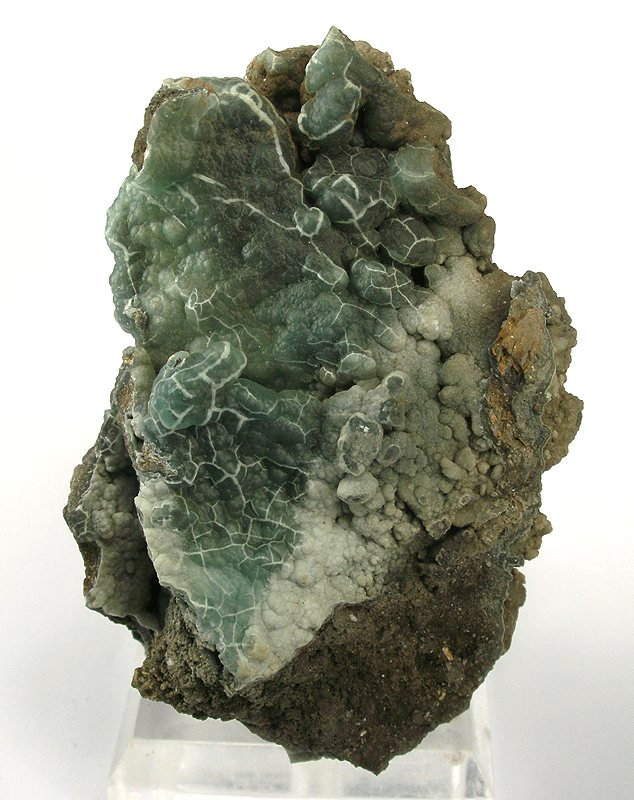
- Gibbsite

General
- Category: Hydroxide minerals
- Formula: Al(OH)_{3}
- IMA symbol: Gbb
- Strunz classification: 4.FE.10
- Crystal system: Monoclinic
- Crystal class: Prismatic (2/m) (same H-M symbol)
- Space group: P2_{1}/n

Identification
- Mohs scale hardness: 2.5–3
- Specific gravity: 2.35

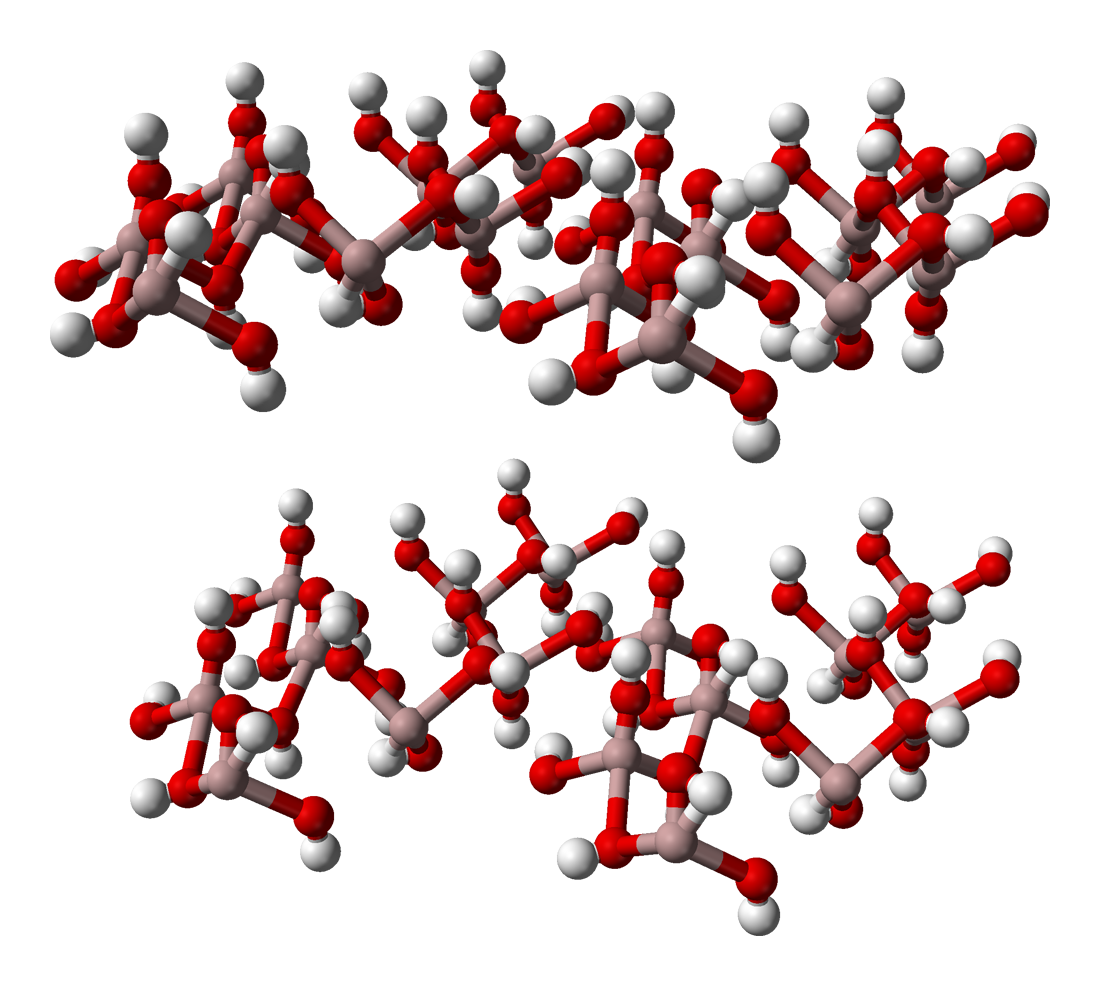
Ball-and-stick model of the part of the crystal structure of gibbsite

Gibbsite, Al(OH)_{3}, is one of the mineral forms of aluminium hydroxide. It is often designated as γ-Al(OH)_{3} (but sometimes as α-Al(OH)_{3}). It is also sometimes called hydrargillite (or hydrargyllite).

Gibbsite is an important ore of aluminium in that it is one of three main phases that make up the rock bauxite.

Gibbsite has three named structural polymorphs or polytypes: bayerite (designated often as α-Al(OH)_{3}, but sometimes as β-Al(OH)_{3}), doyleite, and nordstrandite. Gibbsite can be monoclinic or triclinic, while bayerite is monoclinic. Doyleite and nordstrandite are triclinic forms.

== Structure ==
The structure of gibbsite is interesting and analogous to the basic structure of the micas. The basic structure forms stacked sheets of linked octahedra. Each octahedron is composed of an aluminium ion bonded to six hydroxide groups, and each hydroxide group is shared by two aluminium octahedra. One third of the potential octahedral spaces are missing a central aluminium. The result is a neutral sheet: with aluminium as a +3 ion and hydroxide a −1 ion, the net cationic charge of one aluminium per six hydroxides is (+3)/6 = +1/2, and likewise the net anionic charge of one hydroxide per two aluminium atoms is (−1)/2 = −1/2. The lack of a charge on the gibbsite sheets means that there is no charge to retain ions between the sheets and act as a "glue" to keep the sheets together. The sheets are only held together by weak residual bonds and this results in a very soft easily cleaved mineral.

Gibbsite's structure is closely related to the structure of brucite, Mg(OH)_{2}. However the lower charge in brucite's magnesium (+2) as opposed to gibbsite's aluminium (+3) does not require that one third of the octahedrons be vacant of a central ion in order to maintain a neutral sheet. The different symmetry of gibbsite and brucite is due to the different way that the layers are stacked.

It is the gibbsite layer that in a way forms the "floor plan" for the mineral corundum, Al_{2}O_{3}. The basic structure of corundum is identical to gibbsite except the hydroxides are replaced by oxygen. Since oxygen has a charge of −2 the layers are not neutral and require that they must be bonded to other aluminiums above and below the initial layer producing the framework structure that is the structure of corundum.

Gibbsite is interesting for another reason because it is often found as a part of the structure of other minerals. The neutral aluminium hydroxide sheets are found sandwiched between silicate sheets in important clay groups: the illite, kaolinite, and montmorillonite/smectite groups. The individual aluminium hydroxide layers are identical to the individual layers of gibbsite and are referred to as the gibbsite layers.

The lattice parameters for gibbsite depending upon the particular method used to measure or calculate them and are therefore displayed as ranges below. An Al-Al interlayer spacing of 0.484 or 0.494 nm has been reported.

Gibbsite structural properties
| Crystal system | Molecules per unit cell | Lattice parameters (nm) | | | Lattice angles (°) | | |
| Crystal system | Molecules per unit cell | a | b | c | | | |
|---|---|---|---|---|---|---|---|
| Monoclinic | 4 | 0.850–0.868 | 0.487–0.508 | 0.922–0.974 | | 92.8–94.5 | |
| Triclinic | 16 | 1.733 | 1.008 | 0.973 | 94.2 | 92.1 | 90.0 |

== Mineralogical properties ==
Index of Refraction
| α | β | γ |
|---|---|---|
| 1.568 | 1.568 | 1.587 |

== Etymology ==
Gibbsite is named after George Gibbs (1776–1833), an American mineral collector.
