= Doyleite =

Hydroxide mineral

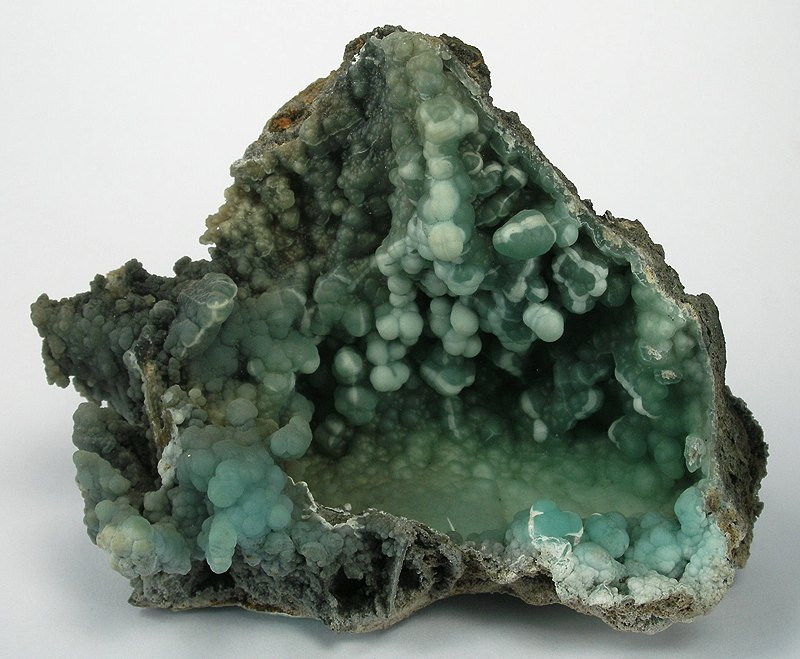

General
- Category: Hydroxide Minerals
- Formula: Al(OH)_{3}
- IMA symbol: Doy
- Strunz classification: 4.FE.10
- Dana classification: 6.3.4.1
- Crystal system: Triclinic
- Space group: P1̅ or P1
- Unit cell: 104.37

Identification
- Formula mass: 78
- Color: White, creamy-white, bluish-white
- Cleavage: Perfect on {010} Distinct on {100}
- Mohs scale hardness: 2.5 - 3
- Luster: Vitreous
- Streak: White
- Optical properties: Biaxial (+)
- Refractive index: n_{α} = 1.545 n_{β} = 1.553 n_{γ} = 1.566
- Birefringence: 0.021
- 2V angle: Measured: 77° Calculated: 78°
- Dispersion: None

Doyleite is a rare aluminum trihydroxide mineral named in honor of its discoverer, the Canadian physician Earl Joseph (Jess) Doyle. It was first definitively described in 1985 (although a partial description was published in 1979) and it is approved by the IMA. It was described from Mont Saint-Hilaire, where it is extremely rare.

== Properties ==
Doyleite grows in small square tabular crystals, which form rosettes. Individual crystals can grow up to 8 mm. The mineral has a layered micaceous structure. This pinacoidal mineral mostly consists of oxygen (61.53%) and aluminum (34.59%), but also contains hydrogen (3.88%). Doyleite does not display any radioactive properties. At room temperature, doyleite is not soluble in a 1:1 ratio of sulfuric acid, hydrogen chloride, and nitric acid. Crystals are tabular on (010), which show forms of {010}, {101}, and {101̅}. Occasionally, however, it shows forms of {001} and {100}. Some specimens are coated with a thin film of dark brown amorphous material, thought to be iron oxide. The mineral has been determined to be triclinic by a three-dimensional single-crystal diffraction study. It has a bilayer structure, similar to its polymorphs. There is good correspondence between the AFM images of doyleite's (010) surface and the calculated structure. The hydroxyl group's intra-layer interactions show no Raman scattering in contrast to its polymorphs. The P1 j structure model is slightly more unstable than the non-centrosymmetrical P1 structure model. The layered structures are similar to those found in one of its polymorphs, bayerite. The difference is within the interlayer shift vectors only. Doyleite is the least stable of the polymorphs.

== Mining and environment ==
Doyleite is associated with fluorite, zircon, pyrite, albite, siderite and molybdenite. It is the polymorph of gibbsite, nordstrandite, bayerite and UM1990-28-OHF:Al. Doyleite has two type localities, one is the Poudrette and Francon quarry, Canada; the other is Mont Saint-Hilaire, also in Canada. It is a late-stage hydrothermal mineral, and can form hydrothermal mineral deposits. Doyleite is found lining vugs in veins in nepheline syenite. It also occurs with calcite and pyrite in albitite veins.
