= Thallium(III) hydroxide =

Names
- IUPAC name Thallium(III) hydroxide
- Other names Thallium trihydroxide

Identifiers
3D model (JSmol)	Interactive image
ChemSpider	15055199
PubChem CID	20466441
- InChI: InChI=1S/3H2O.Tl/h3*1H2;/q;;;+3/p-3 Key: GEPJDKDOADVEKE-UHFFFAOYSA-K
- SMILES: O[Tl](O)O

Properties
Chemical formula	Tl(OH)_{3}
Molar mass	255.4053 g/mol
Appearance	Reddish-brown solid
- Except where otherwise noted, data are given for materials in their standard state (at 25 °C [77 °F], 100 kPa). verify (what is ?) Infobox references

Thallium(III) hydroxide, Tl(OH)_{3}, also known as thallic hydroxide, is a hydroxide of thallium. It is a reddish-brown solid.

Thallium(III) hydroxide is a very weak base; it dissociates to give the thallium(III) ion, Tl^{3+}, only in strongly acidic conditions.

== Preparation ==
Thallium(III) hydroxide can be produced by the reaction of thallium(III) chloride with sodium hydroxide or the electrochemical oxidation of Tl^{+} in alkaline conditions.
