= Metal hydroxide =

Family of chemical compounds

In chemistry, metal hydroxides are a family of compounds of the form M^{n+}(OH)_{n}, where M is a metal. They consist of hydroxide (OH^{−}) anions and metallic cations, and are often strong bases. Some metal hydroxides, such as alkali metal hydroxides, ionize completely when dissolved. Certain metal hydroxides are weak electrolytes and dissolve only partially in aqueous solution. Example - KOH,NaOH,etc.

== Examples ==
- Aluminium hydroxide
- Beryllium hydroxide
- Cobalt(II) hydroxide
- Copper(II) hydroxide
- Curium hydroxide
- Gold(III) hydroxide
- Iron(II) hydroxide
- Mercury(II) hydroxide
- Nickel(II) hydroxide
- Tin(II) hydroxide
- Uranyl hydroxide
- Zinc hydroxide
- Zirconium(IV) hydroxide
- Lithium hydroxide
- Rubidium hydroxide
- Cesium hydroxide
- Sodium hydroxide
- Potassium hydroxide

=== Other metal hydroxides ===
- Gallium(III) hydroxide
- Lead(II) hydroxide
- Thallium(I) hydroxide
- Thallium(III) hydroxide

== Molecular metal hydroxides ==
Many metal hydroxides are in fact complexes, i.e. molecules or ions. The transition metal hydroxide complexes are a well developed area in coordination chemistry.

== Role in soils ==
In soils, it is assumed that larger amounts of natural phenols are released from decomposing plant litter rather than from throughfall in any natural plant community. Decomposition of dead plant material causes complex organic compounds to be slowly oxidized (lignin-like humus) or to break down into simpler forms (sugars and amino sugars, aliphatic and phenolic organic acids), which are further transformed into microbial biomass (microbial humus) or are reorganized, and further oxidized, into humic assemblages (fulvic and humic acids), which bind to clay minerals and metal hydroxides.
