= Vanadium sulfate =

Vanadium sulfate may refer to:

- Vanadium(II) sulfate, VSO_{4}
- Vanadium(III) sulfate, V_{2}(SO_{4})_{3}
- Vanadyl sulfate, vanadyl(IV) sulfate, VOSO_{4}
