= C5H6O3 =

The molecular formula C_{5}H_{6}O_{3} (molar mass: 114.10 g/mol, exact mass: 114.0317 u) may refer to:

- 2-Oxopent-4-enoic acid (2-oxopent-4-enoate)
- 2,3,4-Pentanetrione, the simplest linear triketone
