= Vanadium(II) sulfate =

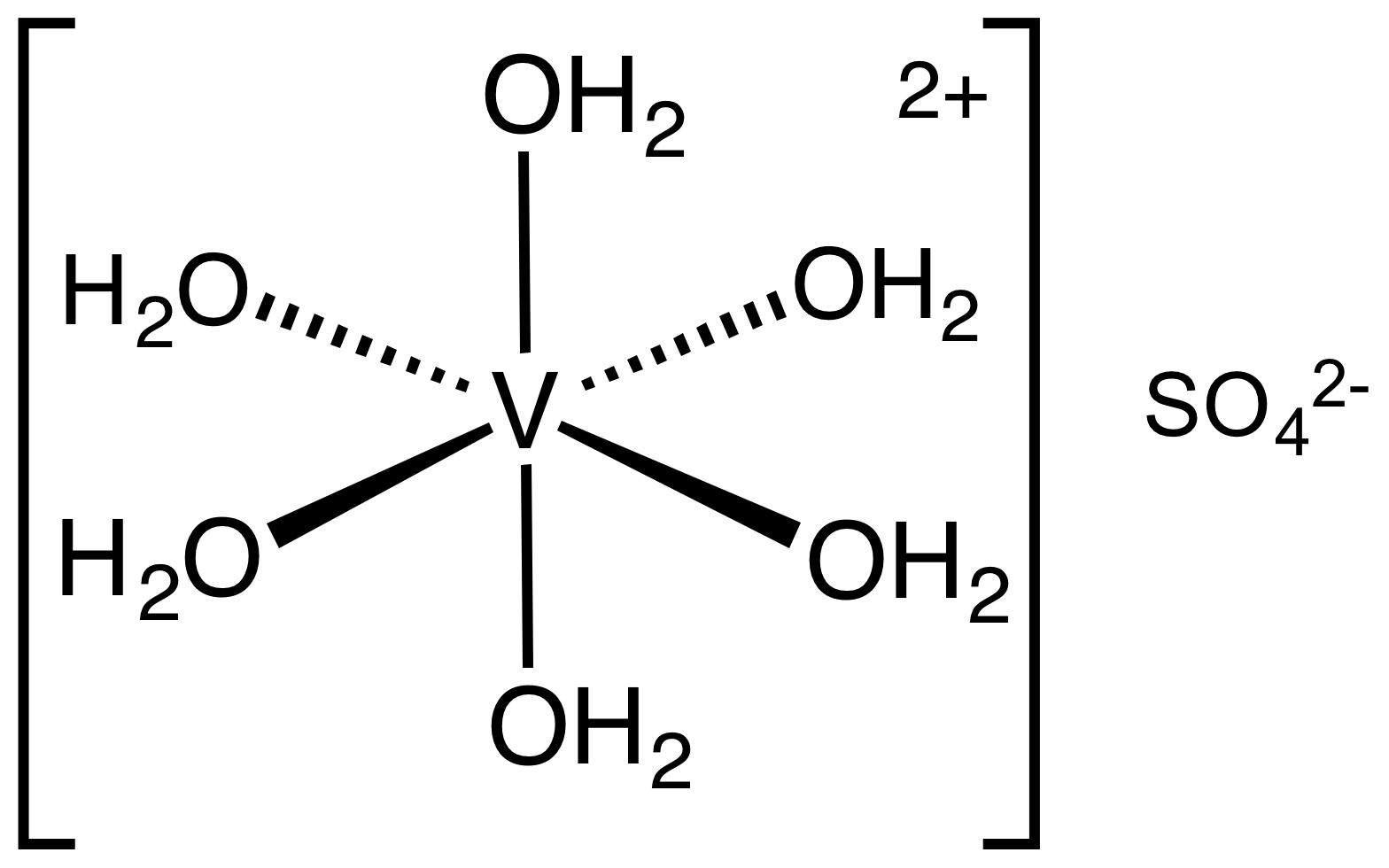

Identifiers
CAS Number	anhydrous: 13566-06-8; hexahydrate: 12439-96-2
3D model (JSmol)	anhydrous: Interactive image; hexahydrate: Interactive image; heptahydrate: Interactive image
ChemSpider	anhydrous: 145979; hexahydrate: 77429427
ECHA InfoCard	100.233.281
EC Number	anhydrous: 806-241-5
PubChem CID	anhydrous: 166848; heptahydrate: 22613976
UNII	anhydrous: IO5B4EXJYI
CompTox Dashboard (EPA)	anhydrous: DTXSID60929102
- InChI: anhydrous: InChI=1S/H2O4S.V/c1-5(2,3)4;/h(H2,1,2,3,4);/q;+2/p-2 Key: VLOPEOIIELCUML-UHFFFAOYSA-L; hexahydrate: InChI=1S/H2O4S.6H2O.V/c1-5(2,3)4;;;;;;;/h(H2,1,2,3,4);6*1H2;/q;;;;;;;+2/p-2 Key: LRLWNWIKXRXQMV-UHFFFAOYSA-L
- SMILES: anhydrous: [V+2].[O-]S([O-])(=O)=O; hexahydrate: O.O.O.O.O.O.O=S(=O)([O-])[O-].[V+2]; heptahydrate: O.O.O.O.O.O.O.O=S(=O)([O-])[O-].[V+2]

Properties
Chemical formula	H_{12}O_{10}SV
Molar mass	255.09 g·mol^{−1}
Appearance	violet solid
Density	1.910 g/cm^{3}

Hazards
- GHS labelling
Pictograms	(GHS07: Exclamation mark)
Signal word	Warning
Hazard statements	H302
Precautionary statements	P264, P270, P301+P317, P330, P501
- Except where otherwise noted, data are given for materials in their standard state (at 25 °C [77 °F], 100 kPa). Infobox references

Vanadium(II) sulfate describes a family of inorganic compounds with the formula VSO_{4}(H_{2}O)_{x} where 0 ≤ x ≤ 7. The hexahydrate is most commonly encountered. It is a violet solid that dissolves in water to give air-sensitive solutions of the aquo complex. The salt is isomorphous with [Mg(H_{2}O)_{6}]SO_{4}. Compared to the V–O bond length of 191 pm in [V(H_{2}O)_{6}]^{3+}, the V–O distance is 212 pm in the [V(H_{2}O)_{6}]SO_{4}. This nearly 10% elongation reflects the effect of the lower charge, hence weakened electrostatic attraction.

The heptahydrate has also been crystallized. The compound is prepared by electrolytic reduction of vanadyl sulfate in sulfuric acid. The crystals feature [V(H_{2}O)_{6}]^{2+} centers but with an extra water of crystallization. The salt is isomorphous with ferrous sulfate heptahydrate. A related salt is vanadous ammonium sulfate, (NH_{4})_{2}V(SO_{4})_{2}·6H_{2}O, a Tutton's salt isomorphous with ferrous ammonium sulfate.
