= Solvation shell =

Solvent interface of a solute

The first solvation shell of a sodium ion dissolved in water

A solvation shell or solvation sheath is the solvent interface of any chemical compound or biomolecule that constitutes the solute in a solution. When the solvent is water it is called a hydration shell or hydration sphere. The number of solvent molecules surrounding each unit of solute is called the hydration number of the solute.

A classic example is when water molecules arrange around a metal ion. If the metal ion is a cation, the electronegative oxygen atom of the water molecule would be attracted electrostatically to the positive charge on the metal ion. The result is a solvation shell of water molecules that surround the ion. This shell can be several molecules thick, dependent upon the charge of the ion, its distribution and spatial dimensions.

A number of molecules of solvent are involved in the solvation shell around anions and cations from a dissolved salt in a solvent. Metal ions in aqueous solutions form metal aquo complexes. This number can be determined by various methods like compressibility and NMR measurements among others.

== Relation to activity coefficient of an electrolyte and its solvation shell number ==
The solvation shell number of a dissolved electrolyte can be linked to the statistical component of the activity coefficient of the electrolyte and to the ratio between the apparent molar volume of a dissolved electrolyte in a concentrated solution and the molar volume of the solvent (water):

$\ln \gamma_s = \frac{h- \nu}{\nu} \ln \left(1 + \frac{br}{55.5} \right) - \frac{h}{\nu} \ln \left(1 - \frac{br}{55.5} \right) + \frac{br(r + h -\nu)}{55.5 \left(1 + \frac{br}{55.5} \right)}$

== Hydration shells of proteins ==
The hydration shell (also sometimes called hydration layer) that forms around proteins is of particular importance in biochemistry. This interaction of the protein surface with the surrounding water is often referred to as protein hydration and is fundamental to the activity of the protein. The hydration layer around a protein has been found to have dynamics distinct from the bulk water to a distance of 1 nm. The duration of contact of a specific water molecule with the protein surface may be in the subnanosecond range while molecular dynamics simulations suggest the time water spends in the hydration shell before mixing with the outside bulk water could be in the femtosecond to picosecond range, and that near features conventionally regarded as attractive to water, such as hydrogen bond donors, the water molecules are actually relatively weakly bound and are easily displaced. Solvation shell water molecules can also influence the molecular design of protein binders or inhibitors.

With other solvents and solutes, varying steric and kinetic factors can also affect the solvation shell.

== See also ==
- Activity coefficient
- Metal ions in aqueous solution
- Ion transport number
- Ionic radius
- Water model
- Poisson–Boltzmann equation
- Hydration energy
- Solvation
