= Lead(II) hydroxide =

Names
- IUPAC name Lead(II) hydroxide
- Other names: Lead hydroxide; Plumbous hydroxide

Identifiers
| CAS Number | 19783-14-3 |
| 3D model (JSmol) | Interactive image |
| ChemSpider | 8035300 |
| ECHA InfoCard | 100.039.358 |
| EC Number | 243-310-3 |
| PubChem CID | 9859601 |
| CompTox Dashboard (EPA) | DTXSID601015737 DTXSID10431967, DTXSID601015737 |
- InChI: InChI=1S/2H2O.Pb/h2*1H2;/q;;+2/p-2 Key: VNZYIVBHUDKWEO-UHFFFAOYSA-L; InChI=1/2H2O.Pb/h2*1H2;/q;;+2/p-2 Key: VNZYIVBHUDKWEO-NUQVWONBAE
- SMILES: [OH-].[OH-].[Pb+2]

Properties
| Chemical formula | Pb(OH)_{2} |
| Molar mass | 241.2 g·mol^{−1} |
| Solubility in water | 0.0155 g/(100 mL) (20 °C) |
| Solubility product (K_{sp}) | 10^{−19.85} to 10^{−14.9} |

Hazards
- GHS labelling
| Pictograms | (GHS06: Toxic) (GHS07: Exclamation mark) (GHS09: Environmental hazard) |
| Signal word | Danger |
| Hazard statements | H302, H332, H351, H360, H373, H410 |
| NFPA 704 (fire diamond) | 2 0 0 |

Related compounds
| Other cations | Germanium(II) hydroxide; Tin(II) hydroxide; Mercury(II) hydroxide |
- Except where otherwise noted, data are given for materials in their standard state (at 25 °C [77 °F], 100 kPa). verify (what is ?) Infobox references

Lead(II) hydroxide is an inorganic compound with the formula Pb(OH)_{2}. The material has not been isolated but its existence has been inferred as an ill-defined component of solutions of Pb(II). "Lead does not appear to form a simple hydroxide, Pb(OH)_{2}," however. Instead it forms oxides and oxy-hydroxides.

== Preparation ==
Addition of hydroxide to a solution of a lead(II) salt, a hydrated lead oxide PbO·xH_{2}O (with x < 1) is obtained. Careful hydrolysis of lead(II) acetate solution yields a crystalline product with a formula 6PbO·2H_{2}O or Pb_{6}O_{4}(OH)_{4}. This material is a cluster compound, consisting of an octahedron of Pb centers, each face of which is capped by an oxide or a hydroxide. The structure is reminiscent of the Mo_{6}S_{8} subunit of the Chevrel phases.

== Reactions ==
In aqueous solution, lead(II) hydroxide is a somewhat weak base, forming lead(II) ion, Pb^{2+}, under weakly acidic conditions. This cation hydrolyzes and, under progressively increasing alkaline conditions, it becomes somewhat weak acid, and it forms Pb(OH)^{+}, Pb(OH)_{2}(aqueous), Pb(OH)^{−}_{3}, and other species, including several polynuclear species, e.g., Pb_{4}(OH)^{4+}_{4}, Pb_{3}(OH)^{2+}_{4}, Pb_{6}O(OH)^{4+}_{6}. Upon heating to decomposition temperatures, it forms lead oxide (PbO) in the yellow form, litharge.

== History ==
The name lead hydrate has sometimes been used in the past but it is unclear whether this refers to Pb(OH)_{2} or PbO·xH_{2}O. In 1964 it was believed that such a simple compound did not exist, as lead basic carbonate (2PbCO_{3}·Pb(OH)_{2}) or lead(II) oxide (PbO) was encountered where lead hydroxide was expected. This has been a subject of considerable confusion in the past. However, subsequent research has demonstrated that lead(II) hydroxide does indeed exist as one of a series of lead hydroxides.
