= Vanadyl acetylacetonate =

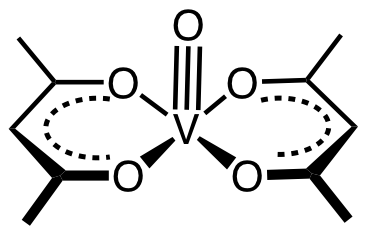

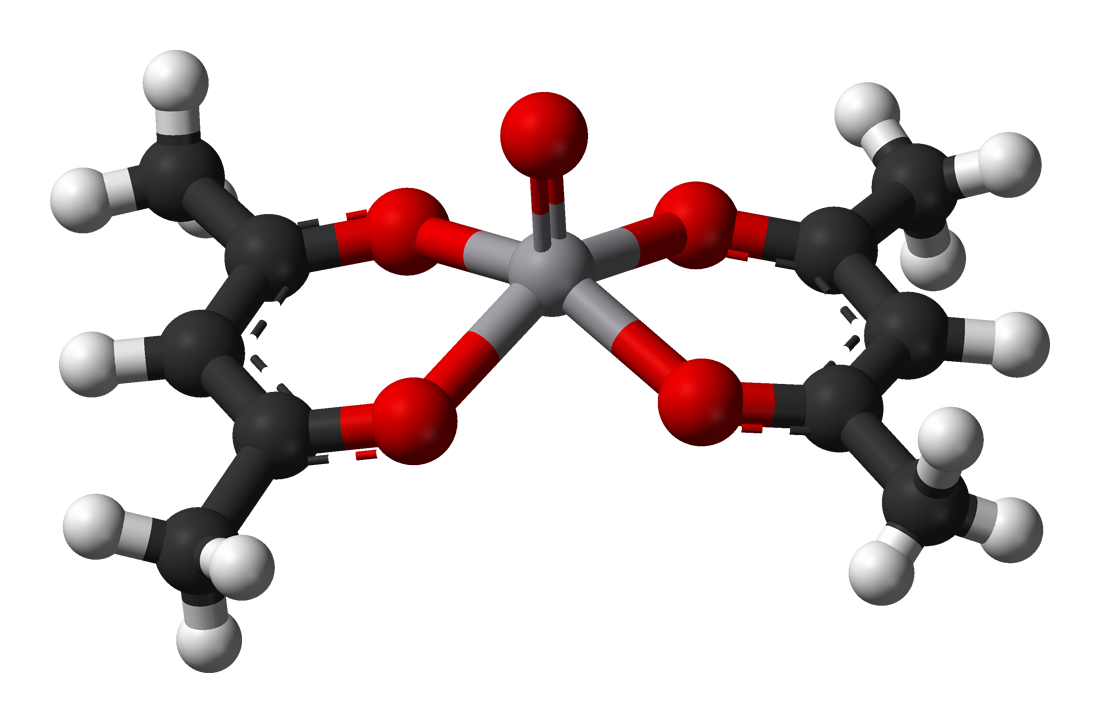

Names
- IUPAC name Oxobis(acetylacetonato)vanadium(IV)
- Systematic IUPAC name Oxobis[(Z)-4-oxopent-2-en-2-olato-κ^{2}O,O′]vanadium(IV)
- Other names VO(acac)_{2}, VO(pd)_{2}

Identifiers
CAS Number	3153-26-2
3D model (JSmol)	Interactive image
ChemSpider	17344686
ECHA InfoCard	100.019.628
EC Number	221-590-8
PubChem CID	16217092
CompTox Dashboard (EPA)	DTXSID70904369
- InChI: InChI=1S/2C5H8O2.O.V/c2*1-4(6)3-5(2)7;;/h2*3,6H,1-2H3;;/b2*4-3+;; Key: FSJSYDFBTIVUFD-XHTSQIMGSA-N
- SMILES: CC(=[O+]1)C=C(C)O[V-3]12(#[O+])OC(C)=CC(C)=[O+]2

Properties
Chemical formula	C_{10}H_{14}O_{5}V
Molar mass	265.157 g/mol
Appearance	blue-green
Density	1.50 g/cm^{3}
Melting point	258 °C (496 °F; 531 K)
Boiling point	174 °C (345 °F; 447 K) at 0.2 torrs (27 Pa)
Solubility	CHCl_{3}, CH_{2}Cl_{2}, Benzene, CH_{3}OH, CH_{3}CH_{2}OH
- Except where otherwise noted, data are given for materials in their standard state (at 25 °C [77 °F], 100 kPa). verify (what is ?) Infobox references

Vanadyl acetylacetonate is the chemical compound with the formula VO(acac)_{2}, where acac^{–} is the conjugate base of acetylacetone. It is a blue-green solid that dissolves in polar organic solvents. The coordination complex consists of the vanadyl group, VO^{2+}, bound to two acac^{–} ligands via the two oxygen atoms on each. Like other charge-neutral acetylacetonate complexes, it is not soluble in water.

== Synthesis ==
The complex is generally prepared from vanadium(IV), e.g. vanadyl sulfate:

VOSO_{4} + 2 Hacac + Na_{2}CO_{3} → VO(acac)_{2} + Na_{2}SO_{4} + H_{2}O + CO_{2}

It can also be prepared by a redox reaction starting with vanadium pentoxide. In this reaction, some acetylacetone is oxidized to 2,3,4-Pentanetrione.

== Structure and properties ==
The complex has a square pyramidal structure with a short V=O bond. This d^{1} compound is paramagnetic. Its optical spectrum exhibits two transitions. It is a weak Lewis acid, forming adducts with pyridine and methylamine.

== Applications ==
It is used in organic chemistry as a catalyst for the epoxidation of allylic alcohols by tert-butyl hydroperoxide (TBHP). The VO(acac)_{2}–TBHP system exclusively epoxidizes geraniol at the allylic alcohol position, leaving the other alkene of geraniol untouched. By comparison, m-CPBA, another epoxidizing agent, reacts with both alkenes, creating the products in a two to one ratio favoring reaction at the alkene away from the hydroxyl group. TBHP oxidizes VO(acac)_{2} to a vanadium(V) species which coordinates the alcohol of the substrate and the hydroperoxide, directing the epoxidation to occur at the alkene close to this coordination site.

== Biomedical aspects ==
Vanadyl acetylacetonate exhibits insulin mimetic properties, in that it can stimulate the phosphorylation of protein kinase B (PKB/Akt) and glycogen synthase kinase 3 (GSK-3). It has also been shown inhibit tyrosine phosphatase (PTPase), PTPases such as PTP1B, which dephosphorylates insulin receptor beta subunit, thus increasing its phosphorylation, allowing for a prolonged activation of IRS-1, PKB, and GSK-3, allowing them to exert their anti-diabetic properties.
