= Rubidium germanium iodide =

Identifiers
| 3D model (JSmol) | Interactive image |
- InChI: InChI=1S/Ge.3HI.Rb/h;3*1H;/q+2;;;;+1/p-3 Key: BMENQWFJSMYCLV-UHFFFAOYSA-K
- SMILES: [Ge+2].[I-].[I-].[I-].[Rb+]

Properties
| Chemical formula | GeI_{3}Rb |
| Molar mass | 538.811 g·mol^{−1} |
| Melting point | 61 °C (decomposes) |
- Except where otherwise noted, data are given for materials in their standard state (at 25 °C [77 °F], 100 kPa). Infobox references

Rubidium germanium iodide is a ternary halide of rubidium and germanium, with the chemical formula RbGeI_{3}. It is being considered as a potential counterpart to the toxic CH_{3}NH_{3}PbI_{3} for photovoltaic applications.

== Properties ==
Rubidium germanium iodide is polymorphic with various distorted perovskite-like structures, reflecting the influence of the "non-bonding" pair of electrons on the centre of Ge^{2+}.

At room temperature, rubidium germanium iodide has a black, cubic perovskite form; between -29 °C and -52 °C a black rhombohedral form; a bordeaux-red orthrhombic perovskite form between -52 °C and -92 °C; and a lemon-yellow orthorhombic form below -92 °C.

== Preparation ==
Rubidium germanium iodide can be prepared by reacting germanium(II) hydroxide and rubidium iodide in hydroiodic acid:

Ge(OH)_{2} + RbI + 2 HI → GeRbI_{3} + 2 H_{2}O
