= Metal aquo complex =

Chemical compound composed of a metal ion bound to water ligands

In chemistry, metal aquo complexes are coordination compounds containing metal ions with only water as a ligand. These complexes are the predominant species in aqueous solutions of many metal salts, such as metal nitrates, sulfates, and perchlorates. They have the general stoichiometry [M(H_{2}O)_{n}]^{z+}. Their behavior underpins many aspects of environmental, biological, and industrial chemistry. This article focuses on complexes where water is the only ligand ("homoleptic aquo complexes"), but of course many complexes are known to consist of a mix of aquo and other ligands.

== Stoichiometry and structure ==
=== Hexa-aquo complexes ===
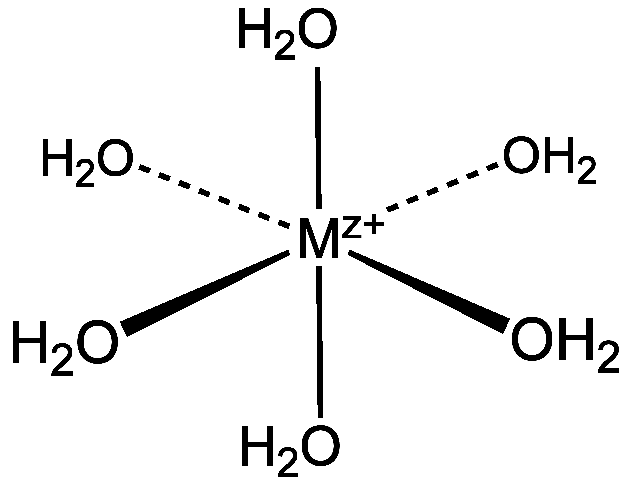
Structure of an octahedral metal aquo complex.

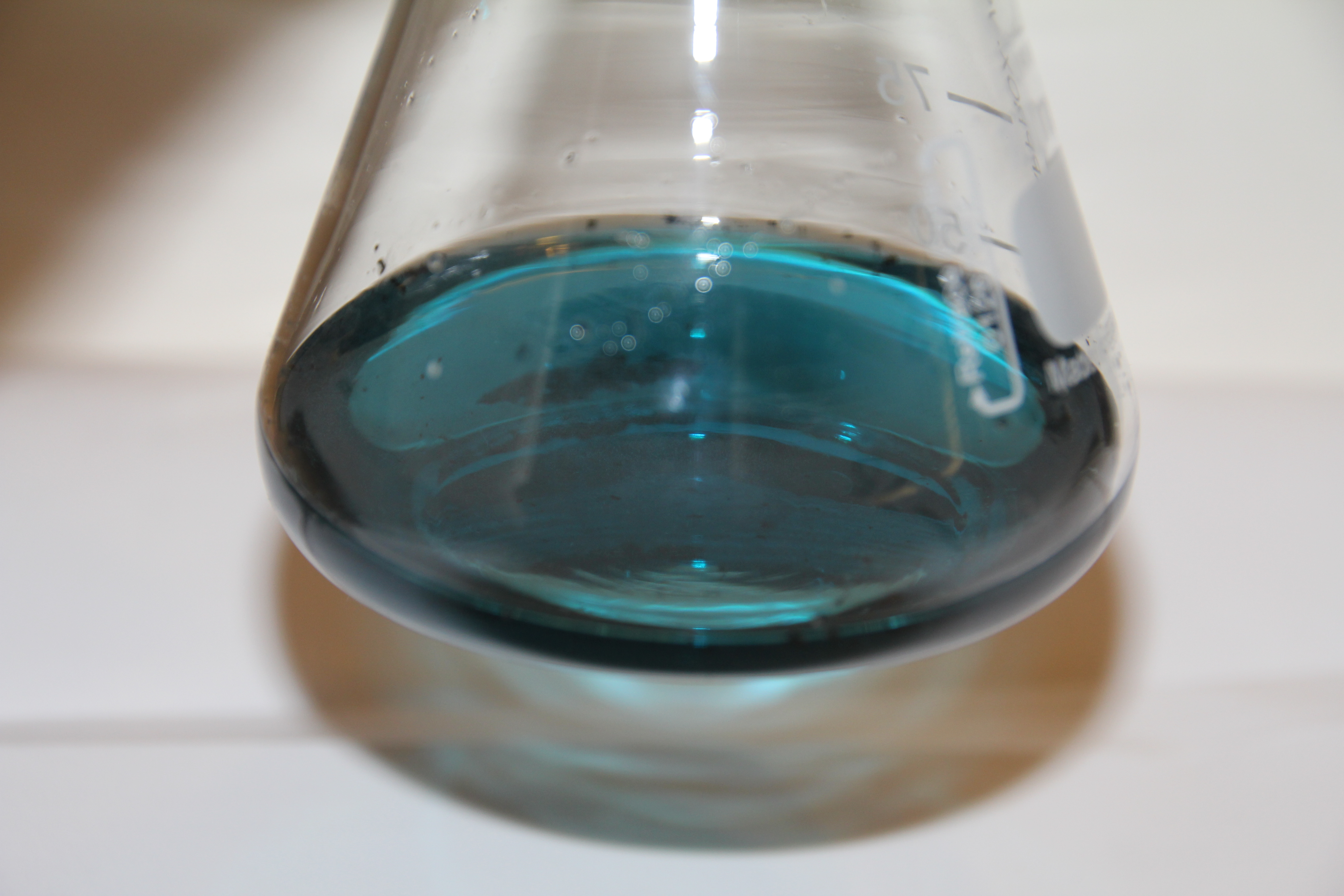
Chromium(II) ion in aqueous solution.

Most aquo complexes are mono-nuclear, with the general formula [M(H_{2}O)_{6}]^{n+}, with n = 2 or 3; they have an octahedral structure. The water molecules function as Lewis bases, donating a pair of electrons to the metal ion and forming a dative covalent bond with it. Typical examples are listed in the following table.

Complex	colour	electron config.	M−O distance (Å)	water exchange rate (s^{−1}, 25 °C)	M^{2+/3+} self-exchange rate (M^{−1}s^{−1}, 25 °C)
[Ti(H_{2}O)_{6}]^{3+}	violet	(t_{2g})^{1}	2.025	1.8×10^{5}	—N/a
[V(H_{2}O)_{6}]^{2+}	violet	(t_{2g})^{3}	2.12	8.7×10^{1}	fast
[V(H_{2}O)_{6}]^{3+}	purple	(t_{2g})^{2}	1.991	5.0×10^{2}	fast
[Cr(H_{2}O)_{6}]^{2+}	blue	(t_{2g})^{3}(e_{g})^{1}	2.06 and 2.33	1.2×10^{8}	slow
[Cr(H_{2}O)_{6}]^{3+}	violet	(t_{2g})^{3}	1.961	2.4×10^{−6}	slow
[Mn(H_{2}O)_{6}]^{2+}	pale pink	(t_{2g})^{3}(e_{g})^{2}	2.177	2.1×10^{7}	—N/a
[Fe(H_{2}O)_{6}]^{2+}	pale blue-green	(t_{2g})^{4}(e_{g})^{2}	2.095	4.4×10^{6}	fast
[Fe(H_{2}O)_{6}]^{3+}	pale violet	(t_{2g})^{3}(e_{g})^{2}	1.990	1.6×10^{2}	fast
[Co(H_{2}O)_{6}]^{2+}	pink	(t_{2g})^{5}(e_{g})^{2}	2.08	3.2×10^{6}	—N/a
[Ni(H_{2}O)_{6}]^{2+}	green	(t_{2g})^{6}(e_{g})^{2}	2.05	3.2×10^{4}	—N/a
[Cu(H_{2}O)_{6}]^{2+}	blue	(t_{2g})^{6}(e_{g})^{3}	1.97 and 2.30	5.7×10^{9}	—N/a
[Zn(H_{2}O)_{6}]^{2+}	colorless	(t_{2g})^{6}(e_{g})^{4}	2.03-2.10	fast	—N/a

Tutton's salts are crystalline compounds with the generic formula (NH_{4})_{2}M(SO_{4})_{2}·(H_{2}O)_{6} (where M = V^{2+}, Cr^{2+}, Mn^{2+}, Co^{2+}, Ni^{2+}, or Cu^{2+}). Alums, MM′(SO_{4})_{2}(H_{2}O)_{12}, are also double salts. Both sets of salts contain hexa-aquo metal cations.

=== Tetra-aquo complexes ===
Silver(I) forms [Ag(H_{2}O)_{4}]^{+}, a rare example of a tetrahedral aquo complex. Palladium(II) and platinum(II) form square planar aquo complexes.

=== Octa- and nona- aquo complexes ===
Aquo complexes of lanthanide(III) ions are eight- and nine-coordinate, reflecting the large size of the metal centres.

=== Binuclear-aquo complexes ===
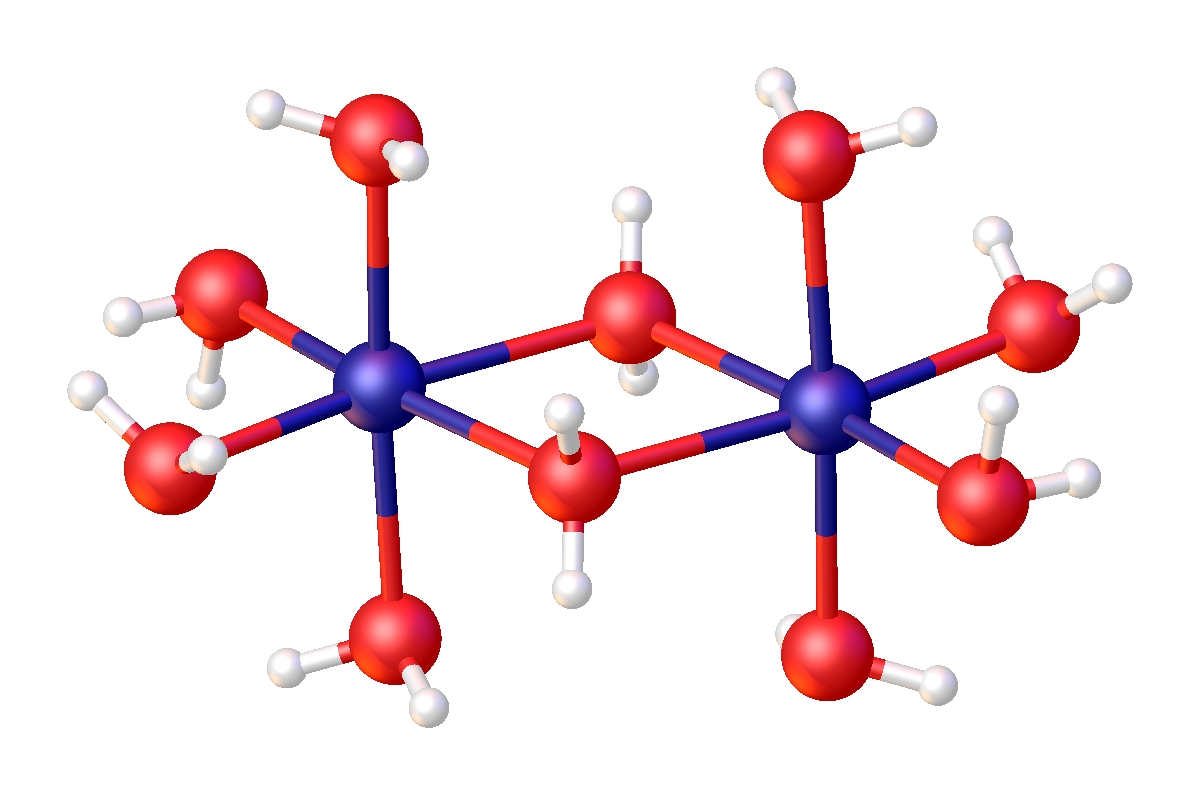
Structure of [Co_{2}(OH_{2})_{10}]^{4+} color code: red = O, white = H, blue = Co.

In the binuclear ion [Co_{2}(OH_{2})_{10}]^{4+} each bridging water molecule donates one pair of electrons to one cobalt ion and another pair to the other cobalt ion. The Co-O (bridging) bond lengths are 213 picometers, and the Co-O (terminal) bond lengths are 10 pm shorter.

The complexes [Mo_{2}(H_{2}O)_{8}]^{4+} and [Rh_{2}(H_{2}O)_{10}]^{4+} contain metal-metal bonds.

=== Hydroxo- and oxo- complexes of aquo ions ===
Monomeric aquo complexes of Nb, Ta, Mo, W, Mn, Tc, Re, and Os in oxidation states +4 to +7 have not been reported. For example, [Ti(H_{2}O)_{6}]^{4+} is unknown: the hydrolyzed species [Ti(OH)_{2}(H_{2}O)_{n}]^{2+} is the principal species in dilute solutions. With the higher oxidation states the effective electrical charge on the cation is further reduced by the formation of oxo-complexes.

=== Aquo complexes of the lanthanide cations ===
Lanthanide salts form aquo complexes. The homoleptic tricationic aquo complexes have nine water ligands.

== Reactions ==
Some reactions considered fundamental to the behavior of metal aquo ions are ligand exchange, electron-transfer, and acid–base reactions.

=== Water exchange ===
Ligand exchange involves replacement of a water ligand ("coordinated water") with water in solution ("bulk water"). Often the process is represented using labeled water $\ce{H2O^\star}$:

$$\ce{[M(H2O)_\mathit{n}]^\mathit{z}+} + \ce{H2O^\star } \longrightarrow \ce{[M(H2O)_\mathit{n-1}(H2O^\star )]^\mathit{z}+} + \ce{H2O}$$

In the absence of isotopic labeling, the reaction is degenerate, meaning that the free energy change is zero. Rates vary over many orders of magnitude. The main factor affecting rates is charge: highly charged metal aquo cations exchange their water more slowly than singly charged cations. Thus, the exchange rates for [Na(H_{2}O)_{6}]^{+} and [Al(H_{2}O)_{6}]^{3+} differ by a factor of 10^{9}. Electron configuration is also a major factor, illustrated by the fact that the rates of water exchange for [Al(H_{2}O)_{6}]^{3+} and [Ir(H_{2}O)_{6}]^{3+} differ by a factor of 10^{9} also. Water exchange usually follows a dissociative substitution pathway, so the rate constants indicate first order reactions.

=== Electron exchange ===
This reaction usually applies to the interconversion of di- and trivalent metal ions, which involves the exchange of only one electron. The process is called self-exchange, meaning that the ion appears to exchange electrons with itself. The standard electrode potential for the following equilibrium:

[M(H_{2}O)_{6}]^{2+} + [M'(H_{2}O)_{6}]^{3+} ⇌ [M(H_{2}O)_{6}]^{3+} + [M'(H_{2}O)_{6}]^{2+}

Standard redox potential for the couple M^{2+}, M^{3+} (V)
V	Cr	Mn	Fe	Co
−0.26	−0.41	+1.51	+0.77	+1.82

shows the increasing stability of the lower oxidation state as atomic number increases. The very large value for the manganese couple is a consequence of the fact that octahedral manganese(II) has zero crystal field stabilization energy (CFSE) but manganese(III) has 3 units of CFSE.

Using labels to keep track of the metals, the self-exchange process is written as:

$$\ce{[M(H2O)6]^2+} + \ce{[M^\star (H2O)6]^3+} \longrightarrow \ce{[M^\star (H2O)6]^3+} + \ce{[M(H2O)6]^2+}$$

The rates of electron exchange vary widely, the variations being attributable to differing reorganization energies: when the 2+ and 3+ ions differ widely in structure, the rates tend to be slow. The electron transfer reaction proceeds via an outer sphere electron transfer. Most often large reorganizational energies are associated with changes in the population of the e_{g} level, at least for octahedral complexes.

=== Acid–base reactions ===
Solutions of metal aquo complexes are acidic owing to the ionization of protons from the water ligands. In dilute solution chromium(III) aquo complex has a pK_{a} of about 4.3, affording a metal hydroxo complex:

[Cr(H_{2}O)_{6}]^{3+} ⇌ [Cr(H_{2}O)_{5}(OH)]^{2+} + H^{+}

Thus, the aquo ion is a weak acid, of comparable strength to acetic acid (pK_{a} of about 4.8). This pK_{a} is typical of the trivalent ions. The influence of the electronic configuration on acidity is shown by the fact that [Ru(H_{2}O)_{6}]^{3+} (pK_{a} = 2.7) is more acidic than [Rh(H_{2}O)_{6}]^{3+} (pK_{a} = 4), despite the fact that Rh(III) is expected to be more electronegative. This effect is related to the stabilization of the pi-donor hydroxide ligand by the (t_{2g})^{5} Ru(III) centre.

In concentrated solutions, some metal hydroxo complexes undergo condensation reactions, known as olation, to form polymeric species. Many minerals are assumed to form via olation. Aquo ions of divalent metal ions are less acidic than those of trivalent cations.

The hydrolyzed species often exhibit very different properties from the precursor hexaaquo complex. For example, water exchange in [Al(H_{2}O)_{5}OH]^{2+} is 20000 times faster than in [Al(H_{2}O)_{6}]^{3+}.

== See also ==
- Hydration number
- Ligand field theory
- Metal ammine complex
- Metal ions in aqueous solution
