= Hydration number =

Measure of solvency/solution

A sodium cation is solvated by water molecules with their partially negative charged lone pairs pointing inwards towards the positively charged sodium ion

The hydration number of a compound is defined as the number of molecules of water bonded to a central ion, often a metal cation. The hydration number is related to the broader concept of solvation number, the number of solvent molecules bonded to a central atom. The hydration number varies with the atom or ion of interest.

In aqueous solution, solutes interact with water molecules to varying degrees. Metal cations form aquo complexes, wherein the oxygen of water bind to the cation. This first coordination sphere is encased in further solvation shells, whereby water bonds to the coordinated water via hydrogen bonding. For charged species, the orientation of water molecules around the solute dependent on its radius and charge, with cations attracting water's electronegative oxygen and anions attracting the hydrogens. Uncharged compounds such as methane can also be solvated by water and also have a hydration number. Although solvation shells can contain inner and outer shell solvent-solute interactions, the hydration number generally focuses on the inner shell solvent molecules that directly interact with the solute. Sodium ions are typically surrounded by 4 to 6 water molecules in their primary hydration shell. This arrangement reflects the ion's charge density and size, leading to strong ion-dipole interactions with water molecules. In contrast, chloride ions generally have a hydration number closer to 6 due to their larger ionic radius and more distributed charge, which allows them to stabilize a larger number of water molecules in their hydration shell.

These hydration characteristics result from the dynamic nature of hydration shells, where water molecules frequently exchange positions between the inner and outer layers, influenced by the strength of ion-water interactions and water-water hydrogen bonding. This behavior has been observed through experimental studies and molecular dynamics simulations.

A variety of definitions exist for hydration number. One such approach counts the number of water molecules bound to the compound more strongly (by 13.3 kcal (56 kJ) per mole or more) than they are bound to other water molecules. Hydration number estimates are not limited to integer values (for instance, estimates for sodium include 4, 4.6, 5.3, 5.5, 5.6, 6, 6.5, and 8), with some of the spread of estimated values being due to differing detection methods.

== Determination of hydration number ==
Hydration numbers can be determined by a variety of experimental methods. These include Raman spectroscopy, neutron and X-ray scattering, luminescence, and NMR. Hydration numbers can change depending on whether the species is locked into a crystall or in solution. The apparent hydration number of a species can vary depending on which experimental method was used. The hydration number of large alkali metal cations are difficult to characterize.

=== Using NMR methods ===
NMR is the most informative technique for determining hydration numbers in solution. ^{1}H and ^{17}O NMR signals, even for paramagnetic species, can be interpreted to give information on hydration number. Aside from paramagnetism, another complication with NMR is the rate of exchange between bound and unbound water. The second coordination sphere is another aspect to be considered. Finally, ion pairing where the anion enters the solvation shell of the cation must be assessed.

=== X-ray crystallography ===
X-ray crystallography provides definitive information on hydration numbers, especially for cations. Most salts crystallize from water with aquo ligands bonded to the cation. Typical hydration numbers are six for first row transition metal ions and nine for lanthanides. Anions compete with aquo ligands for coordination to the cation. A major question concerns the relationship between structure of such hydrates in the crystal and in aqueous solution. X-ray crystallography provides little insight about the hydration numbers for anions and monocations, much less neutral solutes. In such cases, water is bonded so weakly that crystallization is a major perturbation on stoichiometry.

=== Using ion movement methods ===
Ion movement methods involve assessing the resistance to motion hence estimating an effective volume for a solvated ion and from that volume the solvation number. The motion may be from diffusion, mechanically engineered by changes to viscosity or caused by electrical means. Many of these methods give the sum of anion and cation contributions but some can work out values for independent ions. For monoatomic ions, decreasing ionic radius shows decreasing conductivity suggesting that the effective radius of the hydrated ion increases as ionic radius decreases (larger ions are less mobile so their ability to move charge is decreased). Once the mobility of the ions is determined it is possible to estimate diffusion coefficients and from those hydrodynamic radii. The hydrodynamic radii may be used to calculate the number of solvent molecules.

== Other hydrates ==
Even nonpolar entities hydrate and thus can in principle be assigned hydration numbers. For example even methane (CH_{4}) forms a hydrate called methane clathrate, which are stable under pressure.
