= Transition metal hydroxide complexes =

Transition metal hydroxide complexes are coordination complexes containing one or more hydroxide (OH^{−}) ligands. The inventory is very large.

== Hydroxide as a ligand ==
Hydroxide is classified as an X ligand in the covalent bond classification method. In the usual electron counting method, it is a one-electron ligand when terminal and a three-electron ligand when doubly bridging.

From the perspective of electronic structure, hydroxide is a strong pi-donor ligand, akin to fluoride. One consequence is that few polyhydroxide complexes are low-spin. Another consequence is that in its electron-precise complexes, the hydroxide ligand is nucleophilic.

== Representative complexes ==
Many hydroxo complexes are prepared by treating metal halides with hydroxide salts. Hydrolysis of basic ligands (amides, alkyls) also produces hydroxide complexes.

Only a few homoleptic hydroxide complexes are known. These include the d^{6} species [Pt(OH)_{6}]^{2−} and the d^{0} complexes [Ti(OH)_{6}]^{2−} and [Zr_{_{2}}(OH)_{8}(μ-OH)_{2}]^{2−}.

Many complexes are known where hydroxide shares the coordination sphere with other ligands, that is, hydroxide is a bridging ligand. Examples are {[Co(NH_{3})_{3}]_{2}(μ-OH)_{3}}^{3+} and its derivative {[Co(NH_{3})_{3}(H_{2}O)]_{2}(μ-OH)_{2}}^{4+}.

protonolysis of mu-OH cobalt complex

== Reactions ==
A prominent reaction of metal hydroxides involves their acid-base behavior. Protonation of metal hydroxides gives aquo complexes:

L_{n}M−OH + H^{+} ⇌ L_{n}M−OH^{+}_{2} where L_{n} is the ligand complement on the metal M

Aquo ligands are weak acids, of comparable strength to acetic acid (pK_{a} of about 4.8).

In principle, but not very commonly, metal hydroxides undergo deprotonation, yielding oxo complexes:

L_{n}M−OH ⇌ L_{n}M=O^{−} + H^{+}

Characteristically, hydroxide ligands are compact and basic. They tend to function as bridging ligands. One manifestation of this property is the preponderance of dimetallic and polymetallic hydroxide complexes. A practical consequence of this feature is the ready conversion of metal aquo complexes to precipitates of metal-hydroxides.

=== Bioinorganic chemistry ===
Active site of hemerythrin before and after oxygenation.

Hemerythrins, proteins responsible for oxygen (O_{2}) transport in some animals have a diiron hydroxide active site. The hydroxide ligand engages the bound O_{2} through hydrogen bonding.

The nucleophilicity of hydroxo ligands is relevant to the role of some M–OH centers in enzymology. For example, in carbonic anhydrase, a zinc hydroxide binds carbon dioxide:

L_{n}M−OH + CO_{2} ⇌ L_{n}MO−O−CO_{2}H

The oxygen evolving complex (OEC) consists of a Mn–Ca–O–OH cluster that is responsible for the biosynthesis of O_{2}. It is proposed that the O–O bond-forming step involves a hydroxide ligand.

Metalloproteinases catalyze the hydrolysis of peptide bonds. The catalytic centers in such enzymes often feature metal hydroxides.
