= Zirconium(IV) hydroxide =

Identifiers
CAS Number	14475-63-9
3D model (JSmol)	Interactive image
ChemSpider	76194
ECHA InfoCard	100.034.959
EC Number	238-472-7
PubChem CID	84465
UNII	T5YIC9E1JX
CompTox Dashboard (EPA)	DTXSID5065774
- InChI: InChI=1S/4H2O.Zr/h4*1H2;/q;;;;+4/p-4 Key: HAIMOVORXAUUQK-UHFFFAOYSA-J; InChI=1/4H2O.Zr/h4*1H2;/q;;;;+4/p-4 Key: HAIMOVORXAUUQK-XBHQNQODAM
- SMILES: [Zr+4].[OH-].[OH-].[OH-].[OH-]

Properties
Chemical formula	Zr(OH)_{4}
Molar mass	159.253 g/mol
Appearance	white filter cake
Density	3.25 g/cm^{3}, solid
Melting point	550 °C (1,022 °F; 823 K) decomposes
Solubility in water	0.02 g/100 mL (20 °C)

Hazards
- GHS labelling
Pictograms	(GHS07: Exclamation mark)
Signal word	Warning
Hazard statements	H315, H319, H335
Precautionary statements	P261, P264, P271, P280, P302+P352, P304+P340, P305+P351+P338, P312, P332+P313, P337+P313, P362, P403+P233, P405, P501
- Except where otherwise noted, data are given for materials in their standard state (at 25 °C [77 °F], 100 kPa). verify (what is ?) Infobox references

Zirconium (IV) hydroxide, often called hydrous zirconia is an ill-defined material or family of materials variously described as ZrO_{2}·nH_{2}O and Zr(OH)_{4}·nH_{2}O. All are white solids with low solubility in water. These materials are widely employed in the preparation of solid acid catalysts.

These materials are generated by mild base hydrolysis of zirconium halides and nitrates. A typical precursor is zirconium oxychloride.

== See also ==
- Zirconium dioxide
- Hydrous zirconia
- Sulfated zirconia
- Zirconium
- Transition metal hydroxide
