= Germanium(II) hydroxide =

Chemical compound

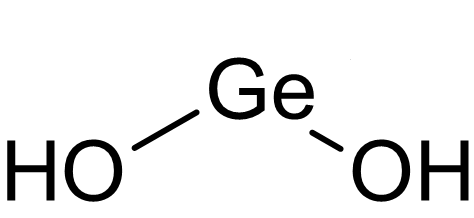

Germanium(II) hydroxide, normally written as Ge(OH)_{2}, is a poorly characterised compound, sometimes called hydrous germanium(II) oxide or germanous hydroxide. It was first reported by Winkler in 1886.

== Properties and preparation ==
Germanium(II) hydroxide is formed as a white or yellow precipitate when base is added to solutions containing Ge^{II}, produced for example by the reduction of an acid solution of germanium dioxide, GeO_{2}, with hypophosphorous acid, H_{3}PO_{2}, or alternatively by hydrolysis of GeCl_{2}. The initial precipitate, which has no definite stoichiometry, can be represented by GeO·xH_{2}O, Ge(OH)_{2}·xH_{2}O, or loosely Ge(OH)_{2}. It is only slightly soluble in water or alkali and not appreciably soluble in perchloric acid, HClO_{4}, but is soluble in hydrochloric acid, HCl. On digestion with sodium hydroxide, NaOH, it yields a brown insoluble compound, which after drying in vacuo forms a brown pyrophoric substance with the approximate stoichiometry of (HGe)_{2}O_{3}. On the basis of the infrared spectrum, (HGe)_{2}O_{3} may contain a germanium hydrogen bond, Ge-H.
