= Vanadyl sulfate =

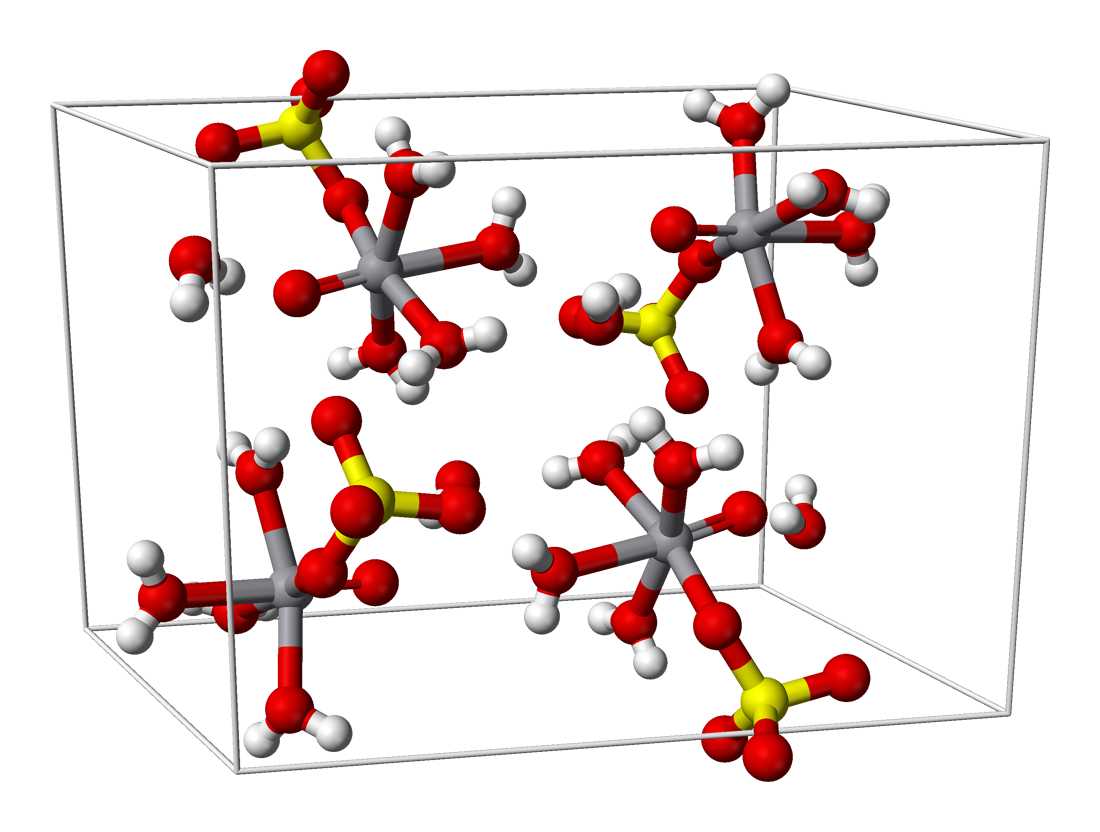
- Vanadyl sulfate

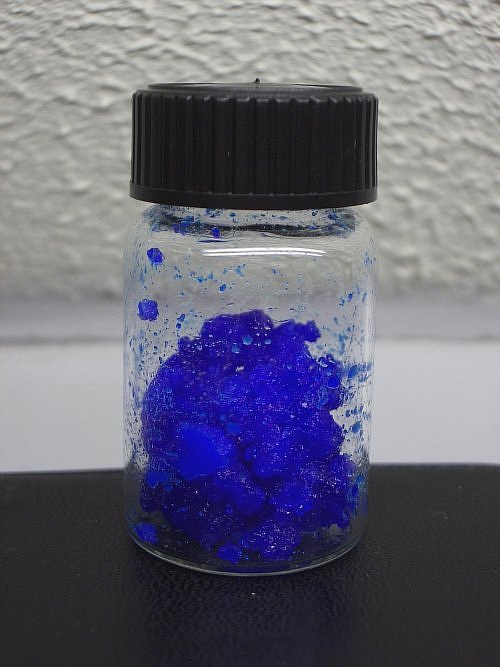

Names
- IUPAC name Oxovanadium(2+) sulfate
- Other names Basic vanadium(IV) sulfate Vanadium(IV) oxide sulfate Vanadium(IV) oxysulfate

Identifiers
CAS Number	Anhydrous: 27774-13-6; Pentahydrate: 12439-96-2
3D model (JSmol)	Anhydrous: Interactive image; Pentahydrate: Interactive image
ChemSpider	Anhydrous: 31347; Pentahydrate: 146243
ECHA InfoCard	100.044.214
PubChem CID	Anhydrous: 34007; Pentahydrate: 167150
RTECS number	Anhydrous: YW1925000
UNII	Anhydrous: 6DU9Y533FA
CompTox Dashboard (EPA)	Anhydrous: DTXSID4021428
- InChI: InChI=1S/H2O4S.O.V/c1-5(2,3)4;;/h(H2,1,2,3,4);;/q;;+2/p-2 Key: UUUGYDOQQLOJQA-UHFFFAOYSA-L; Pentahydrate: InChI=1S/H2O4S.5H2O.O.V/c1-5(2,3)4;;;;;;;/h(H2,1,2,3,4);5*1H2;;/q;;;;;;;+2/p-2 Key: YGYBXHQARYQUAY-UHFFFAOYSA-L
- SMILES: Anhydrous: O=S(=O)([O-])[O-].O=[V+2]; Pentahydrate: O.O.O.O.O.O=S(=O)([O-])[O-].O=[V+2]

Properties
Chemical formula	H_{10}O_{10}SV
Molar mass	253.07 g·mol^{−1}
Appearance	Blue solid
Melting point	105 °C (221 °F; 378 K) decomposes
Solubility in water	Soluble

Hazards
- Occupational safety and health (OHS/OSH)
Main hazards	Irritant
Flash point	Non-flammble

Related compounds
Other anions	Vanadyl chloride Vanadyl nitrate
Other cations	Vanadium(III) sulfate
Related compounds	Vanadyl acetylacetonate
- Except where otherwise noted, data are given for materials in their standard state (at 25 °C [77 °F], 100 kPa). verify (what is ?) Infobox references

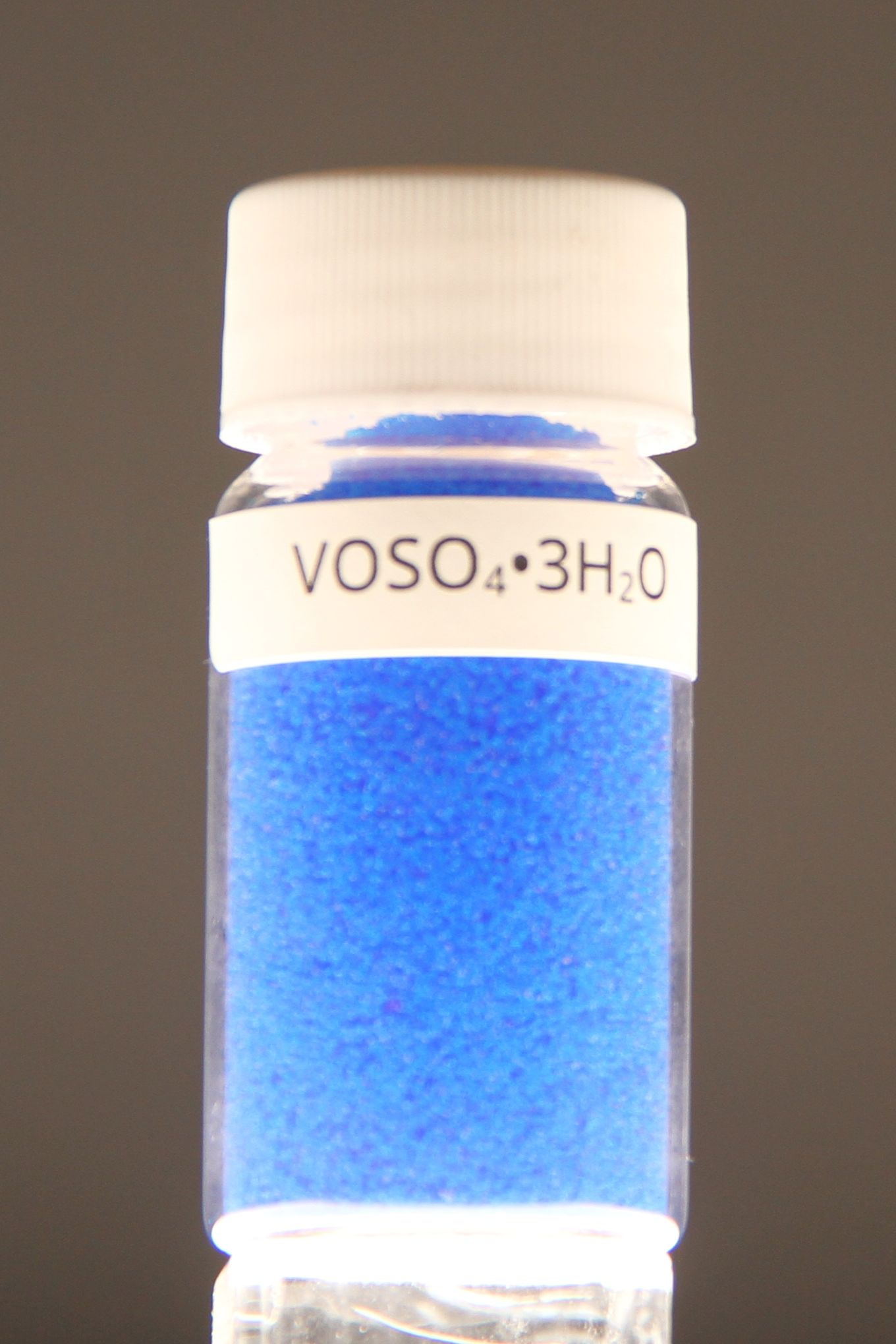
Vanadyl sulfate trihydrate

Vanadyl(IV) sulfate describes a collection of inorganic compounds of vanadium with the formula, VOSO_{4}(H_{2}O)_{x} where 0 ≤ x ≤ 6. The pentahydrate is common. This hygroscopic blue salt is one of the most common sources of vanadium in the laboratory, reflecting its high stability. It features the vanadyl ion, VO^{2+}, which has been called the "most stable diatomic ion".

Vanadyl sulfate is an intermediate in the extraction of vanadium from petroleum residues, one commercial source of vanadium.

== Synthesis, structure, and reactions ==
Vanadyl sulfate is most commonly obtained by reduction of vanadium pentoxide with sulfur dioxide:

V_{2}O_{5} + 7 H_{2}O + SO_{2} + H_{2}SO_{4} → 2 [V(O)(H_{2}O)_{4}]SO_{4}

From aqueous solution, the salt crystallizes as the pentahydrate, the fifth water is not bound to the metal in the solid. Viewed as a coordination complex, the ion is octahedral, with oxo, four equatorial water ligands, and a monodentate sulfate. The trihydrate has also been examined by crystallography. A hexahydrate exists below 13.6 °C (286.8 K). Two polymorphs of anhydrous VOSO_{4} are known.

The V=O bond distance is 160 pm, about 50 pm shorter than the V–OH_{2} bonds. In solution, the sulfate ion dissociates rapidly.

Being widely available, vanadyl sulfate is a common precursor to other vanadyl derivatives, such as vanadyl acetylacetonate:

[V(O)(H_{2}O)_{4}]SO_{4} + 2 C_{5}H_{8}O_{2} + Na_{2}CO_{3} → [V(O)(C_{5}H_{7}O_{2})_{2}] + Na_{2}SO_{4} + 5 H_{2}O + CO_{2}

In acidic solution, oxidation of vanadyl sulfate gives yellow-coloured vanadyl(V) derivatives. Reduction, e.g. by zinc, gives vanadium(III) and vanadium(II) derivatives, which are characteristically green and violet, respectively.

== Occurrence in nature ==
Like most water-soluble sulfates, vanadyl sulfate is only rarely found in nature. The anhydrous form occurs as pauflerite, a mineral of fumarolic origin. Hydrated forms include a hexahydrate (stanleyite), pentahydrates (minasragrite, orthominasragrite, and anorthominasragrite) and a trihydrate (bobjonesite).

== Medical research ==
Vanadyl sulfate is a component of food supplements and experimental drugs. Vanadyl sulfate exhibits insulin-like effects.

Vanadyl sulfate has been extensively studied in the field of diabetes research as a potential means of increasing insulin sensitivity. No evidence indicates that oral vanadium supplementation improves glycaemic control. Treatment with vanadium often results in gastrointestinal side-effects, primarily diarrhea.

Vanadyl sulfate is also marketed as a health supplement, often for bodybuilding. Deficiencies in vanadium result in reduced growth in rats. Its effectiveness for bodybuilding has not been proven; some evidence suggests that athletes who take it are merely experiencing a placebo effect.
