= Mercury(II) hydroxide =

Names
- IUPAC name mercury dihydroxide

Identifiers
CAS Number	12135-13-6
3D model (JSmol)	Interactive image
ChemSpider	14227333
PubChem CID	12989292
CompTox Dashboard (EPA)	DTXSID60923781
- InChI: InChI=1S/Hg.2H2O/h;2*1H2/q+2;;/p-2
- SMILES: [Hg+2].[OH-].[OH-]

Properties
Chemical formula	H_{2}HgO_{2}
Molar mass	234.605
Magnetic susceptibility (χ)	−100.00·10^{−6} cm^{3}/mol
- Except where otherwise noted, data are given for materials in their standard state (at 25 °C [77 °F], 100 kPa). Infobox references

Mercury(II) hydroxide or mercuric hydroxide is the metal hydroxide with the chemical formula Hg(OH)_{2}. The compound has not been isolated in pure form, although it has been the subject of several studies. Attempts to isolate Hg(OH)_{2} yield yellow solid HgO.

The solid has been produced by irradiating a frozen mixture of mercury, oxygen and hydrogen. The mixture had been produced by evaporating mercury atoms at 50 °C into a gas consisting of neon, argon or deuterium (in separate experiments) plus 2 to 8% hydrogen and 0.2 to 2.0% oxygen. The mixture was then condensed at 5 kelvins onto a caesium iodide window, through which it could be irradiated.
