= 2,3,4-Pentanetrione =

Names
- Preferred IUPAC name Pentane-2,3,4-trione
- Other names Pentanetrione; Dimethyltriketone

Identifiers
| CAS Number | 921-11-9 |
| 3D model (JSmol) | Interactive image |
| ChemSpider | 120466 |
| PubChem CID | 136703 |
| UNII | 84GH569GKT |
| CompTox Dashboard (EPA) | DTXSID30238859 |
- InChI: InChI=1S/C5H6O3/c1-3(6)5(8)4(2)7/h1-2H3 Key: MVDYEFQVZNBPPH-UHFFFAOYSA-N
- SMILES: CC(=O)C(=O)C(=O)C

Properties
| Chemical formula | C_{5}H_{6}O_{3} |
| Molar mass | 114.100 g·mol^{−1} |
| Appearance | red-orange oil |

Related compounds
| Related triketones | 2,3,4-Triketohexane, 2,3,5-Triketohexane, 2,3,5-Triketohexane, 2,4,6-Triketoheptane |
- Except where otherwise noted, data are given for materials in their standard state (at 25 °C [77 °F], 100 kPa). Infobox references

2,3,4-Pentanetrione (or IUPAC name pentane-2,3,4-trione, triketopentane or dimethyl triketone) is the simplest linear triketone, a ketone with three C=O groups. It is an organic molecule with formula CH_{3}COCOCOCH_{3}.

== Production ==
2,3,4-Pentanetrione can be made by oxidizing 2,4-pentanedione with selenium dioxide. Ludwig Wolff made the 2,3 oxime by reacting hydroxylamine with isonitrosoacetylacetone in cold, aqueous, concentrated solution.

Yet other ways to make triones start from a β-dione, and oxidise the carbon at the α position, between the two ketone groups. Different methods include reaction with bromine to make a dibromide, and then reacting with acetaldehyde and hydrolysing. Nitrogen oxides can also be used. Another way is by reacting 2,4-pentandedione with p-nitroso-N,N-dimethylaniline; forming an α-diazo-β-dicarbonyl derivative compound, and then reacting that with triphenylphosphine, and then hydrolyzing with sodium nitrite solution. Or the α-diazo-β-dicarbonyl derivative can be treated with tert-butylhypochlorite.

== Properties ==
2,3,4-Pentanetrione appears as an orangy-red oil. The more intense colour is due to the greater conjugation of double bonds, and potential resonance. The type of colour centre is called a dependent chromophore, as when there are fewer C=O groups the colour is less intense or absent. So diacetyl with two carbonyls groups is yellow, and acetone with one has no colour.

At a reduced pressure of 20 mmHg it boils at 60 °C. It is hygroscopic.

The odour is strong and not bad.

== Reactions ==
On absorbing water, perhaps from the atmosphere, 2,3,4-pentanetrione forms a hydrate. The hydrate melts at 52 °C. The hydrate with formula CH_{3}COC(OH)_{2}COCH_{3} is colourless.

2,3,4-Pentanetrione is a strong reducing agent. Thermal decomposition catalyzed by copper sulfate results in carbon dioxide and diacetyl.

2,3,4-Pentanetrione reacts with hydrogen peroxide to yield acetic acid and carbon monoxide. Adding HOOH between C2 and C4 yields a cyclic intermediate which decomposes.

With light or organic peroxides, a free radical reaction can take place (as with triketones), whereby the molecule is slit into CH_{3}COCO^{•} and CH_{3}CO^{•} fragments. These can combine with intact molecules or each other to form other ketones.

When heating 2,3,4-pentanetrione with oxygen, the oxidation products are diacetyl, acetic acid, water and carbon dioxide.

Alkalis convert it into acetic acid and formaldehyde.

2,3,4-Pentanetrione does a condensation reaction with o-phenylenediamine to yield methyl-quinoxaline-2-methylketone, a heterocyclic dicycle. In this the carbon number 2 and 3 react with the amine groups, leaving the CO on number 5 alone.

Another condensation can happen with 2,5,6-triamino-4(3H)pyrimidinone giving 6-acetyl-2-amino-7-methyl-4(3H)pteridinone.

Grignard agents react. Phenyl magnesium bromide in excess reacting with 2,3,4-pentanetrione gives phenylacetylcarbinol and also methyldiphenylcarbinol.

== Derivatives ==
Derivatives include 2,3,4-pentanetrione-3-oxime, 2,3,4-pentanetrione-3-(O-methyloxime), 2,3,4-pentanetrione-2-oxime, 2,3,4-pentanetrione-2,3-dioxime, 2,3,4-pentanetrionetrioxime, 2,3,4-pentanetrione semicarbazone, 2,3,4-pentanetrione phenylhydrazone, 2,3,4-pentanetrione bis(phenylhydrazone).

The 3-oxime melts at 75 °C and the bis(semicarbazone) has a melting point of 221 °C.
