= Vanadium(III) sulfate =

Names
- IUPAC name Vanadium(III) sulfate
- Other names Vanadium trisulfate Divanadium trisulfate

Identifiers
CAS Number	13701-70-7
3D model (JSmol)	Interactive image; dihydrate: Interactive image
ChemSpider	19990317
ECHA InfoCard	100.033.827
EC Number	237-226-6
PubChem CID	166888
UNII	1EQF3LAK57
CompTox Dashboard (EPA)	DTXSID90890715
- InChI: InChI=1S/3H2O4S.2V/c3*1-5(2,3)4;;/h3*(H2,1,2,3,4);;/q;;;2*+3/p-6 Key: LZBNYDQIYWOAPC-UHFFFAOYSA-H; dihydrate: InChI=1S/3H2O4S.2H2O.2V/c3*1-5(2,3)4;;;;/h3*(H2,1,2,3,4);2*1H2;;/q;;;;;2*+3/p-6 Key: YOTDVGFJBHYEPE-UHFFFAOYSA-H
- SMILES: [O-]S(=O)(=O)[O-].[O-]S(=O)(=O)[O-].[O-]S(=O)(=O)[O-].[V+3].[V+3]; dihydrate: O.O.O=S(=O)([O-])[O-].O=S(=O)([O-])[O-].O=S(=O)([O-])[O-].[V+3].[V+3]

Properties
Chemical formula	V_{2}(SO_{4})_{3}
Molar mass	390.074 g/mol
Appearance	Yellow powder
Melting point	400 °C (752 °F; 673 K) Decomposes
Solubility in water	Slightly soluble

Hazards
- GHS labelling
Pictograms	(GHS07: Exclamation mark)
Signal word	Warning
Hazard statements	H302
Precautionary statements	P264, P270, P301+P317, P330, P501
- Except where otherwise noted, data are given for materials in their standard state (at 25 °C [77 °F], 100 kPa). Infobox references

Vanadium(III) sulfate is the inorganic compound with the formula V_{2}(SO_{4})_{3}. It is a pale yellow solid that is stable to air, in contrast to most vanadium(III) compounds. It slowly dissolves in water to give the green aquo complex [V(H_{2}O)_{6}]^{3+}.

The compound is prepared by treating V_{2}O_{5} in sulfuric acid with elemental sulfur:

V_{2}O_{5} + S + 3 H_{2}SO_{4} → V_{2}(SO_{4})_{3} + SO_{2} + 3 H_{2}O

This transformation is a rare example of a reduction by elemental sulfur.

When heated in vacuum at or slightly below 410 °C, it decomposes into vanadyl sulfate (VOSO_{4}) and SO_{2}. Vanadium(III) sulfate is stable in dry air but upon exposure to moist air for several weeks forms a green hydrate form.

Vanadium(III) sulfate is a reducing agent.
