= Barium nitrate =

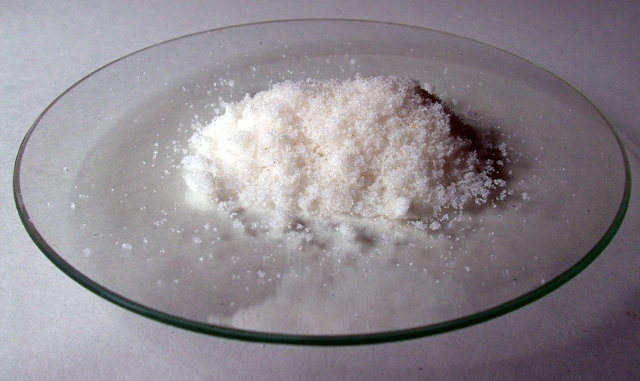
- barium nitrate

Names
- Other names Barium dinitrate, barium salt

Identifiers
CAS Number	10022-31-8
3D model (JSmol)	Interactive image
ChEBI	CHEBI:190440
ChEMBL	ChEMBL3184584
ChemSpider	23184
ECHA InfoCard	100.030.006
EC Number	233-020-5
PubChem CID	24798
RTECS number	CQ9625000
UNII	MDC5SW56XC
UN number	1446
CompTox Dashboard (EPA)	DTXSID8049200
- InChI: InChI=1S/Ba.2NO3/c;2*2-1(3)4/q+2;2*-1 Key: IWOUKMZUPDVPGQ-UHFFFAOYSA-N; InChI=1/Ba.2NO2/c;2*2-1(3)4/q+2;2*-1 Key: IWOUKMZUPDVPGQ-UHFFFAOYAA
- SMILES: [Ba+2].[O-][N+]([O-])=O.[O-][N+]([O-])=O

Properties
Chemical formula	Ba(NO_{3})_{2}
Molar mass	261.335 g·mol^{−1}
Appearance	white, lustrous crystals
Odor	odorless
Density	3.24 g/cm^{3}
Melting point	592 °C (1,098 °F; 865 K) (decomposes)
Solubility in water	4.95 g/100mL (0 °C (32 °F; 273 K)); 10.5 g/100mL (25 °C (77 °F; 298 K)); 34.4 g/100mL (100 °C (212 °F; 373 K))
Solubility in acetone	slightly soluble
Solubility in ethanol	slightly soluble
Magnetic susceptibility (χ)	−66.5×10^{−6} cm^{3}/mol
Refractive index (n_{D})	1.5659

Structure
Crystal structure	cubic

Thermochemistry
Heat capacity (C)	151.4 J/(mol K)
Std molar entropy (S^{⦵}_{298})	214 J/(mol K)
Std enthalpy of formation (Δ_{f}H^{⦵}_{298})	-988 kJ/mol

Hazards
- GHS labelling
Pictograms	(GHS03: Oxidizing) (GHS06: Toxic) (GHS07: Exclamation mark)
Signal word	Danger
Hazard statements	H272, H301, H319, H332
Precautionary statements	P210, P220, P221, P261, P264, P270, P271, P280, P301+P310+P330, P304+P340+P312, P305+P351+P338, P337+P313, P370+P378, P405, P501
NFPA 704 (fire diamond)	3 0 2 OX
Threshold limit value (TLV)	0.5 mg/m^{3} (TWA)
- Lethal dose or concentration (LD, LC)
LD_{50} (median dose)	50–300 mg/kg (rat, female, oral)
LD_{Lo} (lowest published)	79 mg/kg (rabbit, oral, as barium); 421 mg/kg (dog, oral, as barium)
- NIOSH (US health exposure limits)
PEL (Permissible)	0.5 mg/m^{3} (TWA)
REL (Recommended)	0.5 mg/m^{3} (TWA)
IDLH (Immediate danger)	50 mg/m^{3}

Related compounds
Other anions	Barium carbonate; Barium chloride; Barium sulfate
Other cations	Calcium nitrate; Strontium nitrate

Supplementary data page
- Barium nitrate (data page)
- Except where otherwise noted, data are given for materials in their standard state (at 25 °C [77 °F], 100 kPa). verify (what is ?) Infobox references

Barium nitrate is the inorganic compound of barium with the nitrate anion, having the chemical formula Ba(NO_{3})_{2}. It, like most barium salts, is colorless, toxic, and water-soluble. It burns with a green flame and is an oxidizer; the compound is commonly used in pyrotechnics.

== Manufacture, occurrence, and reactions ==
Barium nitrate is manufactured by two processes that start with the main source material for barium, the carbonate. The first involves dissolving barium carbonate in nitric acid, allowing any iron impurities to precipitate, then filtered, evaporated, and crystallized. The second requires combining barium sulfide with nitric acid.

It occurs naturally as the very rare mineral nitrobarite.

At elevated temperatures, barium nitrate decomposes to barium oxide:

2 Ba(NO_{3})_{2} → 2 BaO + 4 NO_{2} + O_{2}

== Applications ==
Barium nitrate is used in the production of BaO-containing materials. It is also used in the vacuum tube industry.

=== Military ===
Although no longer produced, Baratol is an explosive composed of barium nitrate, TNT and binder; the high density of barium nitrate results in baratol being quite dense as well. Barium nitrate mixed with aluminium powder is a sometimes-used formula for flash powder, and is highly explosive.

It is mixed with thermite to form Thermate-TH3, used in military thermite grenades. Barium nitrate was also a primary ingredient in the "SR 365" incendiary charge used by the British in the De Wilde incendiary ammunition with which they armed their interceptor fighters, such as the Hawker Hurricane and Supermarine Spitfire, during the Battle of Britain.

== Safety ==
Like all soluble barium compounds, barium nitrate is toxic by ingestion or inhalation.

Solutions of sulfate salts such as Epsom salts or sodium sulfate may be given as first aid for barium poisoning, as they precipitate the barium as the insoluble (and non-toxic) barium sulfate.

Inhalation may also cause irritation to the respiratory tract and baritosis.

While skin or eye contact is less harmful than ingestion or inhalation, it can still result in irritation, itching, redness, and pain.
