= Barium hydroxide =

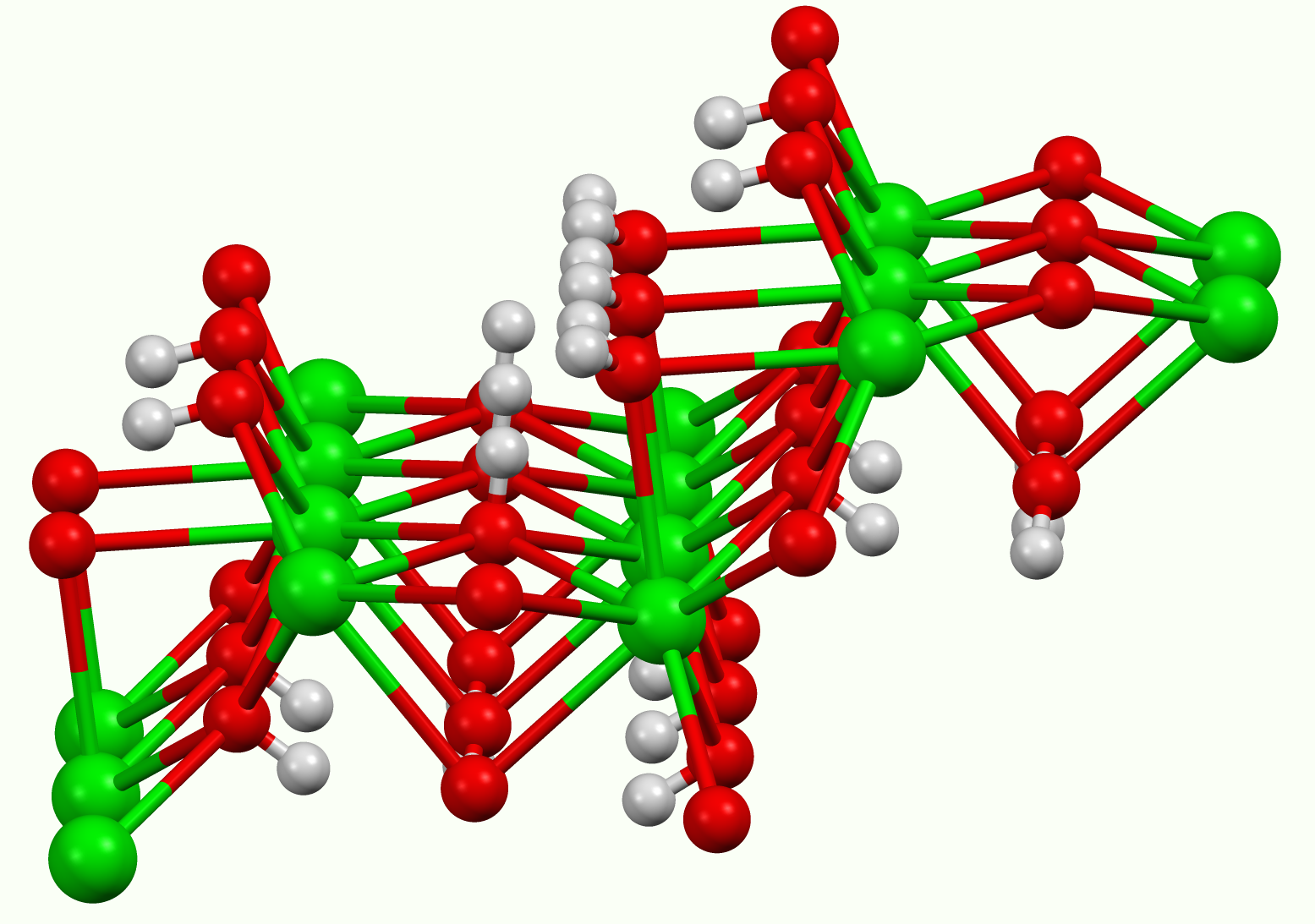

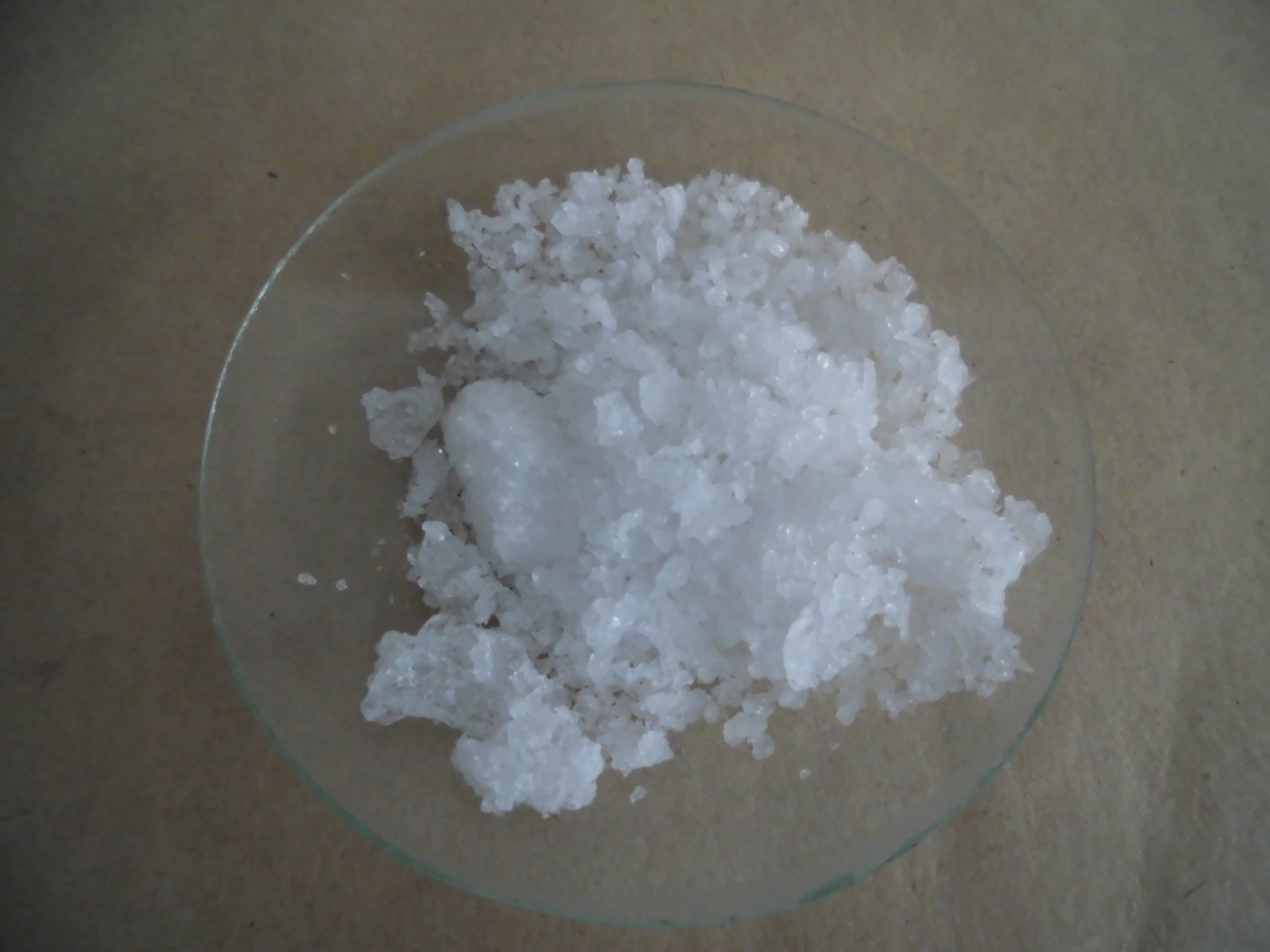

Identifiers
CAS Number	17194-00-2; 22326-55-2 (monohydrate); 12230-71-6 (octahydrate)
3D model (JSmol)	Interactive image
ChEBI	CHEBI:32592
ChemSpider	26408
ECHA InfoCard	100.037.470
EC Number	241-234-5
Gmelin Reference	846955
PubChem CID	28387
RTECS number	CQ9200000
UNII	1OHB71MYBK; P27GID97XM (monohydrate); L5Q5V03TBN (octahydrate)
CompTox Dashboard (EPA)	DTXSID10892155
- InChI: InChI=1S/Ba.2H2O/h;2*1H2/q+2;;/p-2 Key: RQPZNWPYLFFXCP-UHFFFAOYSA-L; InChI=1/Ba.2H2O/h;2*1H2/q+2;;/p-2 Key: RQPZNWPYLFFXCP-NUQVWONBAR
- SMILES: [Ba+2].[OH-].[OH-]

Properties
Chemical formula	Ba(OH)_{2}
Molar mass	171.34 g/mol (anhydrous); 189.355 g/mol (monohydrate); 315.46 g/mol (octahydrate)
Appearance	white solid
Density	3.743 g/cm^{3} (monohydrate); 2.18 g/cm^{3} (octahydrate, 16 °C)
Melting point	78 °C (172 °F; 351 K) (octahydrate); 300 °C (monohydrate); 407 °C (anhydrous)
Boiling point	780 °C (1,440 °F; 1,050 K)
Basicity (pK_{b})	0.15 (first OH^{–}), 0.64 (second OH^{–})
Magnetic susceptibility (χ)	−53.2·10^{−6} cm^{3}/mol
Refractive index (n_{D})	1.50 (octahydrate)

Structure
Crystal structure	octahedral

Thermochemistry
Std enthalpy of formation (Δ_{f}H^{⦵}_{298})	−944.7 kJ·mol^{−1}
Enthalpy of fusion (Δ_{f}H^{⦵}_{fus})	16 kJ·mol^{−1}

Hazards
- GHS labelling
Pictograms	(GHS05: Corrosive) (GHS07: Exclamation mark)
Signal word	Danger
Hazard statements	H302, H314, H332, H412
NFPA 704 (fire diamond)	3 1 1
Flash point	Non-flammable
- Lethal dose or concentration (LD, LC)
LD_{50} (median dose)	308 mg/kg (rat, oral)
Safety data sheet (SDS)	Fisher Scientific

Related compounds
Other anions	Barium oxide Barium peroxide
Other cations	Calcium hydroxide Strontium hydroxide

Supplementary data page
- Barium hydroxide (data page)
- Except where otherwise noted, data are given for materials in their standard state (at 25 °C [77 °F], 100 kPa). verify (what is ?) Infobox references

Barium hydroxide is a chemical compound with the chemical formula Ba(OH)_{2}. The monohydrate (x = 1), known as baryta or baryta-water, is one of the principal compounds of barium. This white granular monohydrate is the usual commercial form.

== Preparation and structure ==
Barium hydroxide can be prepared by dissolving barium oxide (BaO) in water:

BaO + H_{2}O → Ba(OH)_{2}

It crystallises as the octahydrate, which converts to the monohydrate upon heating in air. At 100 °C in a vacuum, the monohydrate will yield BaO and water. The monohydrate adopts a layered structure (see picture above). The Ba^{2+} centers adopt a square antiprismatic geometry. Each Ba^{2+} center is bound by two water ligands and six hydroxide ligands, which are respectively doubly and triply bridging to neighboring Ba^{2+} centre sites. In the octahydrate, the individual Ba^{2+} centers are again eight coordinate but do not share ligands.

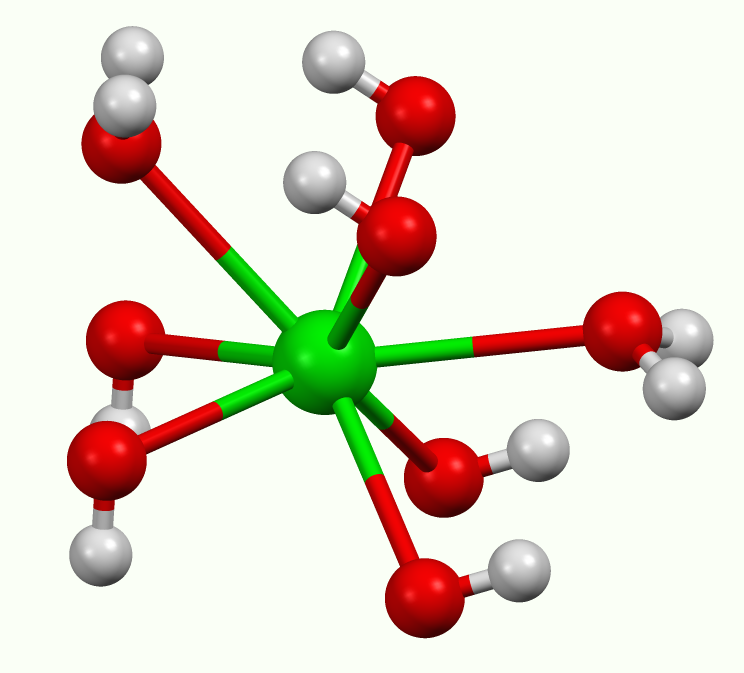
Coordination sphere about an individual barium ion in Ba(OH)_{2}.H_{2}O.

== Uses ==
Industrially, barium hydroxide is used as the precursor to other barium compounds. The monohydrate is used to dehydrate and remove sulfate from various products. This application exploits the very low solubility of barium sulfate. This industrial application is also applied to laboratory uses.

=== Laboratory uses ===
Barium hydroxide is used in analytical chemistry for the titration of weak acids, particularly organic acids. Its aqueous solution, if clear, is guaranteed to be free of carbonate, unlike those of sodium hydroxide and potassium hydroxide, as barium carbonate is insoluble in water. This allows the use of indicators such as phenolphthalein or thymolphthalein (with alkaline colour changes) without the risk of titration errors due to the presence of carbonate ions, which are much less basic.

Barium hydroxide is occasionally used in organic synthesis as a strong base, for example for the hydrolysis of esters and nitriles, and as a base in aldol condensations.

There are several uses for barium hydroxide such as to hydrolyse one of the two equivalent ester groups in dimethyl hendecanedioate.

Barium hydroxide has also been used in the decarboxylation of amino acids liberating barium carbonate in the process.

It is also used in the preparation of cyclopentanone, diacetone alcohol and D-gulonic γ-lactone.

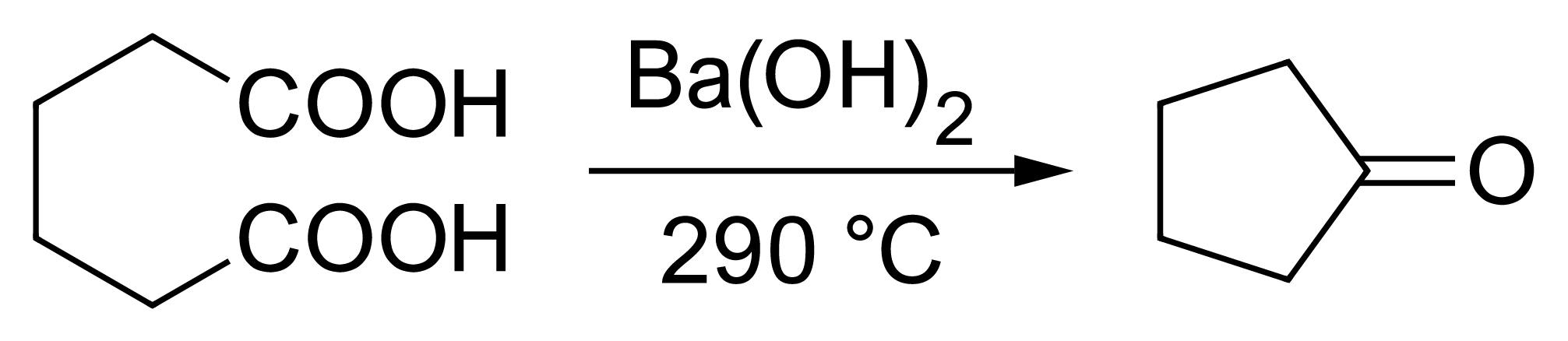

== Reactions ==
Barium hydroxide decomposes to barium oxide when heated to 800 °C. Reaction with carbon dioxide gives barium carbonate. Its aqueous solution, being highly alkaline, undergoes neutralization reactions with acids. It is especially useful on reactions that require the titrations of weak organic acids. Thus, it forms barium sulfate and barium phosphate with sulfuric and phosphoric acids, respectively. Reaction with hydrogen sulfide produces barium sulfide. Precipitation of many insoluble, or less soluble barium salts, may result from double replacement reaction when a barium hydroxide aqueous solution is mixed with many solutions of other metal salts.

Reactions of barium hydroxide with ammonium salts are strongly endothermic. The reaction of barium hydroxide octahydrate with ammonium chloride or ammonium thiocyanate is often used as a classroom chemistry demonstration, producing temperatures cold enough to freeze water and enough water to dissolve the resulting mixture.

== Safety ==
Barium hydroxide presents the same hazards such as skin irritation and burns as well as eye damage, just as the other strong bases and as other water-soluble barium compounds: it is corrosive and toxic.

== See also ==
- Baralyme
