= Celobar incident =

2003 pharmaceutical fraud in Brazil

The Celobar incident was a pharmaceutical fraud that occurred in Brazil in 2003, and resulted in the death of more than twenty X-ray patients by barium poisoning.

Laboratório Enila was a small Brazilian pharmaceutics manufacturer who made an oral X-ray contrast medium trademarked Celobar. The medium's main ingredient was pharmaceutics-grade barium sulfate (BaSO_{4}) imported from Germany. In 2003, without having the necessary expertise or authorization, they tried to manufacture BaSO_{4} in-house from much-cheaper technical-grade barium carbonate (BaCO_{3}). They saved US$100.

Non-reacted carbonate and other barium salts that remained in the adulterated product killed nine patients. The first death was Ricardo Diomedes, who had taken Celobar on May 21, 2003, at a clinic in Nova Iguaçu near Rio de Janeiro. A few hours later, he was suffering from vomiting, diarrhea, abdominal pains, and weakness; he died the next day in Nilópolis. Postmortem exams confirmed that barium poisoning was the cause of death. Analysis of the Celobar by the Oswaldo Cruz Institute showed up to 14% unreacted carbonate (the maximum allowed limit being 0.001%). The other eight deaths occurred in the state of Goiás, where most of the contaminated lot had been shipped.

Authorities were warned after the first deaths, recalled the lot, and closed the laboratory, which eventually went bankrupt.

On January 29, 2009, Enila's CEO (Márcio D'Icahahy Câmara Lima), and the chemist who carried out the synthesis (Antônio Carlos Fonseca da Silva) were sentenced to 20 and 22 years in jail, respectively.
