= Barium chloride =

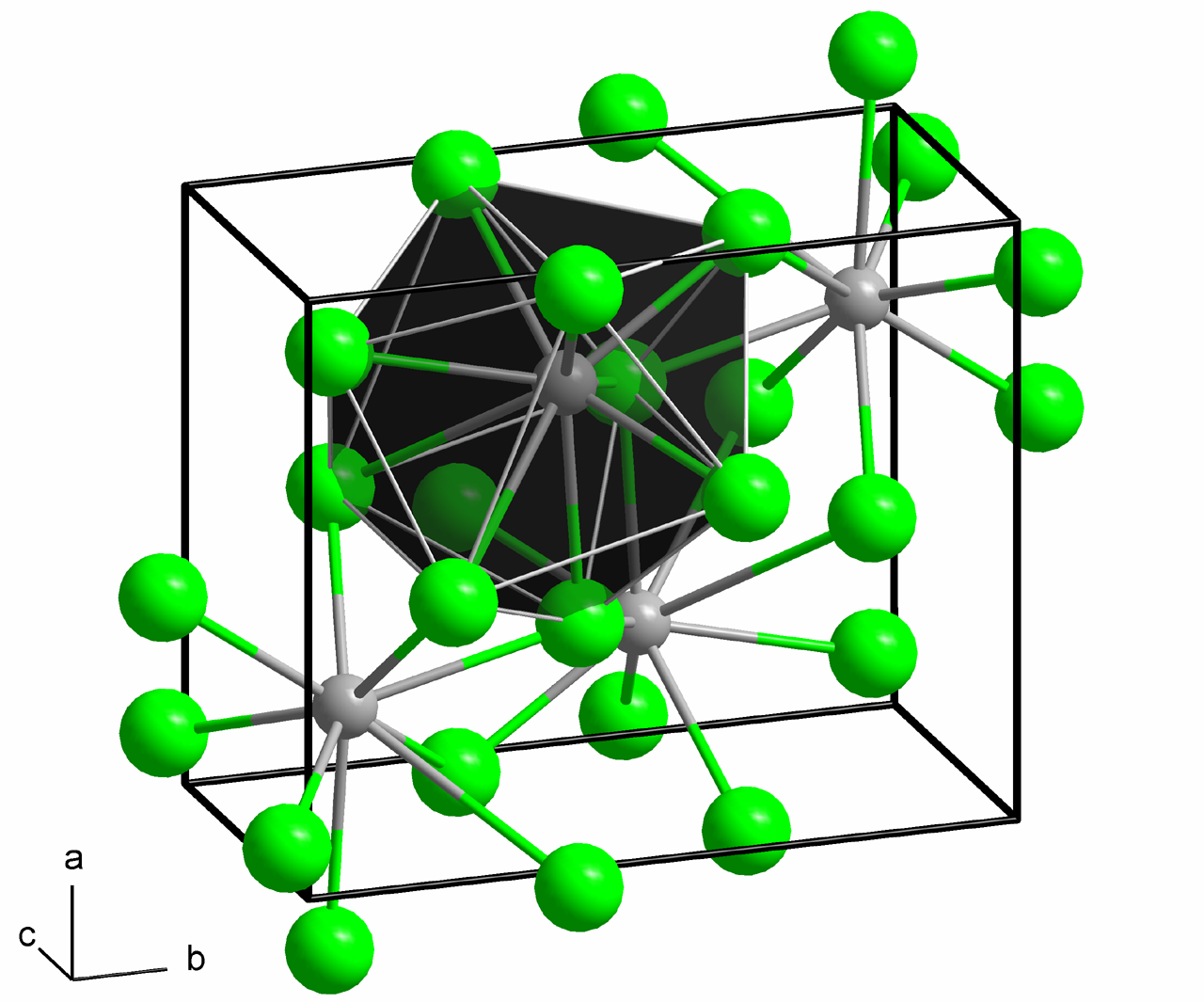

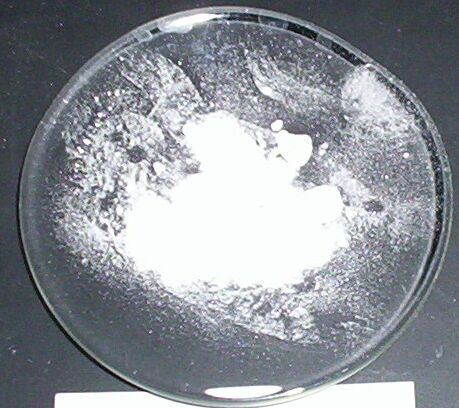

Names
- Other names: Barium dichloride; Barium muriate; Muryate of Barytes; Neutral barium chloride

Identifiers
CAS Number	10361-37-2; 10326-27-9 (dihydrate)
3D model (JSmol)	Interactive image
ChemSpider	23540
ECHA InfoCard	100.030.704
EC Number	233-788-1
PubChem CID	25204
RTECS number	CQ8750000 (anhydrous) CQ8751000 (dihydrate)
UNII	0VK51DA1T2; EL5GJ3U77E (dihydrate)
UN number	1564
CompTox Dashboard (EPA)	DTXSID7044508
- InChI: InChI=1S/Ba.2ClH/h;2*1H/q+2;;/p-2 Key: WDIHJSXYQDMJHN-UHFFFAOYSA-L; InChI=1/Ba.2ClH/h;2*1H/q+2;;/p-2 Key: WDIHJSXYQDMJHN-NUQVWONBAL
- SMILES: [Ba+2].[Cl-].[Cl-]

Properties
Chemical formula	BaCl_{2}
Molar mass	208.23 g/mol (anhydrous); 244.26 g/mol (dihydrate)
Appearance	White powder, or colourless or white crystals (anhydrous); Colourless rhomboidal crystals (dihydrate)
Odor	Odourless
Density	3.856 g/cm^{3} (anhydrous); 3.0979 g/cm^{3} (dihydrate)
Melting point	962 °C (1,764 °F; 1,235 K) (960 °C, dihydrate)
Boiling point	1,560 °C (2,840 °F; 1,830 K)
Solubility in water	31.2 g/(100 mL) (0 °C); 35.8 g/(100 mL) (20 °C); 59.4 g/(100 mL) (100 °C)
Solubility	Soluble in methanol, insoluble ethyl acetate, slightly soluble in hydrochloric acid and nitric acid, soluble in ethanol. The dihydrate of barium chloride is soluble in methanol, almost insoluble in ethanol, acetone and ethyl acetate.
Magnetic susceptibility (χ)	−72.6·10^{−6} cm^{3}/mol

Structure
Crystal structure	PbCl_{2}-type orthorhombic (anhydrous) monoclinic (dihydrate)
Coordination geometry	Of the Ba^{2+} cations: 8 (the fluorite polymorph); 9 (the cotunnite polymorph); 10 (the post-cotunnite polymorph at pressures of 7–10 GPa)

Thermochemistry
Heat capacity (C)	71.2 J/(mol K)
Std molar entropy (S^{⦵}_{298})	123.9 J/(mol·K)
Std enthalpy of formation (Δ_{f}H^{⦵}_{298})	−858.56 kJ/mol

Hazards
- Occupational safety and health (OHS/OSH)
Main hazards	Highly toxic, corrosive
- GHS labelling
Pictograms	(GHS06: Toxic)
Signal word	Danger
Hazard statements	H301, H302, H332
Precautionary statements	P261, P264, P270, P271, P301+P310, P304+P312, P304+P340, P312, P321, P330, P405, P501
NFPA 704 (fire diamond)	3 0 0
Flash point	Non-flammable
- Lethal dose or concentration (LD, LC)
LD_{50} (median dose)	78 mg/kg (rat, oral); 50 mg/kg (guinea pig, oral)
LD_{Lo} (lowest published)	112 mg/kg (as Ba) (rabbit, oral); 59 mg/kg (as Ba) (dog, oral); 46 mg/kg (as Ba) (mouse, oral)
- NIOSH (US health exposure limits)
PEL (Permissible)	TWA 0.5 mg/m^{3}
REL (Recommended)	TWA 0.5 mg/m^{3}
IDLH (Immediate danger)	50 mg/m^{3}
Safety data sheet (SDS)	NIH BaCl

Related compounds
Other anions	Barium fluoride; Barium bromide; Barium iodide
Other cations	Beryllium chloride; Magnesium chloride; Calcium chloride; Strontium chloride; Radium chloride; Lead chloride

Supplementary data page
- Barium chloride (data page)
- Except where otherwise noted, data are given for materials in their standard state (at 25 °C [77 °F], 100 kPa). verify (what is ?) Infobox references

Barium chloride is an inorganic compound with the formula BaCl_{2}. It is one of the most common water-soluble salts of barium. Like most other water-soluble barium salts, it is a white powder, highly toxic, and imparts a yellow-green coloration to a flame. It is also hygroscopic, converting to the dihydrate BaCl_{2}·2H_{2}O, which are colourless crystals with a bitter salty taste. It has limited use in the laboratory and industry.

== Preparation ==
On an industrial scale, barium chloride is prepared via a two step process from barite (barium sulfate). The first step requires high temperatures.

BaSO_{4} + 4 C → BaS + 4 CO

The second step requires reaction between barium sulfide and hydrogen chloride:

BaS + 2 HCl → BaCl_{2} + H_{2}S

or between barium sulfide and calcium chloride:

BaS + CaCl_{2} → CaS + BaCl_{2}

In place of HCl, chlorine can be used. Barium chloride is extracted out from the mixture with water. From water solutions of barium chloride, its dihydrate (BaCl_{2}·2H_{2}O) can be crystallized as colorless crystals.

Barium chloride can in principle be prepared by the reaction between barium hydroxide or barium carbonate with hydrogen chloride. These basic salts react with hydrochloric acid to give hydrated barium chloride.

Ba(OH)_{2} + 2 HCl → BaCl_{2} + 2 H_{2}O
BaCO_{3} + 2 HCl → BaCl_{2} + H_{2}O + CO_{2}

== Structure and properties ==
BaCl_{2} crystallizes in two forms (polymorphs). At room temperature, the compound is stable in the orthorhombic cotunnite (PbCl_{2}) structure, whereas the cubic fluorite structure (CaF_{2}) is stable between 925 and 963 °C. Both polymorphs accommodate the preference of the large Ba^{2+} ion for coordination numbers greater than six. The coordination of Ba^{2+} is 8 in the fluorite structure and 9 in the cotunnite structure. When cotunnite-structure BaCl_{2} is subjected to pressures of 7–10 GPa, it transforms to a third structure, a monoclinic post-cotunnite phase. The coordination number of Ba^{2+} increases from 9 to 10.

In aqueous solution BaCl_{2} behaves as a simple salt; in water it is a 1:2 electrolyte and the solution exhibits a neutral pH. Its solutions react with sulfate ion to produce a thick white solid precipitate of barium sulfate.

BaCl_{2} + Na_{2}SO_{4} → 2 NaCl + BaSO_{4}

This precipitation reaction is used in chlor-alkali plants to control the sulfate concentration in the feed brine for electrolysis.

Oxalate effects a similar reaction:

BaCl_{2} + Na_{2}C_{2}O_{4} → 2 NaCl + BaC_{2}O_{4}

When it is mixed with sodium hydroxide, it gives barium hydroxide, which is moderately soluble in water.

BaCl_{2} + 2 NaOH → 2 NaCl + Ba(OH)_{2}

BaCl_{2}·2H_{2}O is stable in the air at room temperature, but loses one water of crystallization above 55 °C (131 °F), becoming BaCl_{2}·H_{2}O, and becomes anhydrous above 121 °C (250 °F). BaCl_{2}·H_{2}O may be formed by shaking the dihydrate with methanol.

BaCl_{2} readily forms eutectics with alkali metal chlorides.

== Uses ==
Although inexpensive, barium chloride finds limited applications in the laboratory and industry.

Its main laboratory use is as a reagent for the gravimetric determination of sulfates. The sulfate compound being analyzed is dissolved in water and hydrochloric acid is added. When barium chloride solution is added, the sulfate present precipitates as barium sulfate, which is then filtered through ashless filter paper. The paper is burned off in a muffle furnace, the resulting barium sulfate is weighed, and the purity of the sulfate compound is thus calculated.

In industry, barium chloride is mainly used in the purification of brine solution in caustic chlorine plants and also in the manufacture of heat treatment salts, case hardening of steel. It is also used to make red pigments such as Lithol red and Red Lake C. Its toxicity limits its applicability.

== Toxicity ==
Barium chloride, along with other water-soluble barium salts, is highly toxic. It irritates eyes and skin, causing redness and pain. It damages kidneys. Fatal dose of barium chloride for a human has been reported to be about 0.8-0.9 g. Systemic effects of acute barium chloride toxicity include abdominal pain, diarrhea, nausea, vomiting, cardiac arrhythmia, muscular paralysis, and death. The Ba^{2+} ions compete with the K^{+} ions, causing the muscle fibers to be electrically unexcitable, thus causing weakness and paralysis of the body. Sodium sulfate and magnesium sulfate are potential antidotes because they form barium sulfate BaSO_{4}, which is relatively non-toxic because of its insolubility in water.

Barium chloride is not classified as a human carcinogen.
