= Barium phosphate =

Chemical compound

Names
- IUPAC name Barium phosphate
- Other names Barium orthophosphate

Identifiers
CAS Number	13517-08-3
3D model (JSmol)	Interactive image
ChemSpider	145305
ECHA InfoCard	100.033.491
EC Number	236-856-9
PubChem CID	165803
CompTox Dashboard (EPA)	DTXSID20889612
- InChI: InChI=1S/3Ba.2H3O4P/c;;;2*1-5(2,3)4/h;;;2*(H3,1,2,3,4)/q3*+2;;/p-6 Key: WAKZZMMCDILMEF-UHFFFAOYSA-H
- SMILES: [O-]P(=O)([O-])[O-].[O-]P(=O)([O-])[O-].[Ba+2].[Ba+2].[Ba+2]

Properties
Chemical formula	Ba_{3}(PO_{4})_{2}
Molar mass	601.9 g/mol
Appearance	Powder

Structure
Crystal structure	Rhombohedral
Space group	R3̅m

Hazards
- GHS labelling
Pictograms	(GHS07: Exclamation mark)
Signal word	Warning
Hazard statements	H302, H332
Precautionary statements	P261, P264, P270, P271, P301+P317, P304+P340, P317, P330, P501
- Except where otherwise noted, data are given for materials in their standard state (at 25 °C [77 °F], 100 kPa). Infobox references

Barium phosphate, also known as barium orthophosphate, is an inorganic phosphate of barium with the molecular formula Ba_{3}(PO_{4})_{2}. It is usually found as a white, odorless powder which is insoluble in water.

== Synthesis ==
The general chemical reaction for the synthesis of barium phosphate powder, using the sol-gel process, is:

3 Ba(NO_{3})_{2} + 2 NH_{4}H_{2}PO_{4} → Ba_{3}(PO_{4})_{2} + 2 NH_{4}NO_{3} + 4 HNO_{3}

Barium phosphate is formed as a precipitate.

== Structure ==
Its crystal structure is rhombohedral with a space group of R3̅m, identical to that of strontium phosphate.

== Properties ==
Barium phosphate exhibits properties such as high refractive index, low melting point, low glass transition temperature, high transparency to ultraviolet light, and high thermal expansion coefficient.

== Applications ==
Barium phosphate finds uses in industrial applications, including optical applications like preparation of glasses with special properties for pulsed lasers, and preparation of solders for glass to glass bonding. It can also be used in development of hydrogen / fuel sensors.

== See also ==
- Barium metaphosphate
