= Barium metaphosphate =

Names
- IUPAC name barium(2+); dioxido(oxo)phosphanium

Identifiers
CAS Number	13762-83-9
3D model (JSmol)	Interactive image
ChemSpider	2341276
ECHA InfoCard	100.033.951
EC Number	237-362-6
PubChem CID	3084168
CompTox Dashboard (EPA)	DTXSID30872575
- InChI: InChI=1S/Ba.2HO3P/c;2*1-4(2)3/h;2*(H,1,2,3)/q+2;;/p-2 Key: XNJIKBGDNBEQME-UHFFFAOYSA-L
- SMILES: [O-][P+](=O)[O-].[O-][P+](=O)[O-].[Ba+2]

Properties
Chemical formula	Ba(PO_{3})_{2}
Molar mass	295.27 g/mol
Appearance	Powder
Density	3.63 g/cm^{3}
Melting point	1,560 °C (2,840 °F; 1,830 K)
- Except where otherwise noted, data are given for materials in their standard state (at 25 °C [77 °F], 100 kPa). Infobox references

Barium metaphosphate is an inorganic substance with the molecular formula Ba(PO_{3})_{2}. It is a colourless solid that is insoluble in water, though is soluble in acidic solutions through "slow dissolution". X-ray crystallography shows that this material is composed of Ba^{2+} cations attached to a polyphosphate ((PO_{3}^{−})_{n}) anion. A number of hydrated forms are known which are actually cyclic metaphosphates, Ba_{2}(P_{4}O_{12})·3.5H_{2}O, Ba_{3}(P_{3}O_{9})_{2}·6H_{2}O.

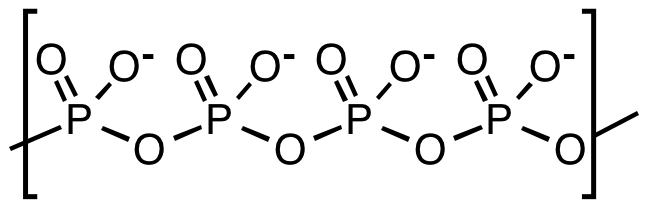
Structure of a subunit of linear polyphosphate anion.

== Preparation ==
Barium metaphosphate can be prepared by the reaction of barium carbonate with metaphosphoric acid:

BaCO_{3} + 2HPO_{3} → Ba(PO_{3})_{2} +CO_{2} +H_{2}O

or alternatively by the aqueous reaction of barium chloride and sodium metaphosphate: BaCl_{2}(aq) + 2NaPO_{3}(aq) → Ba(PO_{3})_{2} + 2NaCl

== Applications ==
The combination of soda and barium polyphosphate forms a low-melting glass with a high coefficient of thermal expansion. The melting point of the glass increases with barium content. This glass makes seals with low melting metals like aluminium (melting point 650 °C). Normal borosilicate glasses soften above the melting point of aluminium. This mixture is prepared by heating a mixture of diammonium phosphate, sodium carbonate, and barium carbonate.
