= Strontium phosphate =

Chemical compound

Identifiers
CAS Number	7446-28-8
3D model (JSmol)	Interactive image
ChemSpider	140450
ECHA InfoCard	100.028.369
EC Number	231-206-0
PubChem CID	159737
UNII	B7CF3BD0TT
CompTox Dashboard (EPA)	DTXSID20889576
- InChI: InChI=1S/2H3O4P.3Sr/c2*1-5(2,3)4;;;/h2*(H3,1,2,3,4);;;/q;;3*+2/p-6 Key: JOPDZQBPOWAEHC-UHFFFAOYSA-H
- SMILES: [O-]P(=O)([O-])[O-].[O-]P(=O)([O-])[O-].[Sr+2].[Sr+2].[Sr+2]

Properties
Chemical formula	Sr_{3}(PO_{4})_{2}
Molar mass	452.8 g/mol
Appearance	White solid
Density	4.53 g/cm^{3}
Melting point	1,620 °C (2,950 °F; 1,890 K)
Solubility in water	Insoluble

Structure
Crystal structure	Rhombohedral
Space group	R3̅m
Lattice constant	a = 5.39 Å, c = 19.78 Å
Lattice volume (V)	497.8 Å^{3}

Related compounds
Other anions	Strontium sulfate
Other cations	Tricalcium phosphate Barium phosphate
- Except where otherwise noted, data are given for materials in their standard state (at 25 °C [77 °F], 100 kPa). Infobox references

Strontium phosphate is the phosphate salt of strontium, with the molecular formula Sr_{3}(PO_{4})_{2}. It is a white solid insoluble in water.

== Preparation and properties ==
Strontium phosphate is commonly produced by the reaction of soluble strontium compounds, such as strontium nitrate, and a phosphate source, such as phosphoric acid or tripotassium phosphate, in water, resulting in a white precipitate of the tetrahydrate:

3 Sr(NO_{3})_{2} + 2 K_{3}PO_{4} + 4 H_{2}O → Sr_{3}(PO_{4})_{2}·4H_{2}O↓ + 6 KNO_{3}

Under water, the tetrahydrate slowly hydrolyses to strontium hydroxyapatite (Sr_{10}(PO_{4})_{6}(OH)_{2}). The tetrahydrate decomposes to the anhydrous form when heated to 900 °C.

The anhydrous form can be produced without the presence of water, to avoid hydrolysis, by the heating of ammonium dihydrogen phosphate and strontium carbonate at 1030 °C and 30 MPa of pressure.
