= Brin process =

Chemical process

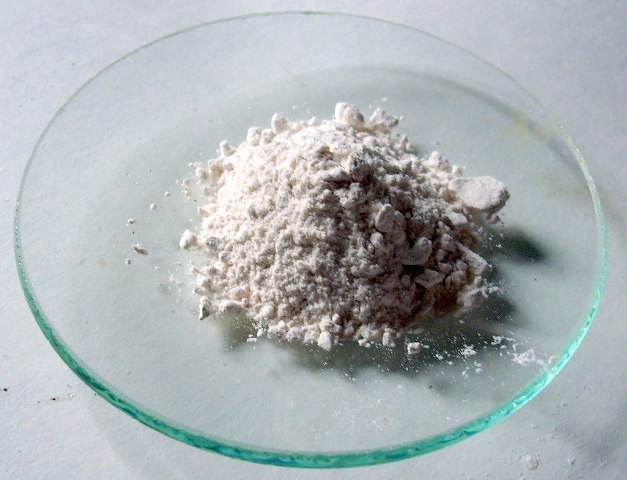
Barium peroxide

Brin process is a now-obsolete industrial scale production process for oxygen. In this process barium oxide reacts at 500–600 °C with air to form barium peroxide which decomposes at above 800 °C by releasing oxygen.

2 BaO + O_{2} ⇌ 2 BaO_{2}

The reaction was discovered by Joseph-Louis Gay-Lussac and Louis-Jacques Thenard in 1811 and Jean-Baptiste Boussingault tried to use this reaction to establish a process to produce oxygen in 1852. The process worked only for a few cycles and then became inefficient. Two students of Boussingault, Quentin and Arthur Leon Brin, discovered that traces of carbon dioxide formed barium carbonate. Removing the carbon dioxide with sodium hydroxide solved this problem. In 1884 they opened a factory producing oxygen by their improved process. In the commercial process, oxygen capture and release was controlled by pressure rather than temperature, with oxygen being captured at high pressure and released at low pressure. This allowed a faster change between the capture and release phases, which would last one to two hours.

The company was first named Brins Oxygen Company after the two brothers. In 1906 it was renamed as the British Oxygen Company.

One major application of the oxygen was the use for limelight. Before the end of the 19th century electrolysis of water and fractional distillation of liquefied air became economically cheaper methods to produce oxygen and the process slowly faded out.
