= Barium chloride (data page) =

Chemical data page

This page provides supplementary chemical data on barium chloride.

== Material Safety Data Sheet ==
- SIRI
- Science Stuff (Dihydrate)

== Thermodynamic properties ==
Phase behavior
Solid properties
Liquid properties
Std enthalpy change of formation, Δ_{f}H^{~~o~~}_{liquid}	−832.47 kJ/mol
Standard molar entropy, S^{~~o~~}_{liquid}	143.52 J/(mol K)
Heat capacity, c_{p}	? J/(mol K)
Gas properties
Std enthalpy change of formation, Δ_{f}H^{~~o~~}_{gas}	−498.73 kJ/mol
Standard molar entropy, S^{~~o~~}_{gas}	325.73 J/(mol K)
Heat capacity, c_{p}	? J/(mol K)

== Spectral data ==
UV-Vis
λ_{max}	? nm
Extinction coefficient, ε	?
IR
Major absorption bands	? cm^{−1}
NMR
Proton NMR
Carbon-13 NMR
Other NMR data
MS
Masses of main fragments
