= Barium peroxide =

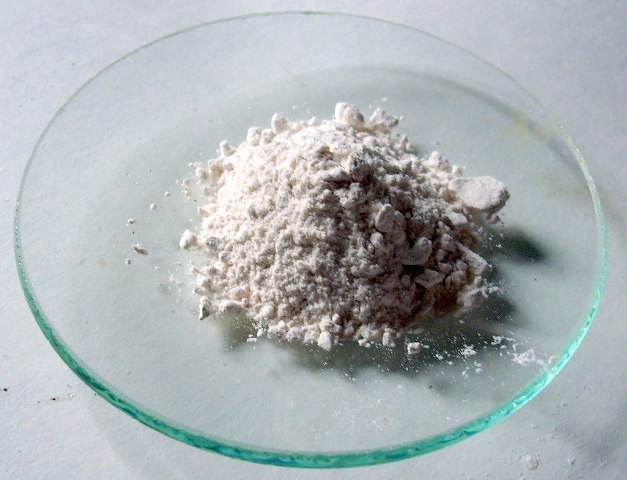

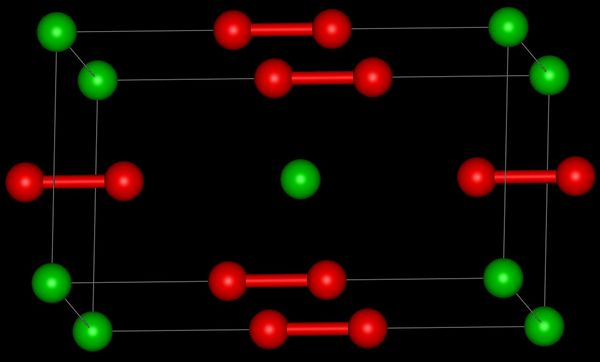
- Barium cations Ba^{2+} Peroxide anions O^{2−}_{2}

Names
- IUPAC name barium peroxide
- Other names Barium binoxide, Barium dioxide

Identifiers
| CAS Number | 1304-29-6 |
| 3D model (JSmol) | Interactive image |
| ChemSpider | 14090 |
| ECHA InfoCard | 100.013.754 |
| EC Number | 215-128-4 |
| PubChem CID | 14773 |
| RTECS number | CR0175000 |
| UNII | T892KY013Y |
| UN number | 1449 |
| CompTox Dashboard (EPA) | DTXSID9051294 |
- InChI: InChI=1S/Ba.O2/c;1-2/q+2;-2 Key: ZJRXSAYFZMGQFP-UHFFFAOYSA-N; InChI=1/Ba.O2/c;1-2/q+2;-2 Key: ZJRXSAYFZMGQFP-UHFFFAOYAZ
- SMILES: [Ba+2].[O-][O-]

Properties
| Chemical formula | BaO_{2} |
| Molar mass | 169.33 g/mol (anhydrous); 313.45 g/mol (octahydrate) |
| Appearance | Grey-white crystalline solid (anhydrous); Colorless solid (octahydrate) |
| Odor | Odorless |
| Density | 5.68 g/cm^{3} (anhydrous); 2.292 g/cm^{3} (octahydrate) |
| Melting point | 450 °C (842 °F; 723 K) |
| Boiling point | 800 °C (1,470 °F; 1,070 K) (decomposes to BaO & O_{2}.) |
| Solubility in water | 0.091 g/100mL (20 °C (68 °F; 293 K)) (anhydrous); 0.168 g/cm^{3} (octahydrate) |
| Solubility | dissolves with decomposition in acid |
| Magnetic susceptibility (χ) | −40.6×10^{−6} cm^{3}/mol |

Structure
| Crystal structure | Tetragonal |
| Space group | D^{17}_{4h}, I4/mmm, tI6 |
| Coordination geometry | 6 |

Hazards
- GHS labelling
| Pictograms | (GHS03: Oxidizing) (GHS07: Exclamation mark) |
| Signal word | Warning |
| Hazard statements | H272, H302, H332 |
| Precautionary statements | P210, P220, P221, P261, P264, P270, P271, P280, P301+P312, P304+P312, P304+P340, P312, P330, P370+P378, P501 |
| NFPA 704 (fire diamond) | 3 0 2 OX |
- Except where otherwise noted, data are given for materials in their standard state (at 25 °C [77 °F], 100 kPa). verify (what is ?) Infobox references

Barium peroxide is an inorganic compound with the formula BaO_{2}. This white solid (gray when impure) is one of the most common inorganic peroxides, and it was the first peroxide compound discovered. Being an oxidizer and giving a vivid green colour upon ignition (as do all barium compounds), it finds some use in fireworks; historically, it was also used as a precursor for hydrogen peroxide.

== Structure ==
Barium peroxide consists of barium cations Ba^{2+} and peroxide anions O^{2−}_{2}. The solid is isomorphous to calcium carbide, CaC_{2}.

== Preparation and use ==
Barium peroxide arises by the reversible reaction of O_{2} with barium oxide. The peroxide forms around 500 °C (932 °F) and oxygen is released above 820 °C (1,510 °F).

2 BaO + O_{2} ⇌ 2 BaO_{2}

This reaction is the basis for the now-obsolete Brin process for separating oxygen from the atmosphere. Other oxides, e.g. Na_{2}O and SrO, behave similarly.

In another obsolete application, barium peroxide was once used to produce hydrogen peroxide via its reaction with sulfuric acid:

BaO_{2} + H_{2}SO_{4} → H_{2}O_{2} + BaSO_{4}

The insoluble barium sulfate is filtered from the mixture.

== See also ==
- Barium oxide
