= Barium =

Barium, _{56}Ba

Barium
- Pronunciation: /ˈbɛəriəm/ (BAIR-ee-əm)
- Appearance: silvery gray; with a pale yellow tint

Standard atomic weight A_{r}°(Ba)
- 137.327±0.007; 137.33±0.01 (abridged)

Barium in the periodic table
Hydrogen																															Helium
Lithium	Beryllium																									Boron	Carbon	Nitrogen	Oxygen	Fluorine	Neon
Sodium	Magnesium																									Aluminium	Silicon	Phosphorus	Sulfur	Chlorine	Argon
Potassium	Calcium															Scandium	Titanium	Vanadium	Chromium	Manganese	Iron	Cobalt	Nickel	Copper	Zinc	Gallium	Germanium	Arsenic	Selenium	Bromine	Krypton
Rubidium	Strontium															Yttrium	Zirconium	Niobium	Molybdenum	Technetium	Ruthenium	Rhodium	Palladium	Silver	Cadmium	Indium	Tin	Antimony	Tellurium	Iodine	Xenon
Caesium	Barium	Lanthanum	Cerium	Praseodymium	Neodymium	Promethium	Samarium	Europium	Gadolinium	Terbium	Dysprosium	Holmium	Erbium	Thulium	Ytterbium	Lutetium	Hafnium	Tantalum	Tungsten	Rhenium	Osmium	Iridium	Platinum	Gold	Mercury (element)	Thallium	Lead	Bismuth	Polonium	Astatine	Radon
Francium	Radium	Actinium	Thorium	Protactinium	Uranium	Neptunium	Plutonium	Americium	Curium	Berkelium	Californium	Einsteinium	Fermium	Mendelevium	Nobelium	Lawrencium	Rutherfordium	Dubnium	Seaborgium	Bohrium	Hassium	Meitnerium	Darmstadtium	Roentgenium	Copernicium	Nihonium	Flerovium	Moscovium	Livermorium	Tennessine	Oganesson
Sr
↑
Ba
↓
Ra
caesium ← barium → lanthanum
- Atomic number (Z): 56
- Group: group 2 (alkaline earth metals)
- Period: period 6
- Block: s-block
- Electron configuration: [Xe] 6s^{2}
- Electrons per shell: 2, 8, 18, 18, 8, 2

Physical properties
- Phase at STP: solid
- Melting point: 1000 K (727 °C, 1341 °F)
- Boiling point: 2118 K (1845 °C, 3353 °F)
- Density (at 20° C): 3.594 g/cm^{3}
- when liquid (at m.p.): 3.338 g/cm^{3}
- Heat of fusion: 7.12 kJ/mol
- Heat of vaporization: 142 kJ/mol
- Molar heat capacity: 28.07 J/(mol·K)
- Specific heat capacity: 204.398 J/(kg·K)
Vapor pressure
P (Pa)	1	10	100	1 k	10 k	100 k
at T (K)	911	1038	1185	1388	1686	2170

Atomic properties
- Oxidation states: common: +2 +1
- Electronegativity: Pauling scale: 0.89
- Ionization energies: 1st: 502.9 kJ/mol; 2nd: 965.2 kJ/mol; 3rd: 3600 kJ/mol
- Atomic radius: empirical: 222 pm
- Covalent radius: 215±11 pm
- Van der Waals radius: 268 pm
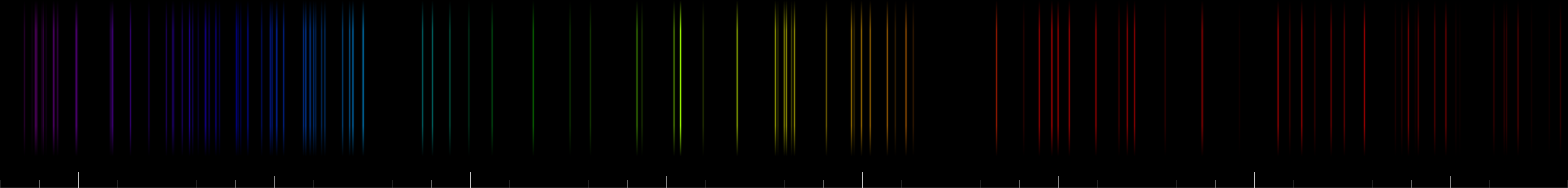
- Spectral lines of barium

Other properties
- Natural occurrence: primordial
- Crystal structure: body-centered cubic (bcc) (cI2)
- Lattice constant: a = 502.5 pm (at 20 °C)
- Thermal expansion: 20.47×10^{−6}/K (at 20 °C)
- Thermal conductivity: 18.4 W/(m⋅K)
- Electrical resistivity: 332 nΩ⋅m (at 20 °C)
- Magnetic ordering: paramagnetic
- Molar magnetic susceptibility: +20.6×10^{−6} cm^{3}/mol
- Young's modulus: 13 GPa
- Shear modulus: 4.9 GPa
- Bulk modulus: 9.6 GPa
- Speed of sound thin rod: 1620 m/s (at 20 °C)
- Mohs hardness: 1.25
- CAS Number: 7440-39-3

History
- Naming: from Greek βαρὺς (barys), meaning 'heavy'
- Discovery: Carl Wilhelm Scheele (1772)
- First isolation: Humphry Davy (1808)

Isotopes of barium
Main isotopes			Decay	
Isotope	abundance	half-life (t_{1/2})	mode	product
^{130}Ba	0.11%	(0.5–2.7)×10^{21} y	εε	^{130}Xe
^{131}Ba	synth	11.52 d	β^{+}	^{131}Cs
^{132}Ba	0.10%	stable		
^{133}Ba	synth	10.538 y	ε	^{133}Cs
^{134}Ba	2.42%	stable		
^{135}Ba	6.59%	stable		
^{136}Ba	7.85%	stable		
^{137}Ba	11.23%	stable		
^{138}Ba	71.70%	stable		
^{140}Ba	synth	12.753 d	β^{−}	^{140}La

Barium is a chemical element; it has symbol Ba and atomic number 56. It is the fifth element in group 2 and is a soft, silvery alkaline earth metal. Because of its high chemical reactivity, barium is never found in nature as a free element.

The most common minerals of barium are barite (barium sulfate, BaSO_{4}) and witherite (barium carbonate, BaCO_{3}). The name barium originates from the alchemical derivative "baryta" from Greek βαρὺς (barys), meaning 'heavy'. Baric is the adjectival form of barium. Barium was identified as a new element in 1772, but not reduced to a metal until 1808 with the advent of electrolysis.

Barium has few industrial applications. Historically, it was used as a getter for vacuum tubes and in oxide form as the emissive coating on indirectly heated cathodes. It is a component of YBCO (high-temperature superconductors) and electroceramics, and is added to steel and cast iron to reduce the size of carbon grains within the microstructure. Barium compounds are added to fireworks to impart a green color. Barium sulfate is used as an insoluble additive to oil well drilling fluid. In a purer form it is used as X-ray radiocontrast agents for imaging the human gastrointestinal tract. Water-soluble barium compounds are poisonous and have been used as rodenticides.

== Characteristics ==
=== Physical properties ===
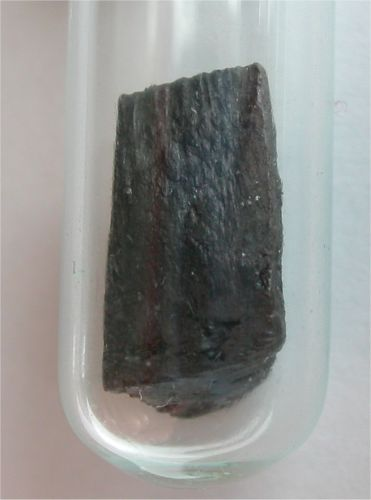
Oxidized barium

Barium is a soft, silvery-white metal, with a slight golden shade when ultrapure. The silvery-white color of barium metal rapidly vanishes upon oxidation in air yielding a dark gray layer containing the oxide. Barium has a medium specific weight and high electrical conductivity. Because barium is difficult to purify, many of its properties have not been accurately determined.

At room temperature and pressure, barium metal adopts a body-centered cubic structure, with a barium–barium distance of 503 picometers, expanding with heating at a rate of approximately 1.8×10^{−5}/°C. It is a soft metal with a Mohs hardness of 1.25. Its melting temperature of 1,000 K (730 °C; 1,340 °F) is intermediate between those of the lighter strontium (1,050 K or 780 °C or 1,430 °F) and heavier radium (973 K or 700 °C or 1,292 °F); however, its boiling point of 2,170 K (1,900 °C; 3,450 °F) exceeds that of strontium (1,655 K or 1,382 °C or 2,519 °F). The density (3.62 g/cm^{3}) is again intermediate between those of strontium (2.36 g/cm^{3}) and radium (≈5 g/cm^{3}).

=== Chemical reactivity ===
Barium is chemically similar to magnesium, calcium, and strontium, but more reactive. Its compounds are almost invariably found in the +2 oxidation state. As expected for a highly electropositive metal, barium's reaction with chalcogens is highly exothermic (release energy). Barium reacts with atmospheric oxygen in air at room temperature. For this reason, metallic barium is often stored under oil or in an inert atmosphere. Reactions with other nonmetals, such as carbon, nitrogen, phosphorus, silicon, and hydrogen, proceed upon heating. Reactions with water and alcohols are also exothermic and release hydrogen gas:

Ba + 2 ROH → Ba(OR)_{2} + H_{2}↑ (R is an alkyl group or a hydrogen atom)

Barium reacts with ammonia to form the electride [Ba(NH_{3})_{6}](e^{−})_{2}, which near room temperature gives the amide Ba(NH_{2})_{2}.

The metal is readily attacked by acids. Sulfuric acid is a notable exception because passivation stops the reaction by forming the insoluble barium sulfate on the surface. Barium combines with several other metals, including aluminium, zinc, lead, and tin, forming intermetallic phases and alloys.

=== Compounds ===
Selected alkaline earth and zinc salts densities, g/cm^{3}
	O^{2−}	S^{2−}	F^{−}	Cl^{−}	SO^{2−}_{4}	CO^{2−}_{3}	O^{2−}_{2}	H^{−}
Ca^{2+}	3.34	2.59	3.18	2.15	2.96	2.83	2.9	1.7
Sr^{2+}	5.1	3.7	4.24	3.05	3.96	3.5	4.78	3.26
Ba^{2+}	5.72	4.3	4.89	3.89	4.49	4.29	4.96	4.16
Zn^{2+}	5.6	4.09	4.95	2.91	3.54	4.4	1.57	—

Barium salts are typically white when solid and colorless when dissolved. They are denser than the strontium or calcium analogs (see table; zinc is given for comparison).

Barium hydroxide ("baryta") was known to alchemists, who produced it by heating barium carbonate. Unlike calcium hydroxide, it absorbs very little CO_{2} in aqueous solutions and is therefore insensitive to atmospheric fluctuations. This property is used in calibrating pH equipment.

Barium compounds burn with a green to pale green flame, which is an efficient test to detect a barium compound. The color results from spectral lines at 455.4, 493.4, 553.6, and 611.1 nm.

=== Isotopes ===
All nuclear data not otherwise stated is from the standard source:

Barium found in the Earth's crust is a mixture of seven primordial nuclides, barium-130, 132, and 134 through 138. Barium-130 undergoes very slow radioactive decay to xenon-130 by double beta plus decay, with a half-life of (0.5–2.7)×10^{21} years (about 10^{11} times the age of the universe). Its abundance is about 0.11% that of natural barium. Though barium-132 can theoretically undergo the same decay, giving xenon-132, experimental evidence has not detected this.

Of the stable isotopes, barium-138 composes 71.7% of all barium; other isotopes have decreasing abundance with decreasing mass number (except for a probable inversion for the p-nuclei ^{130}Ba and ^{132}Ba).

In total, barium has 41 known isotopes, ranging in mass between 114 and 154. The most stable artificial radioisotope is barium-133 with a half-life of 10.538 years. Five other isotopes have half-lives longer than a day. The longest-lived isomers are ^{133m}Ba at 38.90 hours and ^{135m1}Ba at 28.11 hours. The analogous ^{137m1}Ba (half-life 2.552 minutes) occurs in the decay of the common fission product caesium-137.

== History ==
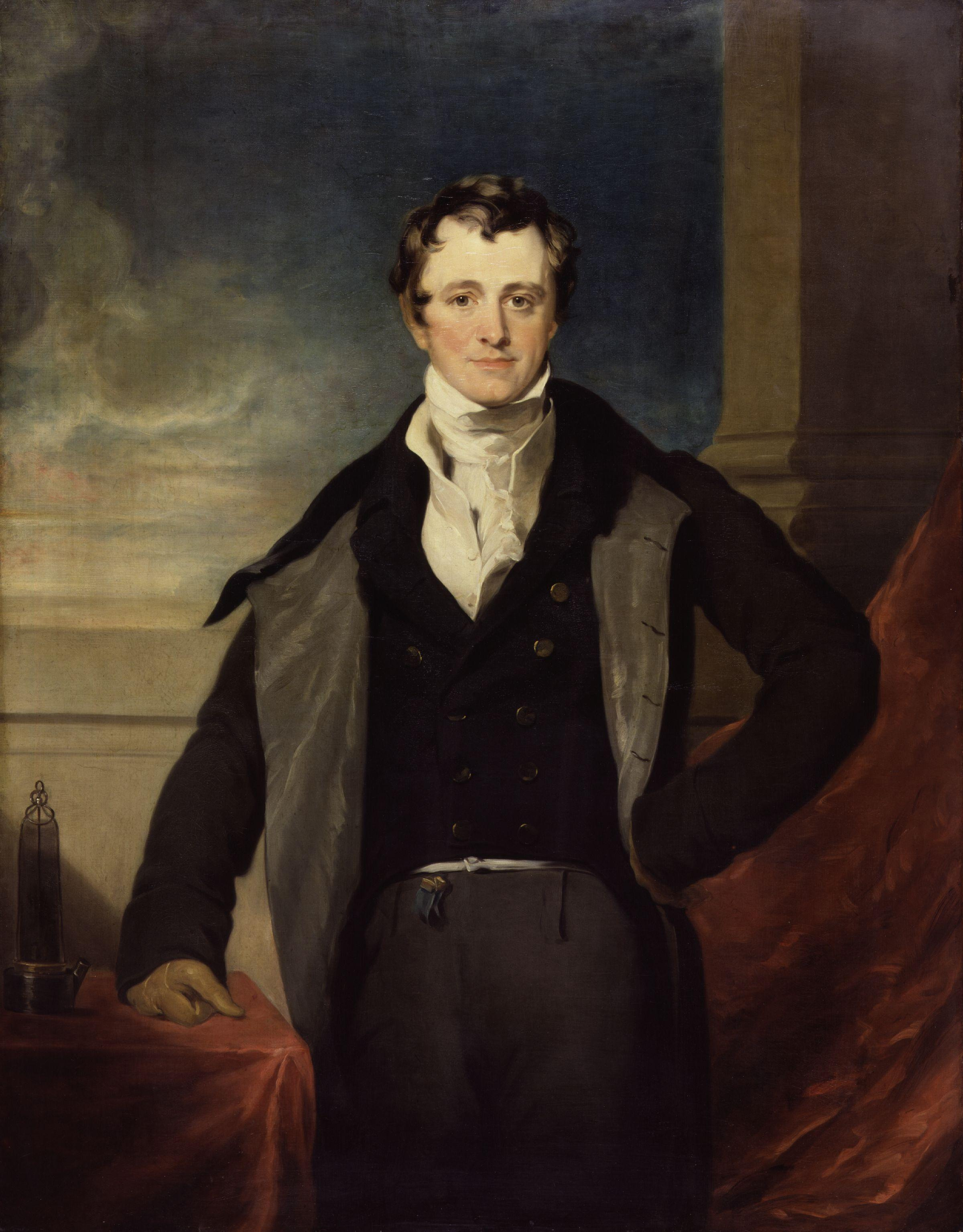
Portrait of Sir Humphry Davy by Thomas Lawrence, 1821. Sir Humphry Davy was the first to isolate barium metal.

Alchemists in the early Middle Ages knew about some barium minerals. Smooth pebble-like stones of mineral baryte were found in volcanic rock near Bologna, Italy, and so were called "Bologna stones". Alchemists were attracted to them because after exposure to light they would glow for years. The phosphorescent properties of baryte heated with organics were described by V. Casciorolus in 1602.

Carl Scheele determined that baryte contained a new element in 1772, but could not isolate barium, only barium oxide. Johan Gottlieb Gahn also isolated barium oxide two years later in similar studies. Oxidized barium was at first called "barote" by Guyton de Morveau, a name that was changed by Antoine Lavoisier to baryte (in French) or baryta (in Latin). Also in the 18th century, English mineralogist William Withering noted a heavy mineral in the lead mines of Cumberland, now known to be witherite. Barium was first isolated by electrolysis of molten barium salts in 1808 by Sir Humphry Davy in England. Davy, by analogy with calcium, named "barium" after baryta, with the "-ium" ending signifying a metallic element. Robert Bunsen and Augustus Matthiessen obtained pure barium by electrolysis of a molten mixture of barium chloride and ammonium chloride.

The production of pure oxygen in the Brin process was a large-scale application of barium peroxide in the 1880s, before it was replaced by electrolysis and fractional distillation of liquefied air in the early 1900s. In this process barium oxide reacts at 500–600 °C (932–1,112 °F) with air to form barium peroxide, which decomposes above 700 °C (1,292 °F) by releasing oxygen:

2 BaO + O_{2} ⇌ 2 BaO_{2}

Barium sulfate was first applied as a radiocontrast agent in X-ray imaging of the digestive system in 1908.

== Occurrence and production ==
The abundance of barium is 0.0425% in the Earth's crust and 13 μg/L in sea water. The primary commercial source of barium is baryte (also called barytes or heavy spar), a barium sulfate mineral. with deposits in many parts of the world. Another commercial source, far less important than baryte, is witherite, barium carbonate. The main deposits are located in Britain, Romania, and the former USSR.

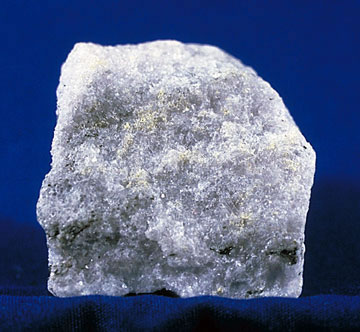
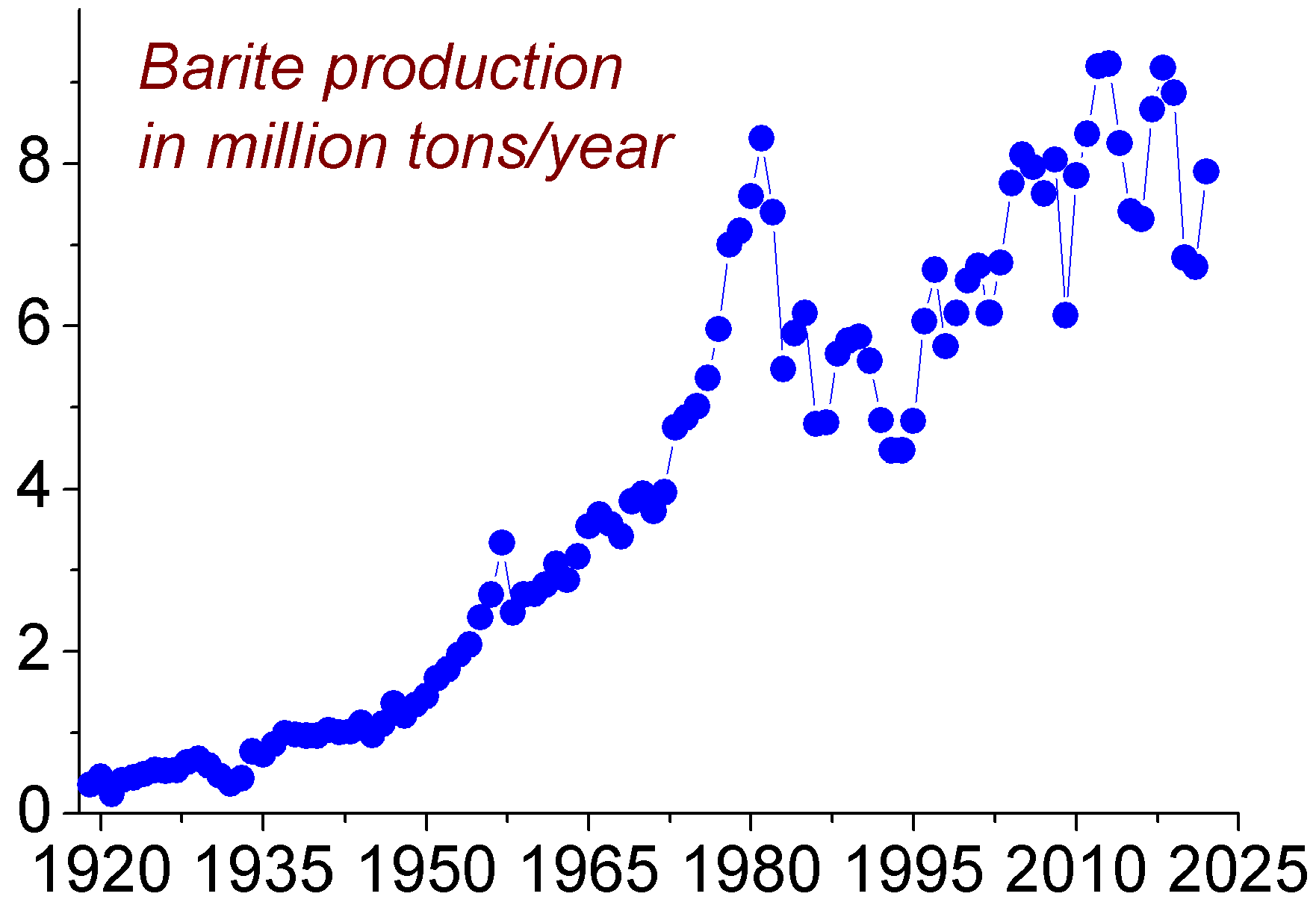
Barite, left to right: appearance, graph showing trends in production over time, and the map showing shares of the most important producer countries in 2010.

The baryte reserves are estimated between 0.7 and 2 billion tonnes. The highest production, 8.3 million tonnes, was achieved in 1981, but only 7–8% was used for barium metal or compounds. Baryte production has risen since the second half of the 1990s from 5.6 million tonnes in 1996 to 7.6 in 2005 and 7.8 in 2011. China accounts for more than 50% of this output, followed by India (14% in 2011), Morocco (8.3%), US (8.2%), Iran and Kazakhstan (2.6% each) and Turkey (2.5%).

The mined ore is washed, crushed, classified, and separated from quartz. If the quartz penetrates too deeply into the ore, or the iron, zinc, or lead content is abnormally high, then froth flotation is used. The product is a 98% pure baryte (by mass); the purity should be no less than 95%, with a minimal content of iron and silicon dioxide. It is then reduced by carbon to barium sulfide:

BaSO_{4} + 2 C → BaS + 2 CO_{2}

The water-soluble barium sulfide is the starting point for other compounds: treating BaS with oxygen produces the sulfate, with nitric acid the nitrate, with aqueous carbon dioxide the carbonate, and so on. The nitrate can be thermally decomposed to yield the oxide. Barium metal is produced by reduction with aluminium at 1,100 °C (2,010 °F). The intermetallic compound BaAl_{4} is produced first:

3 BaO + 14 Al → 3 BaAl_{4} + Al_{2}O_{3}

The remaining barium oxide reacts with the aluminium oxide formed...

BaO + Al_{2}O_{3} → BaAl_{2}O_{4}

...and the overall reaction is:

4 BaO + 2 Al → 3 Ba↓ + BaAl_{2}O_{4}

Note that not all barium is reduced.

Barium vapor is condensed and packed into molds in an atmosphere of argon. This method is used commercially, yielding ultrapure barium. Commonly sold barium is about 99% pure, with main impurities being strontium and calcium (up to 0.8% and 0.25%) and other contaminants contributing less than 0.1%.

A similar reaction with silicon at 1,200 °C (2,190 °F) yields barium and barium metasilicate. Electrolysis is not used because barium readily dissolves in molten halides and the product is rather impure.

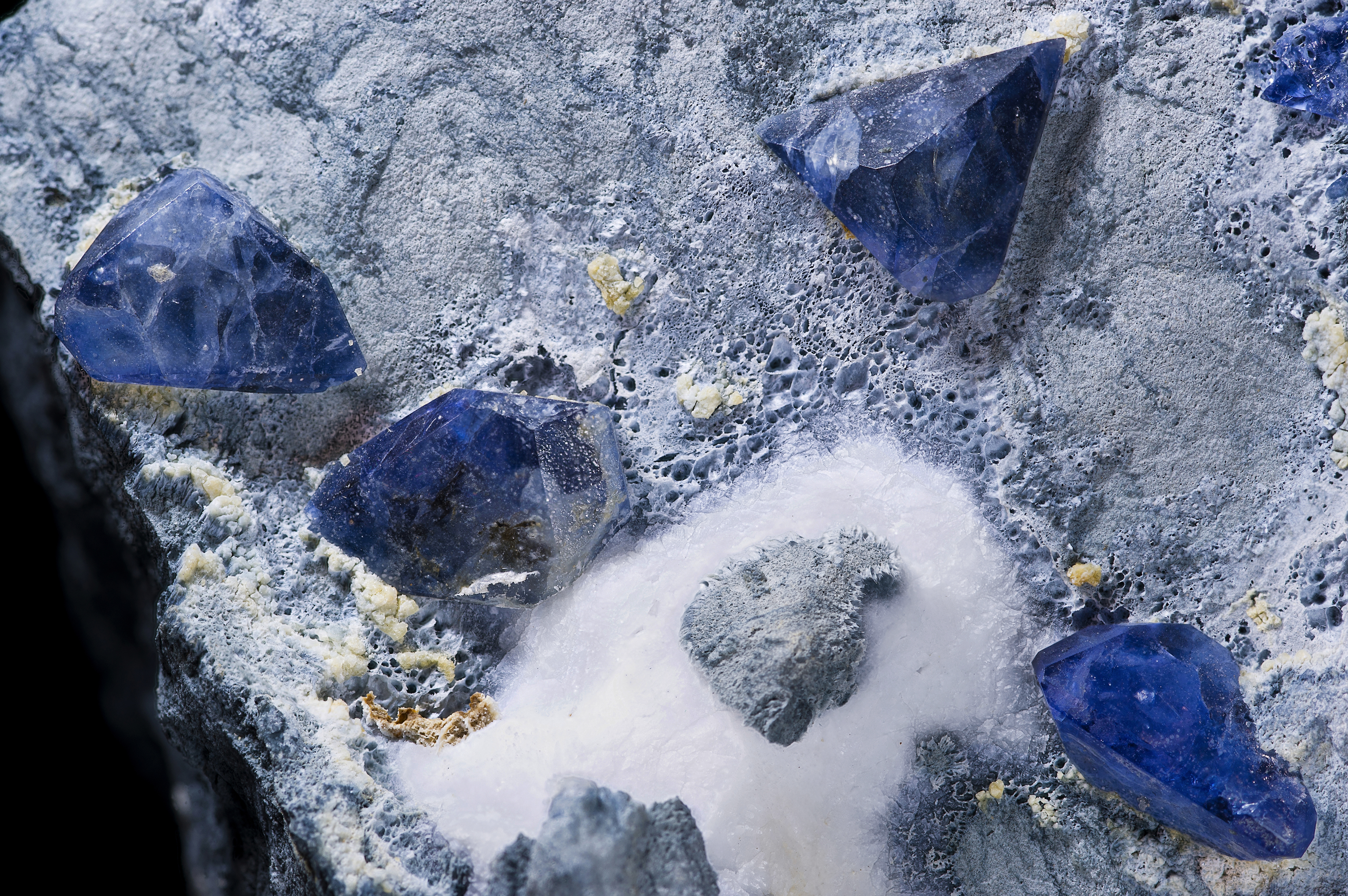
Benitoite crystals on natrolite. The mineral is named for the San Benito River in San Benito County where it was first found.

=== Gemstone ===
The barium mineral, benitoite (barium titanium silicate), occurs as a very rare blue fluorescent gemstone, and is the official state gem of California.

=== Barium in seawater ===
Barium exists in seawater as the Ba^{2+} ion with an average oceanic concentration of 109 nmol/kg. Barium also exists in the ocean as BaSO_{4}, or barite. Barium has a nutrient-like profile with a residence time of 10,000 years.

Barium shows a relatively consistent concentration in upper ocean seawater, excepting regions of high river inputs and regions with strong upwelling. There is little depletion of barium concentrations in the upper ocean for an ion with a nutrient-like profile, thus lateral mixing is important. Barium isotopic values show basin-scale balances instead of local or short-term processes.

== Applications ==
=== Metal and alloys ===
Barium, as a metal or when alloyed with aluminium, is used to remove unwanted gases (gettering) from vacuum tubes, such as TV picture tubes. Barium is suitable for this purpose because of its low vapor pressure and reactivity towards oxygen, nitrogen, carbon dioxide, and water; it can even partly remove noble gases by dissolving them in the crystal lattice. This application has gradually disappeared due to the popularity of the tubeless LCD, LED, and plasma sets.

Other uses of elemental barium are minor and include an additive to silumin (aluminium–silicon alloys) that refines their structure, as well as

- bearing alloys;
- lead–tin soldering alloys – to increase the creep resistance;
- alloy with nickel for spark plugs;
- additive to steel and cast iron as an inoculant;
- alloys with calcium, manganese, silicon, and aluminium as high-grade steel deoxidizers.

=== Barium sulfate and baryte ===
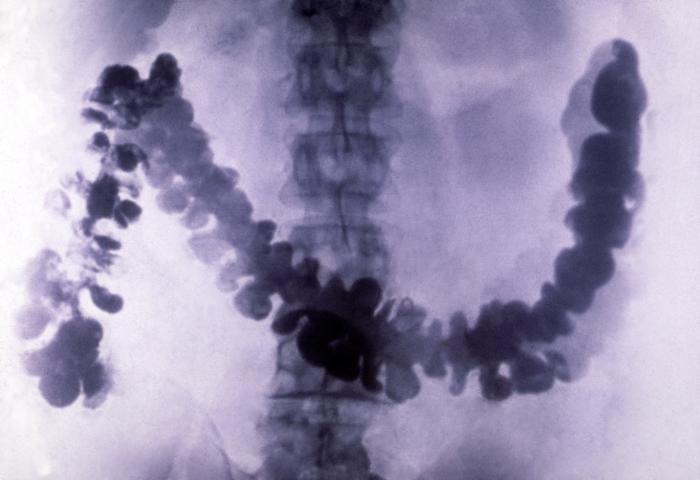
Amoebiasis as seen in a radiograph of a barium-filled colon

Barium sulfate (the mineral baryte, BaSO_{4}) is important to the petroleum industry as a drilling fluid in oil and gas wells. The precipitate of the compound (called "blanc fixe", from the French for "permanent white") is used in paints and varnishes; as a filler in ringing ink, plastics, and rubbers; as a paper coating pigment; and in nanoparticles, to improve physical properties of some polymers, such as epoxies.

Barium sulfate has a low toxicity and relatively high density of ca. 4.5 g/cm^{3} (and thus opacity to X-rays). For this reason it is used as a radiocontrast agent in X-ray imaging of the digestive system ("barium meals" and "barium enemas"). Lithopone, a pigment that contains barium sulfate and zinc sulfide, is a permanent white with good covering power that does not darken when exposed to sulfides.

=== Other barium compounds ===
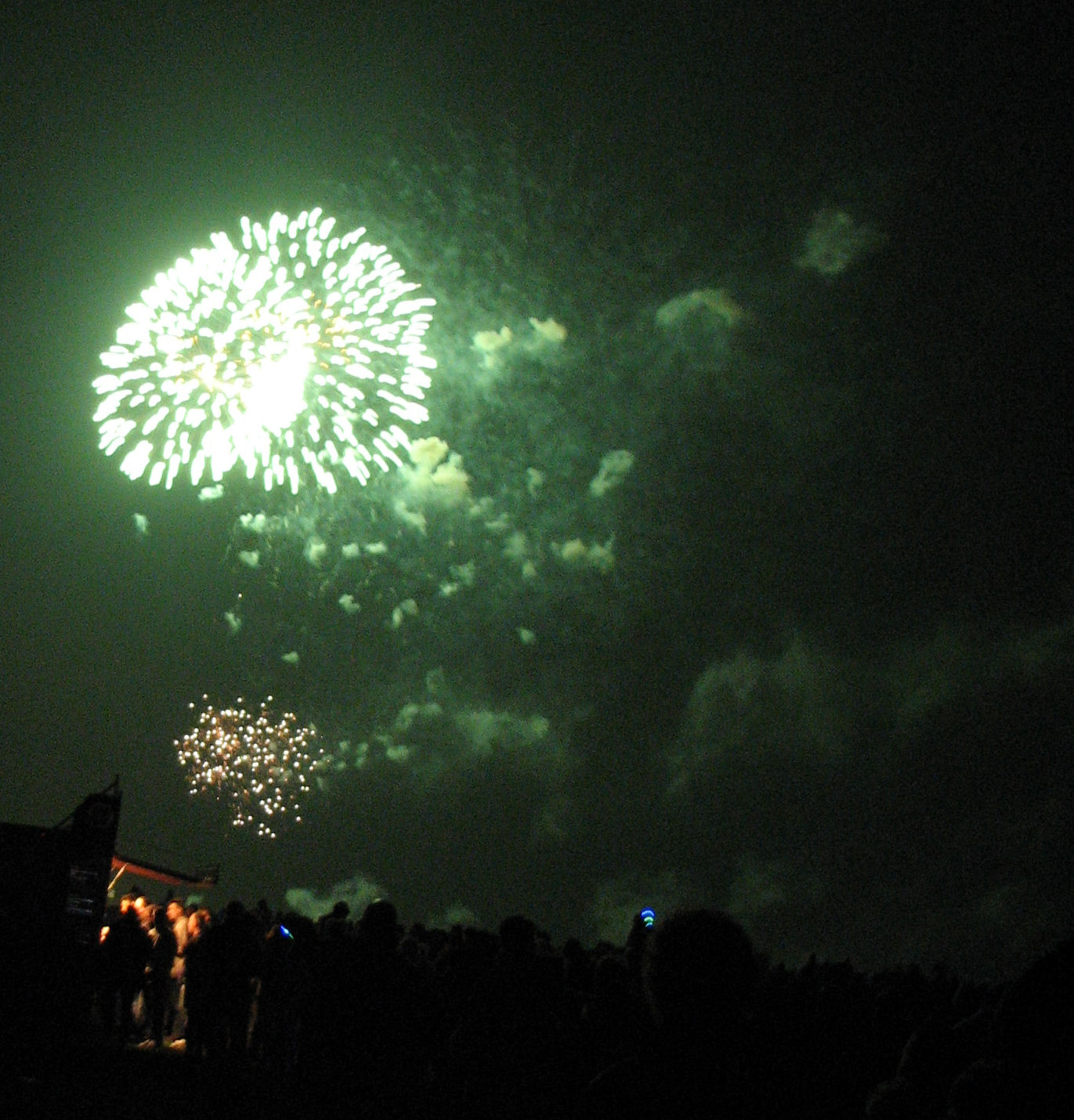
Green barium fireworks

Other compounds of barium find only niche applications, limited by the toxicity of Ba^{2+} ions, which is not a problem for the insoluble BaSO_{4}.

- Barium oxide coating on the electrodes of fluorescent lamps facilitates the release of electrons.
- By its great atomic density, barium carbonate increases the refractive index and luster of glass and reduces leaks of X-rays from CRT screens.
- Barium, usually in the form of barium nitrate, gives fireworks a yellow or "apple" green color if no chlorine donors are present. Adding a chlorine donor produces the brighter emerald greens. Barium chlorate is especially useful for this because it serves as both the oxidizer and the chlorine donor. The bright green light actually comes from the diatomic barium chloride (BaCl) molecule, which forms in situ within the flame.
- Barium peroxide is a catalyst in the aluminothermic reaction (thermite) for welding rail tracks. It is also a green flare in tracer ammunition and a bleaching agent.
- Barium titanate is a promising electroceramic.
- Barium fluoride is used for optics in infrared applications because of its wide transparency range of 0.15–12 micrometers.
- YBCO was the first high-temperature superconductor cooled by liquid nitrogen, with a transition temperature of 93 K (−180.2 °C; −292.3 °F) greater than the boiling point of nitrogen (77 K or −196.2 °C or −321.1 °F).
- Ferrite, a type of sintered ceramic composed of iron oxide (Fe_{2}O_{3}) and barium oxide (BaO), is both electrically nonconductive and ferrimagnetic, and can be temporarily or permanently magnetized.

=== Palaeoceanography ===
The lateral mixing of barium is caused by water mass mixing and ocean circulation. Global ocean circulation reveals a strong correlation between dissolved barium and silicic acid. The large-scale ocean circulation combined with remineralization of barium show a similar correlation between dissolved barium and ocean alkalinity.

Dissolved barium's correlation with silicic acid can be seen both vertically and spatially. Particulate barium shows a strong correlation with particulate organic carbon or POC. Barium is becoming more popular as a base for palaeoceanographic proxies. With both dissolved and particulate barium's links with silicic acid and POC, it can be used to determine historical variations in the biological pump, carbon cycle, and global climate.

The barium particulate barite (BaSO_{4}), as one of many proxies, can be used to provide a host of historical information on processes in different oceanic settings (water column, sediments, and hydrothermal sites). In each setting there are differences in isotopic and elemental composition of the barite particulate. Barite in the water column, known as marine or pelagic barite, reveals information on seawater chemistry variation over time. Barite in sediments, known as diagenetic or cold seeps barite, gives information about sedimentary redox processes. Barite formed via hydrothermal activity at hydrothermal vents, known as hydrothermal barite, reveals alterations in the condition of the earth's crust around those vents.

== Toxicity ==
Barium
Hazards
- GHS labelling
Pictograms	(GHS02: Flammable) (GHS05: Corrosive) (GHS06: Toxic)
Signal word	Danger
Hazard statements	H228, H260, H301, H314
Precautionary statements	P210, P231+P232, P260, P280, P303+P361+P353, P304+P340+P310, P305+P351+P338
NFPA 704 (fire diamond)	3 3 1 W

Soluble barium compounds have an LD_{50} near 10 mg/kg (oral, rats). Symptoms include "convulsions... paralysis of the peripheral nerve system ... severe inflammation of the gastrointestinal tract". Barium blocks the potassium-conducting pore in muscle cells. The insoluble sulfate is nontoxic and is not classified as a dangerous goods in transport regulations.

Little is known about the long term effects of barium exposure. The US EPA considers it unlikely that barium is carcinogenic when consumed orally. Inhaled dust containing insoluble barium compounds can accumulate in the lungs, causing a benign condition called baritosis.

Barium carbonate has been used as a rodenticide. Though considered obsolete, it may still be in use in some countries.

== See also ==
- Han purple and Han blue – synthetic barium copper silicate pigments developed and used in ancient and imperial China
