= Barium oxide =

Chemical compound used in cathode-ray tubes

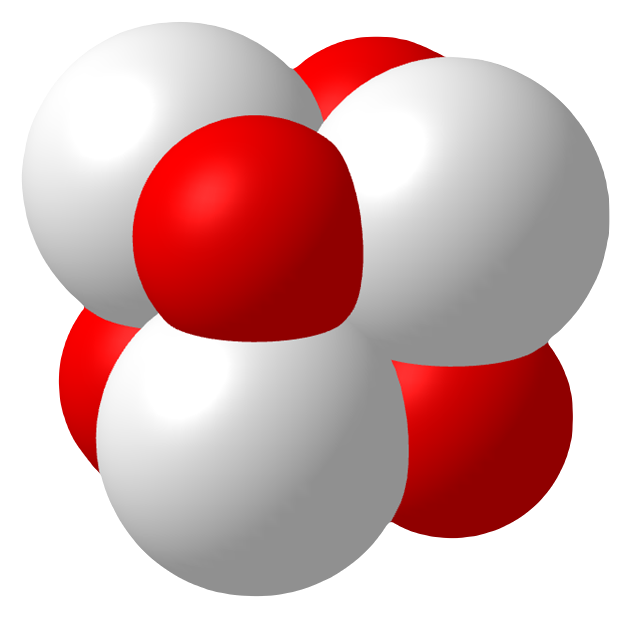

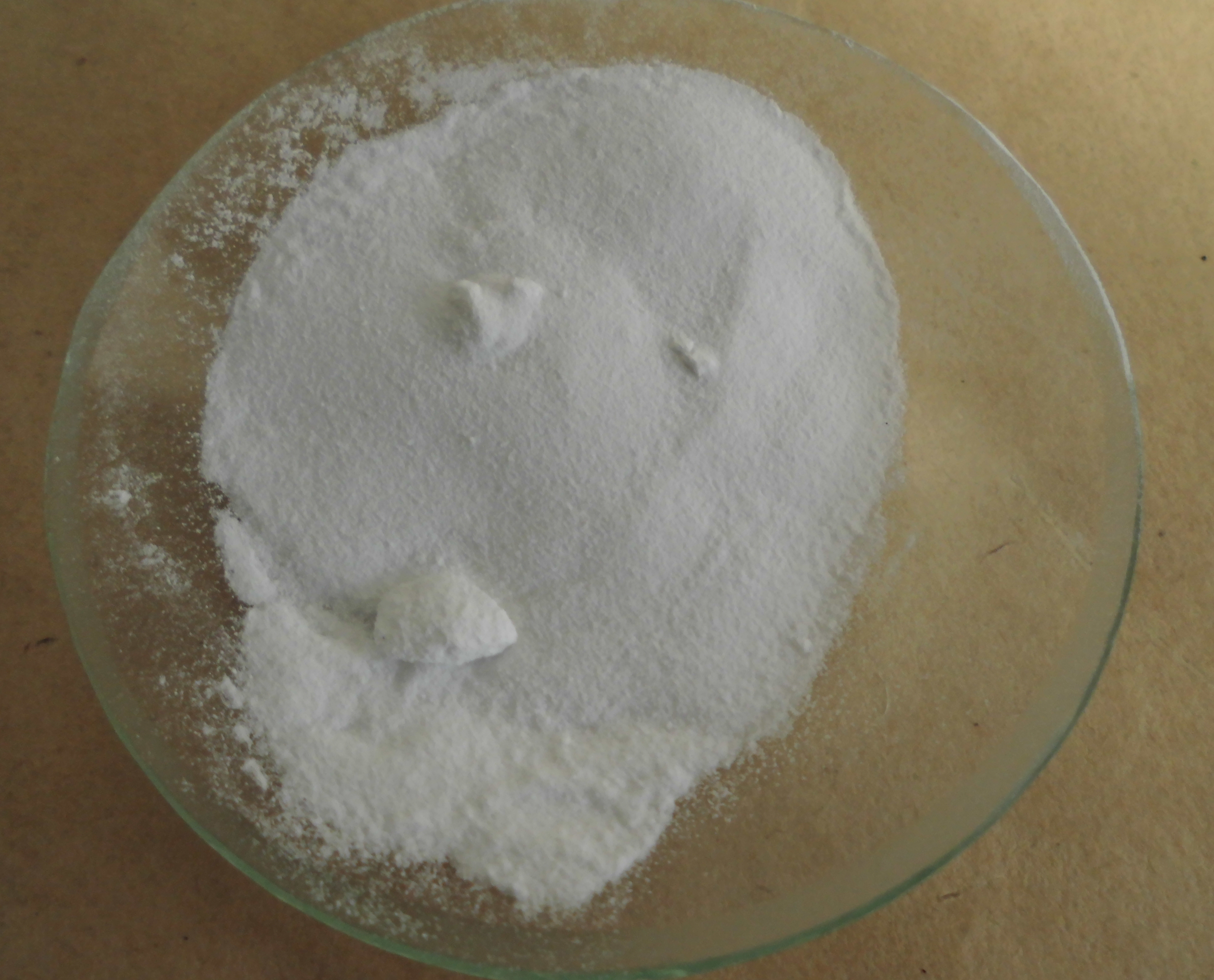

Names
- Other names: Neutral barium oxide (1:1); Barium protoxide; Calcined baryta; Baria

Identifiers
CAS Number	1304-28-5
3D model (JSmol)	Interactive image
ChemSpider	56180
ECHA InfoCard	100.013.753
EC Number	215-127-9
PubChem CID	62392
RTECS number	CQ9800000
UNII	77603K202B
UN number	1884
CompTox Dashboard (EPA)	DTXSID20893234
- InChI: InChI=1S/Ba.O Key: QVQLCTNNEUAWMS-UHFFFAOYSA-N; InChI=1/Ba.O/rBaO/c1-2 Key: QVQLCTNNEUAWMS-FXUTYLCTAB
- SMILES: [Ba]=O

Properties
Chemical formula	BaO
Molar mass	153.326 g/mol
Appearance	white solid
Density	5.72 g/cm^{3}, solid
Melting point	1,923 °C (3,493 °F; 2,196 K)
Boiling point	~ 2,000 °C (3,630 °F; 2,270 K)
Solubility in water	3.48 g/100 mL (20 °C); 90.8 g/100 mL (100 °C); Reacts to form Ba(OH)_{2}
Solubility	soluble in ethanol, dilute mineral acids and alkalies; insoluble in acetone and liquid ammonia
Magnetic susceptibility (χ)	−29.1·10^{−6} cm^{3}/mol

Structure
Crystal structure	cubic, cF8
Space group	Fm3̅m, No. 225
Coordination geometry	Octahedral

Thermochemistry
Heat capacity (C)	47.7 J/K mol
Std molar entropy (S^{⦵}_{298})	70 J·mol^{−1}·K^{−1}
Std enthalpy of formation (Δ_{f}H^{⦵}_{298})	−582 kJ·mol^{−1}

Hazards
- GHS labelling
Pictograms	(GHS05: Corrosive) (GHS06: Toxic) (GHS07: Exclamation mark)
Signal word	Danger
Hazard statements	H301, H302, H314, H315, H332, H412
Precautionary statements	P210, P220, P221, P260, P264, P270, P271, P273, P280, P283, P301+P310, P301+P312, P301+P330+P331, P302+P352, P303+P361+P353, P304+P312, P304+P340, P305+P351+P338, P306+P360, P310, P312, P321, P330, P332+P313, P362, P363, P370+P378, P371+P380+P375, P405, P501
NFPA 704 (fire diamond)	3 0 0
Flash point	Non-flammable

Related compounds
Other anions	Barium hydroxide; Barium peroxide
Other cations	Beryllium oxide; Magnesium oxide; Calcium oxide; Strontium oxide

Supplementary data page
- Barium oxide (data page)
- Except where otherwise noted, data are given for materials in their standard state (at 25 °C [77 °F], 100 kPa). verify (what is ?) Infobox references

Barium oxide, also known as baria, is a white hygroscopic non-flammable compound with the formula BaO. It has a cubic structure and is used in cathode-ray tubes, crown glass, and catalysts. It is harmful to human skin and if swallowed in large quantity causes irritation. Excessive quantities of barium oxide may lead to death.

It is prepared by heating barium carbonate with coke, carbon black or tar or by thermal decomposition of barium nitrate.

== Uses ==
Barium oxide is used as a coating for hot cathodes, for example, those in cathode-ray tubes. It replaced lead(II) oxide in the production of certain kinds of glass such as optical crown glass. While lead oxide raised the refractive index, it also raised the dispersive power, which barium oxide does not alter. Barium oxide also has use as an ethoxylation catalyst in the reaction of ethylene oxide and alcohols, which takes place between 150 and 200 °C.

It is most known for its use in the Brin process, named after its inventors, a reaction that was used as a large scale method to produce oxygen before air separation became the dominant method in the beginning of the 20th century, as BaO can be a source of pure oxygen through heat fluctuation.

BaO(s) + ½O_{2}(g) ⇌ BaO_{2}(s)

It oxidises to BaO_{2} by formation of a peroxide ion ([O−O]^{2−}, or O^{2−}_{2}) — with the same charge of O^{2−}, and therefore keeping the electrochemical balance with the most stable Ba^{2+}. Using the Kröger-Vink notation,

½O_{2}(g) + O^{2–}_{O} ⇌ [O_{2}]^{2–}_{O}

where J_{O} is the species J in the oxygen position within the rock-salt lattice. The complete peroxidation of BaO to BaO_{2} occurs at moderate temperatures by oxygen uptake within the BaO rock-salt lattice:

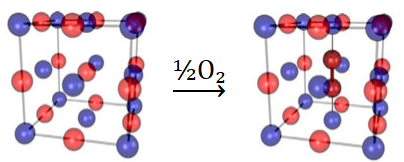
Barium oxide peroxidation from oxygen uptake, adapted from Middleburgh et al, 2012.

Calculations using Density Functional Theory (DFT) suggest that the oxygen incorporation reaction is exothermic, and that the most energetically favoured occupation site is indeed the peroxide ion at the oxide lattice — other than interstitial positions, for instance. However, the increased entropy of the system is what leads BaO_{2} to decompose to BaO and release O_{2} between 800 and 1100 K (520 and 820 °C). The reaction was used as a large scale method to produce oxygen before air separation became the dominant method in the beginning of the 20th century. The method was named the Brin process, after its inventors.

== Preparation ==
Barium oxide from metallic barium readily forms from its exothermic oxidation with dioxygen in air:

2 Ba(s) + O_{2}(g) → 2 BaO(s).

It's most commonly made by heating barium carbonate at temperatures of 1000–1450 °C.

BaCO_{3}(s) → BaO(s) + CO_{2}(g)

Likewise, it is often formed through the thermal decomposition of other barium salts, like barium nitrate.

== Safety issues ==
Barium oxide is an irritant. If it contacts the skin or the eyes or is inhaled it causes pain and redness. However, it is more dangerous when ingested. It can cause nausea and diarrhea, muscle paralysis, cardiac arrhythmia, and can cause death. If ingested, medical attention should be sought immediately.

Barium oxide should not be released environmentally; it is harmful to aquatic organisms.

== See also ==
- Barium
