= Barium sulfide =

Chemical compound

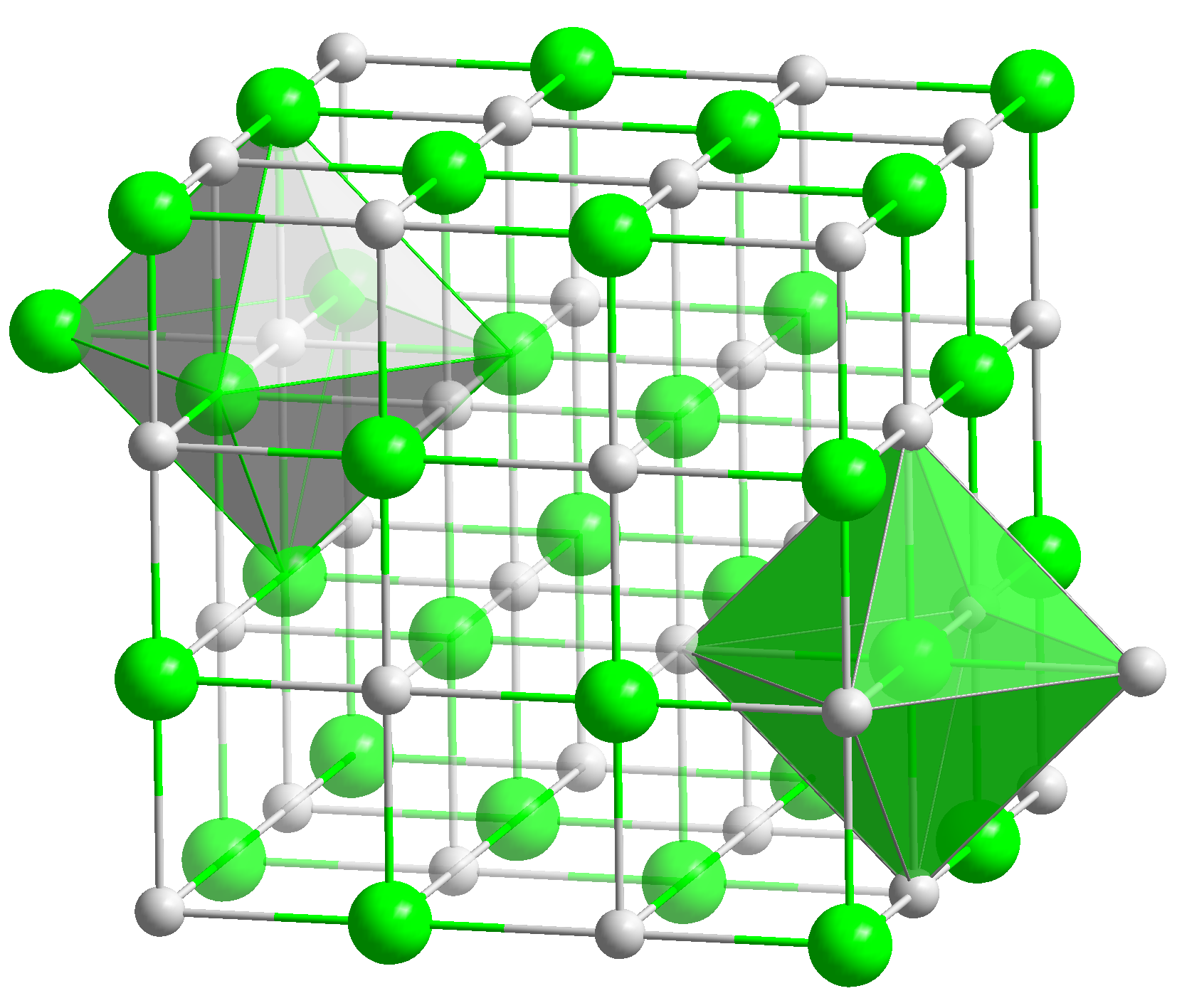

Identifiers
| CAS Number | 21109-95-5 |
| 3D model (JSmol) | Interactive image |
| ChEBI | CHEBI:32590 |
| ChemSpider | 5256933 |
| ECHA InfoCard | 100.040.180 |
| EC Number | 244-214-4 |
| Gmelin Reference | 13627 |
| PubChem CID | 6857597 |
| UNII | TV3U2GEW4H |
| UN number | UN3134 |
| CompTox Dashboard (EPA) | DTXSID30892157 |
- InChI: InChI=1S/Ba.S/q+2;-2 Key: CJDPJFRMHVXWPT-UHFFFAOYSA-N; InChI=1/Ba.S/q+2;-2 Key: CJDPJFRMHVXWPT-UHFFFAOYAO
- SMILES: [Ba+2].[S-2]

Properties
| Chemical formula | BaS |
| Molar mass | 169.39 g·mol^{−1} |
| Appearance | White solid |
| Odor | Rotten-egg like |
| Density | 4.3 g/cm^{3} (20 °C (68 °F)) |
| Melting point | 2,235 °C (4,055 °F; 2,508 K) |
| Boiling point | decomposes |
| Solubility in water | 8.94 g/100 mL (25 °C (77 °F)); Reacts (100 °C (212 °F)) |
| Dipole moment | 10.86 |

Structure
| Crystal structure | Halite (cubic), cF8 |
| Space group | Fm3̅m, No. 225 |
| Point group | m3̅m |
| Lattice constant | a = 6.45 Å, b = 6.45 Å, c = 6.45 Å α = 90°, β = 90°, γ = 90° |
| Lattice volume (V) | 268.50 Å^{3} |
| Formula units (Z) | 4 |
| Coordination geometry | Octahedral (Ba^{2+}); Octahedral (S^{2−}) |

Thermochemistry
| Heat capacity (C) | 49.4 J⋅mol^{−1}⋅K^{−1} |
| Std molar entropy (S^{⦵}_{298}) | 78.2 J⋅mol^{−1}⋅K^{−1} |
| Std enthalpy of formation (Δ_{f}H^{⦵}_{298}) | −460.0 kJ⋅mol^{−1} |
| Gibbs free energy (Δ_{f}G^{⦵}) | −456.0 kJ⋅mol^{−1} |
| Enthalpy of fusion (Δ_{f}H^{⦵}_{fus}) | 63 kJ⋅mol^{−1} |

Hazards
- GHS labelling
| Pictograms | (GHS06: Toxic) (GHS07: Exclamation mark) (GHS09: Environmental hazard) |
| Signal word | Danger |
| Hazard statements | H290, H301, H314, H332, H400 |
| Precautionary statements | P234, P260, P264, P270, P271, P273, P280, P301+P310+P330, P301+P330+P331, P303+P361+P353, P304+P340+P310, P305+P351+P338+P310, P363, P390, P391, P405, P501 |
| NFPA 704 (fire diamond) | 3 0 0 |
| Threshold limit value (TLV) | 0.5 mg/m^{3} (as Ba) (TWA) |
- Lethal dose or concentration (LD, LC)
| LD_{50} (median dose) | 271 mg/kg (rat, oral) |
- NIOSH (US health exposure limits)
| PEL (Permissible) | 0.5 mg/m^{3} |
| REL (Recommended) | 0.5 mg/m^{3} |
| IDLH (Immediate danger) | 50 mg/m^{3} |

Related compounds
| Other anions | Barium hydrosulfide; Barium disulfide; Dibarium trisulfide; Barium trisulfide; Barium pentasulfide; Barium oxide; Barium selenide |
| Other cations | Beryllium sulfide; Magnesium sulfide; Calcium sulfide; Strontium sulfide |
- Except where otherwise noted, data are given for materials in their standard state (at 25 °C [77 °F], 100 kPa). verify (what is ?) Infobox references

Barium sulfide is the inorganic compound with the formula BaS. BaS is the barium compound produced on the largest scale. It is an important precursor to other barium compounds including barium carbonate and the pigment lithopone, ZnS/BaSO_{4}. Like other chalcogenides of the alkaline earth metals, BaS is a short wavelength emitter for electronic displays. It is colorless, although like many sulfides, it is commonly obtained in impure colored forms.

== Discovery ==
BaS was prepared by the Italian alchemist Vincenzo Cascariolo (also known as Vincentius or Vincentinus Casciarolus or Casciorolus, 1571–1624) via the thermo-chemical reduction of barium sulfate (BaSO_{4}, available as the mineral barite). It is currently manufactured by an improved version of Cascariolo's process using coke in place of flour and charcoal. This kind of conversion is called a carbothermic reaction:

BaSO_{4} + 2 C → BaS + 2 CO_{2}

and also:

BaSO_{4} + 4 C → BaS + 4 CO

The basic method remains in use today. BaS dissolves in water. These aqueous solutions, when treated with sodium carbonate or carbon dioxide, give a white solid of barium carbonate (BaCO_{3}), a source material for many commercial barium compounds.

According to Harvey (1957), in 1603, Vincenzo Cascariolo used barite, found at the bottom of Mount Paterno near Bologna, in one of his non-fruitful attempts to produce gold. After grinding and heating the mineral with charcoal under reducing conditions, he obtained a persistent luminescent material that soon came to be known as Lapis Boloniensis, or Bolognian stone. The phosphorescence of the material obtained by Casciarolo made it a curiosity.

== Preparation ==
A modern procedure proceeds from barium carbonate and hydrogen sulfide (H_{2}S) at 100 °C (212 °F):

BaCO_{3} + H_{2}S BaS + H_{2}O + CO_{2}

It may also be prepared by direct calcination of the elements in a ratio of 1:1.05 (Barium:Sulfur) in an inert atmosphere:

Ba + S BaS

Various other barium sulfides are produced when an excess of sulfur is used depending on the ratio.

== Properties ==
The observed melting point of barium sulfide is highly sensitive to impurities.

== Safety ==
BaS is poisonous by ingestion or inhalation, as are other water soluble or acid-reactive barium compounds. It evolves toxic hydrogen sulfide gas on contact with acids or high temperature water.

Acute barium poisoning through ingestion or inhalation of large amounts causes a rapid onset of gastrointestinal symptoms and hypoalkemia. Chronic exposure may cause adverse renal effects. It is believed that the mechanism of toxicity may be due to the action of barium as a competive potassium channel antagonist, which shifts extracellular potassium to intracellular resultsing in a diminished ability of nerve cells to respond to stimulation.
