= Barium carbonate =

Chemical compound

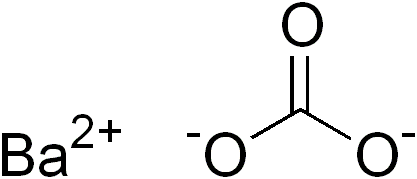
- Skeletal formula of barium carbonate

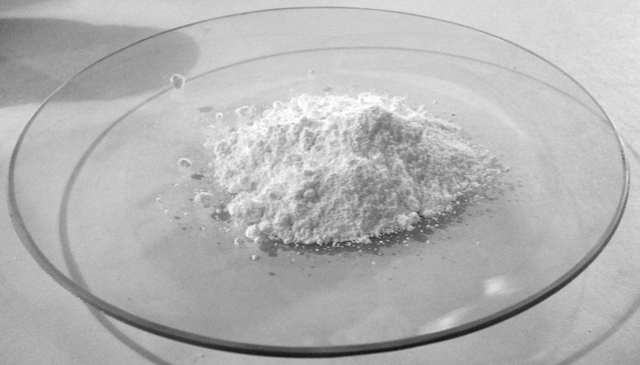
- Powder of barium carbonate

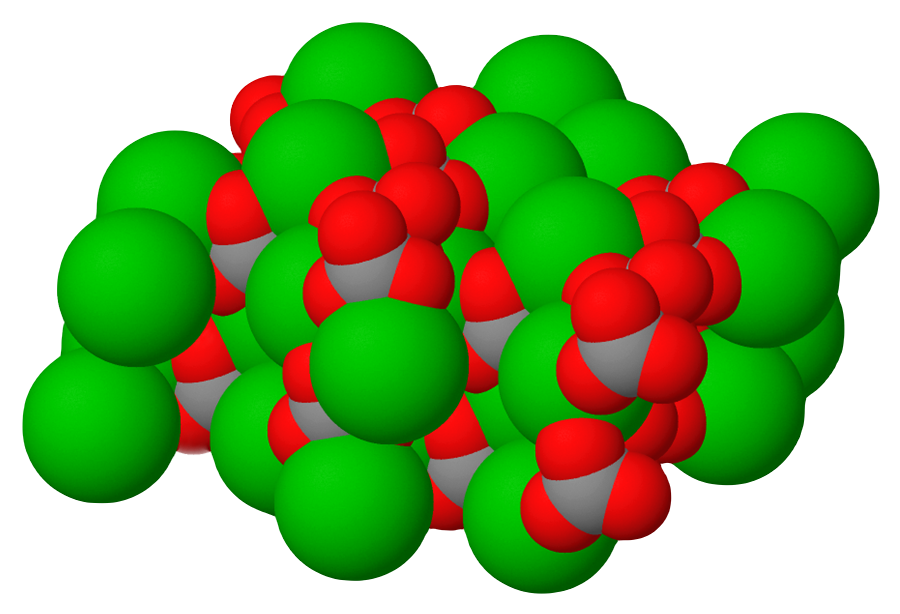

Names
- Other names Witherite

Identifiers
CAS Number	513-77-9
3D model (JSmol)	Interactive image; Interactive image
ChEBI	CHEBI:190439
ChemSpider	10121
ECHA InfoCard	100.007.426
EC Number	208-167-3
PubChem CID	10563
RTECS number	CQ8600000
UNII	6P669D8HQ8
UN number	1564
CompTox Dashboard (EPA)	DTXSID1029623
- InChI: InChI=1S/CH2O3.Ba/c2-1(3)4;/h(H2,2,3,4);/q;+2/p-2 Key: AYJRCSIUFZENHW-UHFFFAOYSA-L; InChI=1/CH2O3.Ba/c2-1(3)4;/h(H2,2,3,4);/q;+2/p-2 Key: AYJRCSIUFZENHW-NUQVWONBAT
- SMILES: [Ba+2].[O-]C([O-])=O; C(=O)([O-])[O-].[Ba+2]

Properties
Chemical formula	BaCO_{3}
Molar mass	197.335 g·mol^{−1}
Appearance	white crystals
Odor	odorless
Density	4.286 g/cm^{3}
Melting point	811 °C (1,492 °F; 1,084 K) polymorphic transformation
Boiling point	1,450 °C (2,640 °F; 1,720 K) decomposes from 1,360 °C (2,480 °F; 1,630 K)
Solubility in water	16 mg/L (8.8 °C (47.8 °F; 281.9 K)); 22 mg/L (18 °C (64 °F; 291 K)); 24 mg/L (20 °C (68 °F; 293 K)); 24 mg/L (24.2 °C (75.6 °F; 297.3 K))
Solubility product (K_{sp})	2.58×10^{−9}
Solubility in acid	decomposes
Magnetic susceptibility (χ)	−58.9×10^{−6} cm^{3}/mol
Refractive index (n_{D})	1.676

Structure
Crystal structure	orthorhombic

Thermochemistry
Heat capacity (C)	85.35 J/mol·K
Std molar entropy (S^{⦵}_{298})	112 J/mol·K
Std enthalpy of formation (Δ_{f}H^{⦵}_{298})	−1219 kJ/mol
Gibbs free energy (Δ_{f}G^{⦵})	−1139 kJ/mol

Hazards
- GHS labelling
Pictograms	(GHS07: Exclamation mark)
Signal word	Warning
Hazard statements	H302
Precautionary statements	P264, P270, P301+P312+P330, P501
NFPA 704 (fire diamond)	2 0 0
Flash point	Nonflammable
- Lethal dose or concentration (LD, LC)
LD_{50} (median dose)	418 mg/kg (rat, oral)
- NIOSH (US health exposure limits)
REL (Recommended)	0.5 mg/m^{3}
Safety data sheet (SDS)	Sigma-Aldrich

Related compounds
Other anions	Barium chlorate; Barium chloride; Barium chromate; Barium perchlorate; Barium peroxide; Barium sulfate
Other cations	Beryllium carbonate; Magnesium carbonate; Calcium carbonate; Strontium carbonate; Radium carbonate
- Except where otherwise noted, data are given for materials in their standard state (at 25 °C [77 °F], 100 kPa). verify (what is ?) Infobox references

Barium carbonate is the inorganic compound with the formula BaCO_{3}. Like most alkaline earth metal carbonates, it is a white salt that is poorly soluble in water. It occurs as the mineral known as witherite. In a commercial sense, it is one of the most important barium compounds.

== Preparation ==
Barium carbonate is made commercially from barium sulfide by treatment with sodium carbonate at 60 to 70 °C (140 to 158 °F) (soda ash method) or, more commonly carbon dioxide at 40 to 90 °C (104 to 194 °F):

BaS + H_{2}O + CO_{2} → BaCO_{3} + H_{2}S

== Reactions ==
Barium carbonate reacts with acids such as hydrochloric acid to form soluble barium salts, such as barium chloride:

BaCO_{3} + 2 HCl → BaCl_{2} + CO_{2} + H_{2}O

Pyrolysis of barium carbonate gives barium oxide.

== Uses ==
Barium carbonate is mainly used to remove sulfate impurities from feedstock of the chlor-alkali process. Otherwise it is a common precursor to barium-containing compounds such as ferrites.

=== Rat poison ===
Barium carbonate has been used as a rat poison, although this use is now considered obsolete. In 2009, 12 people died in Chittagong, Bangladesh when flour used to prepare a meal was contaminated with rat poison containing barium carbonate.

=== Other uses ===
Barium carbonate is widely used in the ceramics industry as an ingredient in glazes. It acts as a flux, a matting and crystallizing agent and combines with certain colouring oxides to produce unique colours not easily attainable by other means. Its use is somewhat controversial since it can leach from glazes into food and drink. To reduce toxicity concerns, it is often substituted with strontium carbonate, which behaves in a similar way in glazes but is of lower toxicity.

In the brick, tile, earthenware and pottery industries barium carbonate is added to clays to precipitate soluble salts (calcium sulfate and magnesium sulfate) that cause efflorescence.

It is sometimes used as an "energiser" in the Case-hardening process.
