= Barium sulfate =

Inorganic chemical compound

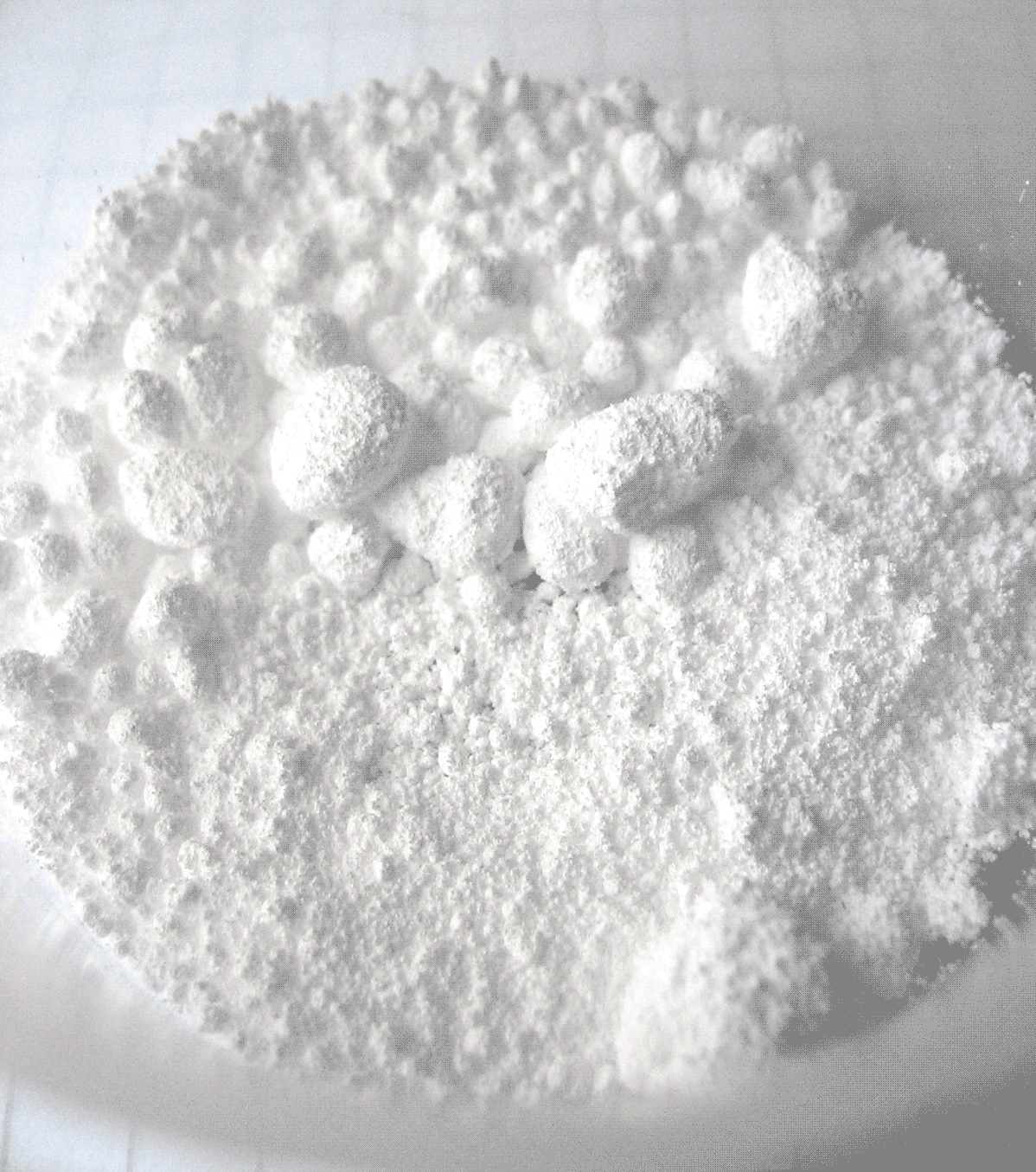

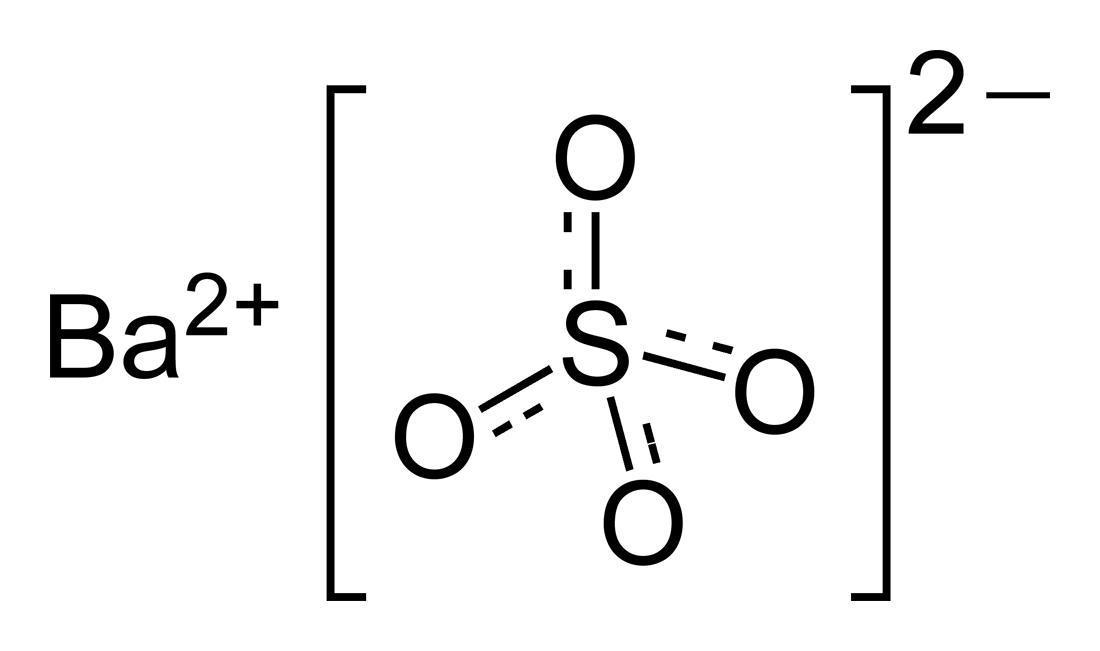
- Chemical structure of barium sulfate

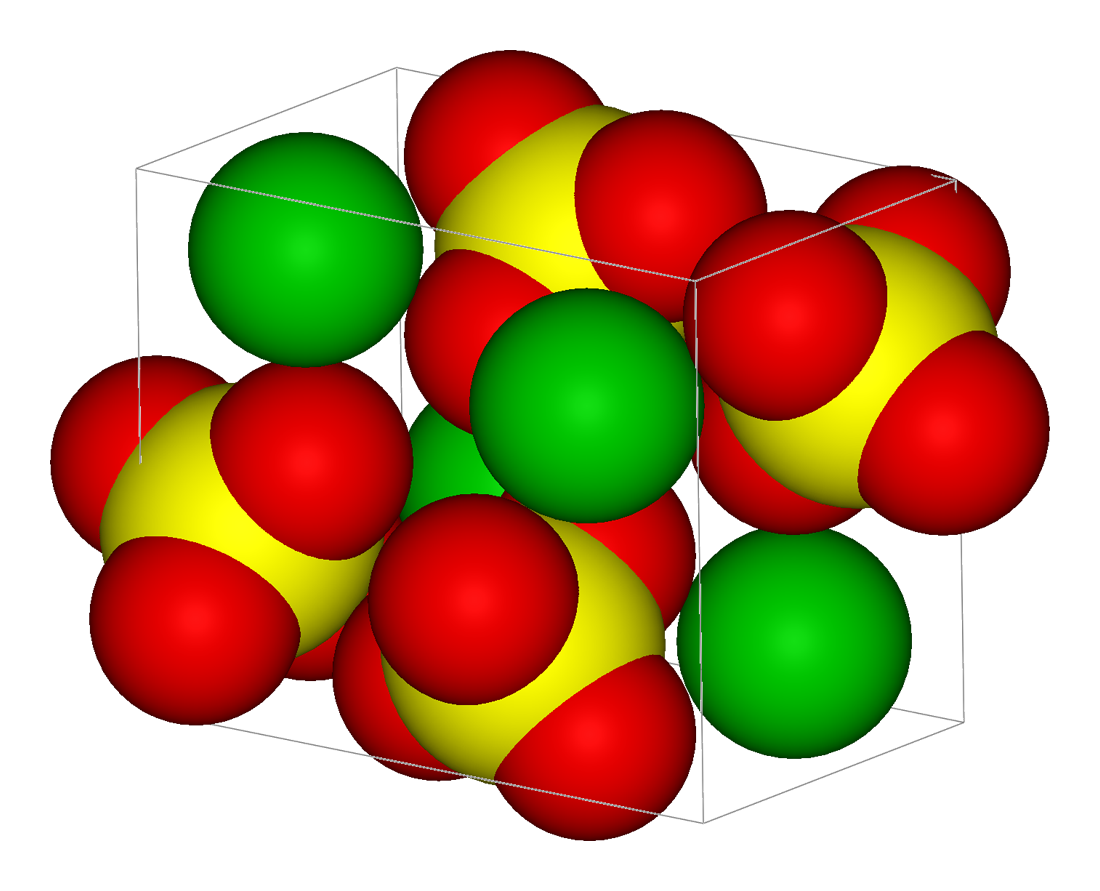
3D model of barium sulfate

Identifiers
CAS Number	7727-43-7
3D model (JSmol)	Interactive image
ChEBI	CHEBI:133326
ChEMBL	ChEMBL2105897
ChemSpider	22823
DrugBank	DB11150
ECHA InfoCard	100.028.896
EC Number	231-784-4
KEGG	D02052
PubChem CID	24414
RTECS number	CR060000
UNII	25BB7EKE2E
UN number	1564
CompTox Dashboard (EPA)	DTXSID0050471
- InChI: InChI=1S/Ba.H2O4S/c;1-5(2,3)4/h;(H2,1,2,3,4)/q+2;/p-2 Key: TZCXTZWJZNENPQ-UHFFFAOYSA-L
- SMILES: [Ba+2].[O-]S([O-])(=O)=O

Properties
Chemical formula	BaSO_{4}
Molar mass	233.39 g/mol
Appearance	white crystalline
Odor	odorless
Density	4.49 g/cm^{3}
Melting point	1,580 °C (2,880 °F; 1,850 K)
Boiling point	1,600 °C (2,910 °F; 1,870 K) (decomposes)
Solubility in water	2.448 mg/L (20 °C); 2.85 mg/L (30 °C)
Solubility product (K_{sp})	1.0842 × 10^{−10} (25 °C)
Solubility	soluble in concentrated, hot sulfuric acid
Solubility in ethanol	Insoluble
Magnetic susceptibility (χ)	−71.3·10^{−6} cm^{3}/mol
Refractive index (n_{D})	1.636 (alpha)

Structure
Crystal structure	orthorhombic

Thermochemistry
Heat capacity (C)	101.7 J/(mol K)
Std molar entropy (S^{⦵}_{298})	132 J/(mol·K)
Std enthalpy of formation (Δ_{f}H^{⦵}_{298})	−1465 kJ/mol

Pharmacology
ATC code	V08BA01 (WHO)
Routes of administration	by mouth, rectal
- Pharmacokinetics
Bioavailability	negligible by mouth
Excretion	rectal
Legal status	US: ℞-only

Hazards
- GHS labelling
Precautionary statements	P260, P264, P270, P273, P314, P501
NFPA 704 (fire diamond)	0 0 0
Flash point	noncombustible
- NIOSH (US health exposure limits)
PEL (Permissible)	TWA 15 mg/m^{3} (total) TWA 5 mg/m^{3} (resp)
REL (Recommended)	TWA 10 mg/m^{3} (total) TWA 5 mg/m^{3} (resp)
IDLH (Immediate danger)	N.D.
- Except where otherwise noted, data are given for materials in their standard state (at 25 °C [77 °F], 100 kPa). verify (what is ?) Infobox references

Barium sulfate is the inorganic compound with the chemical formula BaSO_{4}. It is a white crystalline solid that is odorless and insoluble in water. It occurs in nature as the mineral barite, which is the main commercial source of barium and materials prepared from it. Its opaque white appearance and its high density are exploited in its main applications.

== Uses ==
=== Drilling fluids ===
About 80% of the world's barium sulfate production, mostly purified mineral, is consumed as a component of oil well drilling fluid. It increases the density of the fluid, increasing the hydrostatic pressure in the well and reducing the chance of a blowout.

=== Radiocontrast agent ===
Barium sulfate in suspension is often used medically as a radiocontrast agent for X-ray imaging and other diagnostic procedures. It is most often used in imaging of the GI tract during what is colloquially known as a "barium meal". It is administered orally, or by enema, as a suspension of fine particles in a thick milk-like solution (often with sweetening and flavoring agents added). Although barium is a heavy metal, and its water-soluble compounds are often highly toxic, the low solubility of barium sulfate protects the patient from absorbing harmful amounts of the metal. Barium sulfate is also readily removed from the body, unlike Thorotrast, which it replaced. Due to the relatively high atomic number (Z = 56) of barium, its compounds absorb X-rays more strongly than compounds derived from lighter nuclei.

=== Pigment ===
The majority of synthetic barium sulfate is used as a component of white pigment for paints. In oil paint, barium sulfate is almost transparent, and is used as a filler or to modify consistency. One major manufacturer of artists' oil paint sells "permanent white" that contains a mixture of titanium white pigment (TiO_{2}) and barium sulfate. The combination of barium sulfate and zinc sulfide (ZnS) is the inorganic pigment called lithopone. In photography it is used as a coating for certain photographic papers. It is also used as a coating to diffuse light evenly.

=== Light-reflecting paint for cooling ===
Barium sulfate is highly reflective, of both visible and ultraviolet light. Researchers used it as an ingredient in paint that reflects 98.1% of solar radiation, allowing surfaces to which it has been applied to stay cooler in sunlit conditions. Commercially available white paints only reflect 80–90% of solar radiation. By using hexagonal nanoplatelet boron nitride, the thickness of a coat of this type of paint was reduced to 0.15 mm.

=== Paper brightener ===
A thin layer of barium sulfate called baryta is first coated on the base surface of most photographic paper to increase the reflectiveness of the image, with the first such paper introduced in 1884 in Germany. The light-sensitive silver halide emulsion is then coated over the baryta layer. The baryta coating limits the penetration of the emulsion into the fibers of the paper and makes the emulsion more even, resulting in more uniform blacks. Further coatings may then be present for fixing and protection of the image. Baryta has also been used to brighten papers intended for ink-jet printing.

=== Plastics filler ===
Barium sulfate is commonly used as a filler for plastics to increase the density of the polymer in vibrational mass damping applications. In polypropylene and polystyrene plastics, it is used as a filler in proportions up to 70%. It has an effect of increasing acid and alkali resistance and opacity. Such composites are also used as X-ray shielding materials due to their enhanced radio-opacity. In cases where machinability and weight are a concern, composites with high mass fraction (70–80%) of barium sulfate may be preferred to the more commonly used steel shields.

Barium sulfate can also be used to enhance the material properties of HDPE, although typically in relatively low concentrations, and often in combination with other fillers like calcium carbonate or titanium oxide.

=== Niche uses ===
Barium sulfate is used in soil testing. Tests for soil pH and other qualities of soil use colored indicators, and small particles (usually clay) from the soil can cloud the test mixture and make it hard to see the color of the indicator. Barium sulfate added to the mixture binds with these particles, making them heavier so they fall to the bottom, leaving a clearer solution.

In colorimetry, barium sulfate is used as a near-perfect diffuser when measuring light sources.

In metal casting, the moulds used are often coated with barium sulfate in order to prevent the molten metal from bonding with the mould.

It is also used in brake linings, anacoustic foams, powder coatings, and root canal filling.

Barium sulfate is an ingredient in the "rubber" pellets used by Chilean police. This together with silica helps the pellet attain a 96.5 Shore A hardness.

==== Catalyst support ====
Barium sulfate is used as a catalyst support when selectively hydrogenating functional groups that are sensitive to overreduction. With a low surface area, the contact time of the substrate with the catalyst is shorter and thus selectivity is achieved. Palladium on barium sulfate is also used as a catalyst in the Rosenmund reduction.

==== Pyrotechnics ====
As barium compounds emit a characteristic green light when heated at high temperature, barium salts are often used in green pyrotechnic formulas, although nitrate and chlorate salts are more common. Barium sulfate is commonly used as a component of "strobe" pyrotechnic compositions.

==== Copper industry ====
As barium sulfate has a high melting point and is insoluble in water, it is used as a release material in casting of copper anode plates. The anode plates are cast in copper molds, so to avoid the direct contact of the liquid copper with the solid copper mold, a suspension of fine barium sulfate powder in water is used as a coating on the mold surface. Thus, when the molten copper solidifies in form of an anode plate it can be easily released from its mold.

==== Radiometric measurements ====
Barium sulfate is sometimes used, besides polytetrafluoroethylene (PTFE), to coat the interior of integrating spheres due to the high reflectance of the material and near Lambertian characteristics.

==== 3D printing of firearms ====
Barium sulfate is listed among the materials acceptable to the Bureau of Alcohol, Tobacco, Firearms and Explosives (BATFE) for the manufacturing of firearms and/or components that are made of plastic, to achieve compliance with the U.S. federal requirement that an X-ray machine must be able to accurately depict the shape of the plastic firearm or component.

=== Anti-mine coating ===
Barium sulfate was the main ingredient in the Zimmerit coating used to protect German armored fighting vehicles from magnetically attached anti-tank mines during World War II.

=== Biological occurrences ===
Barium sulfate is also used by the Loxodes genus of ciliates in organelles known as Müller vesicles, which are involved in the sensing of gravity.

== Production ==
Almost all of the barium consumed commercially is obtained from barite, which is often highly impure. Barite is processed by thermo-chemical sulfate reduction (TSR), also known as carbothermal reduction (heating with coke) to give barium sulfide:

BaSO_{4} + 4 C → BaS + 4 CO

In contrast to barium sulfate, barium sulfide is soluble in water and readily converted to the oxide, carbonate, and halides. To produce highly pure barium sulfate, the sulfide or chloride is treated with sulfuric acid or sulfate salts:

BaS + H_{2}SO_{4} → BaSO_{4} + H_{2}S

Barium sulfate produced in this way is often called blanc fixe, which is French for "permanent white". Blanc fixe is the form of barium encountered in consumer products, such as paints.

In the laboratory barium sulfate is generated by combining solutions of barium ions and sulfate salts. Because barium sulfate is the least toxic salt of barium due to its insolubility, wastes containing barium salts are sometimes treated with sodium sulfate to immobilize (detoxify) the barium. Barium sulfate is one of the most insoluble salts of sulfate. Its low solubility is exploited in qualitative inorganic analysis as a test for Ba^{2+} ions, as well as for sulfate.

Untreated raw materials such as natural baryte formed under hydrothermal conditions may contain many impurities, a.o., quartz, or even amorphous silica.

== History ==
Barium sulfate is reduced to barium sulfide by carbon. The accidental discovery of this conversion many centuries ago led to the discovery of the first synthetic phosphor. The sulfide, unlike the sulfate, is water-soluble.

During the early part of the 20th century, during the Japanese colonization period, hokutolite was found to exist naturally in the Beitou hot-springs area near Taipei City, Taiwan. Hokutolite is a radioactive mineral composed mostly of PbSO_{4} and BaSO_{4}, but also containing traces of uranium, thorium and radium. The Japanese harvested these elements for industrial uses, and also developed dozens of “therapeutic hot-spring baths” in the area.

== Safety aspects ==
Although soluble salts of barium are moderately toxic to humans, barium sulfate is nontoxic due to its insolubility. The most common means of inadvertent barium poisoning arises from the consumption of soluble barium salts mislabeled as BaSO_{4}. In the Celobar incident (Brazil, 2003), nine patients died from improperly prepared radiocontrast agent. In regards to occupational exposures, the Occupational Safety and Health Administration set a permissible exposure limit at 15 mg/m^{3}, while the National Institute for Occupational Safety and Health has a recommended exposure limit at 10 mg/m^{3}. For respiratory exposures, both agencies have set an occupational exposure limit at 5 mg/m^{3}.

== See also ==
- Baryte
- List of inorganic pigments
