= Beryllium sulfide =

Chemical compound

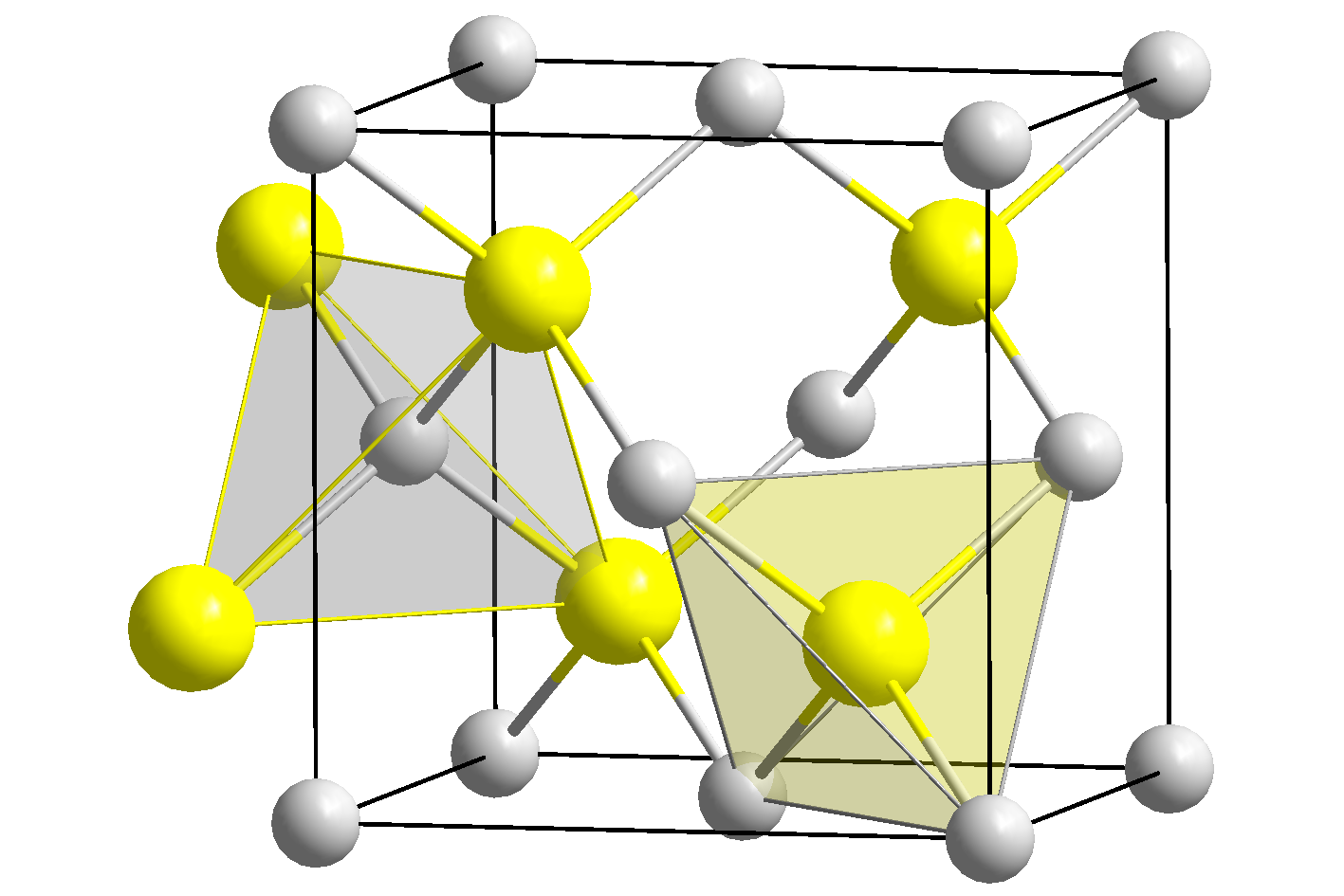

Identifiers
CAS Number	13598-22-6
3D model (JSmol)	Interactive image
ChemSpider	44415277
ECHA InfoCard	100.033.680
EC Number	237-064-6
PubChem CID	83605
CompTox Dashboard (EPA)	DTXSID1065556
- InChI: InChI=1S/Be.S Key: FQDSYGKTHDFFCM-UHFFFAOYSA-N
- SMILES: [Be+2].[S-2]

Properties
Chemical formula	BeS
Molar mass	41.077 g/mol
Appearance	white crystalline
Density	2.36 g/cm^{3}
Melting point	1,800 °C (3,270 °F; 2,070 K) decomposes
Solubility in water	Decomposes
Band gap	7.4 eV
Refractive index (n_{D})	1.741

Structure
Crystal structure	cubic
Space group	F4̅3m

Thermochemistry
Heat capacity (C)	34 J/mol K
Std molar entropy (S^{⦵}_{298})	34 J/mol K
Std enthalpy of formation (Δ_{f}H^{⦵}_{298})	−235 kJ/mol

Hazards
- NIOSH (US health exposure limits)
PEL (Permissible)	TWA 0.002 mg/m^{3} C 0.005 mg/m^{3} (30 minutes), with a maximum peak of 0.025 mg/m^{3} (as Be)
REL (Recommended)	Ca C 0.0005 mg/m^{3} (as Be)
IDLH (Immediate danger)	Ca [4 mg/m^{3} (as Be)]
- Except where otherwise noted, data are given for materials in their standard state (at 25 °C [77 °F], 100 kPa). Infobox references

Beryllium sulfide (BeS) is an ionic compound from the sulfide group with the formula BeS. It is a white solid with a sphalerite structure that is decomposed by water and acids.

== Preparation ==
Beryllium sulfide powders can be prepared by the reaction of sulfur and beryllium in a hydrogen atmosphere by heating the mixture for 10-20 minutes at temperatures from 1000-1300 °C. If done at 900 °C, there are beryllium metal impurities.

Alternatively, it can be prepared by the reaction of beryllium chloride and hydrogen sulfide at 900 °C.
