= Beryllium carbide =

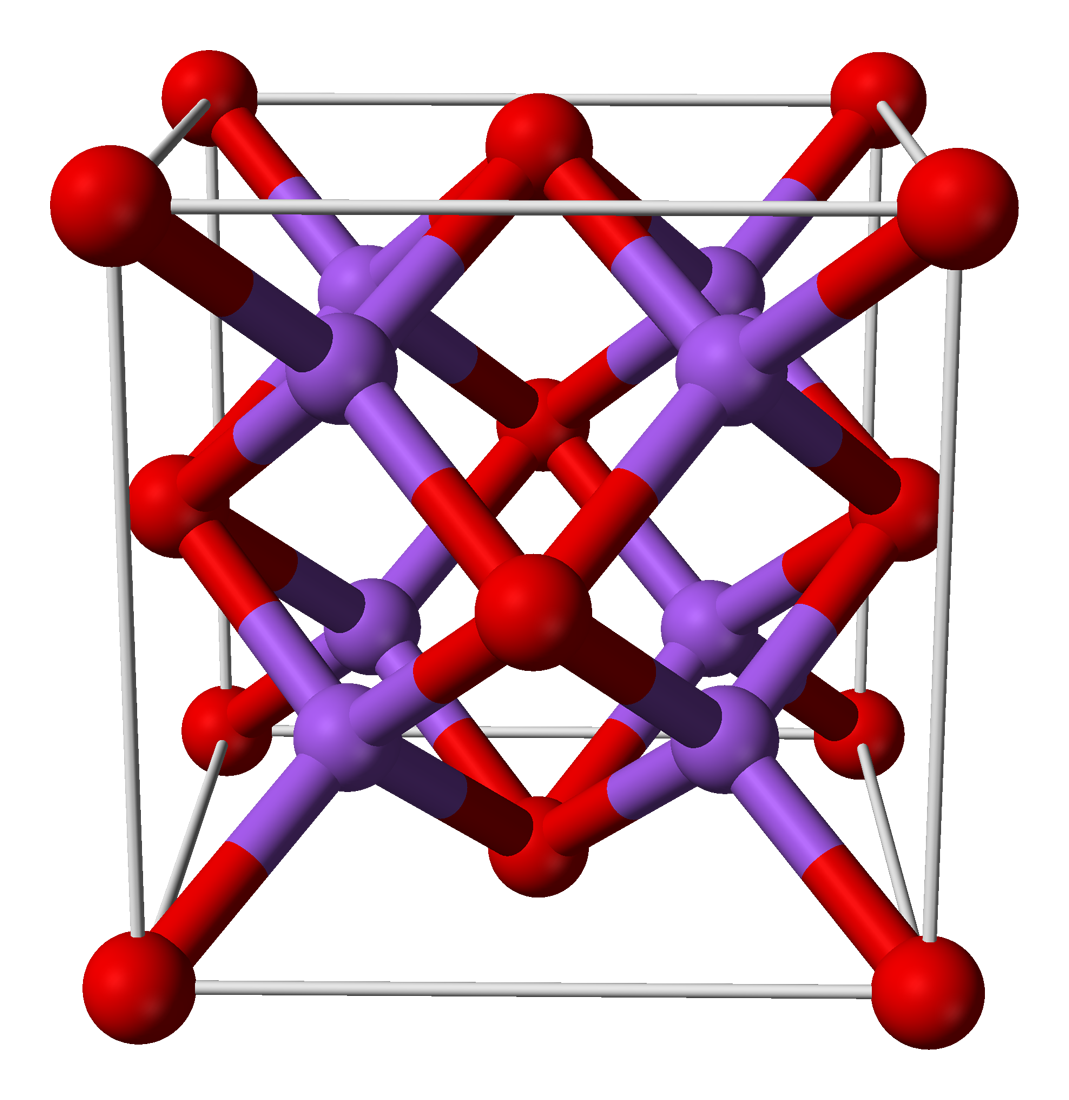

Names
- IUPAC name Beryllium carbide
- Other names Beryllium methanide

Identifiers
| CAS Number | 506-66-1 |
| 3D model (JSmol) | Interactive image |
| ChemSpider | 61480 |
| ECHA InfoCard | 100.007.319 |
| EC Number | 208-050-7 |
| PubChem CID | 68173 |
| UNII | F5D2F26ONX |
| CompTox Dashboard (EPA) | DTXSID6060137 |
- InChI: InChI=1S/C.2Be Key: UQVOJETYKFAIRZ-UHFFFAOYSA-N
- SMILES: [Be]=C=[Be]

Properties
| Chemical formula | Be_{2}C |
| Molar mass | 30.035 g·mol^{−1} |
| Appearance | Yellow to red crystals |
| Odor | odorless |
| Density | 1.90 g/cm^{3} (at 15 °C) |
| Melting point | 2,100 °C (3,810 °F; 2,370 K) (decomposes) |
| Solubility in water | decomposes |

Structure
| Crystal structure | cubic |

Hazards
- NIOSH (US health exposure limits)
| PEL (Permissible) | TWA 0.002 mg/m^{3} C 0.005 mg/m^{3} (30 minutes), with a maximum peak of 0.025 mg/m^{3} (as Be) |
| REL (Recommended) | Ca C 0.0005 mg/m^{3} (as Be) |
| IDLH (Immediate danger) | Ca [4 mg/m^{3} (as Be)] |

Related compounds
| Related compounds | Boron carbide; Aluminium carbide; Silicon carbide; Carbon dioxide; Carbon diselenide; Carbon disulfide |
- Except where otherwise noted, data are given for materials in their standard state (at 25 °C [77 °F], 100 kPa). verify (what is ?) Infobox references

Beryllium carbide is a chemical compound with the chemical formula Be_{2}C. It is a metal carbide. Similar to diamond, it is a very hard compound. It is used in nuclear reactors as a core material.

== Preparation ==
Beryllium carbide is prepared by heating the elements beryllium and carbon at elevated temperatures (above 950°C). It also may be prepared by reduction of beryllium oxide with carbon at a temperature above 1,500°C:

2 BeO + 3 C → Be_{2}C + 2 CO

Beryllium carbide decomposes very slowly in water and forms methane gas:

Be_{2}C + 2 H_{2}O → 2 BeO + CH_{4}

The rate of decomposition is faster in mineral acids with evolution of methane.

Be_{2}C + 4 H^{+} → 2 Be^{2+} + CH_{4}

In hot concentrated alkali the reaction is very rapid, forming alkali metal beryllates and methane:

Be_{2}C + 4 OH^{−} → 2 BeO^{2−}_{2} + CH_{4}

== See also ==
- Carbide
