= Beryllium nitride =

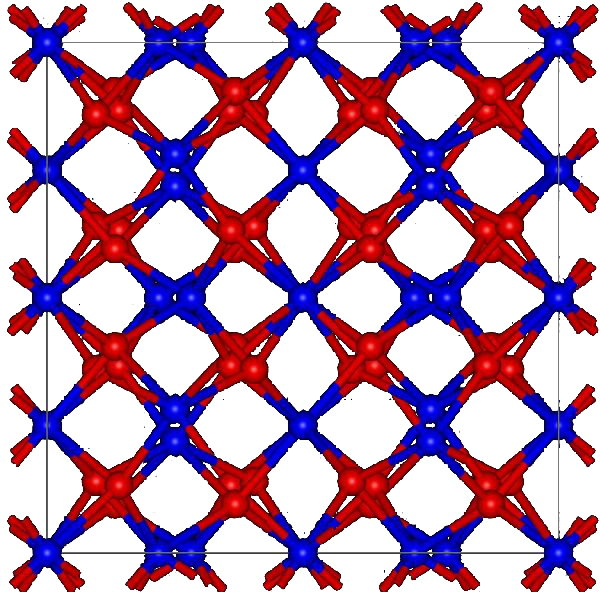

Names
- IUPAC name Beryllium nitride
- Other names triberyllium dinitride

Identifiers
CAS Number	1304-54-7
3D model (JSmol)	Interactive image
ECHA InfoCard	100.013.757
EC Number	215-132-6
UNII	P0T5F6IUK4
- InChI: InChI=1S/3Be.2N
- SMILES: [Be]=N[Be]N=[Be]

Properties
Chemical formula	Be_{3}N_{2}
Molar mass	55.051 g·mol^{−1}
Appearance	yellow or white powder
Density	2.71 g/cm^{3}
Melting point	2,200 °C (3,990 °F; 2,470 K)
Boiling point	2,240 °C (4,060 °F; 2,510 K) (decomposes)
Solubility in water	decomposes
Solubility	decomposes in solutions of acid and base

Structure
Crystal structure	Cubic, cI80, SpaceGroup = Ia-3, No. 206 (α form)

Hazards
- NIOSH (US health exposure limits)
PEL (Permissible)	TWA 0.0002 mg/m^{3}; STEL 0.002 mg/m^{3} (15 minutes)
IDLH (Immediate danger)	4 mg/m^{3} (as Be)

Related compounds
Other cations	Calcium nitride; Magnesium nitride
- Except where otherwise noted, data are given for materials in their standard state (at 25 °C [77 °F], 100 kPa). verify (what is ?) Infobox references

Beryllium nitride, Be_{3}N_{2}, is a nitride of beryllium. It can be prepared from the elements at high temperature (1,100–1,500 °C (2,010–2,730 °F)); unlike beryllium azide or BeN_{6}, it decomposes in vacuum into beryllium and nitrogen. It is readily hydrolysed forming beryllium hydroxide and ammonia. It has two polymorphic forms: cubic α−Be_{3}N_{2} with a defect anti-fluorite structure, and hexagonal β−Be_{3}N_{2}. It reacts with silicon nitride, Si_{3}N_{4} in a stream of ammonia at 1,800–1,900 °C (3,270–3,450 °F) to form BeSiN_{2}.

== Preparation ==
Beryllium nitride is prepared by heating beryllium metal powder with dry nitrogen in an oxygen-free atmosphere at temperatures between 700 and 1,400 °C (1,292 and 2,552 °F):

3 Be + N_{2} → B_{3}N_{2}

== Uses ==
It is used in refractory ceramics as well as in nuclear reactors.

It is used to produce radioactive carbon-14 for tracer applications by the ^{14}_{7}N + n → ^{14}_{6}C + p reaction. It is favored due to its stability, high nitrogen content (50%), and the very low capture cross section of beryllium for neutrons.

== Reactions ==
Beryllium nitride reacts with mineral acids producing ammonia and the corresponding salts of the acids:

Be_{3}N_{2} + 6 HCl → 3 BeCl_{2} + 2 NH_{3}

In strong alkali solutions, a beryllate forms, with evolution of ammonia:

Be_{3}N_{2} + 6 NaOH → 3 Na_{2}BeO_{2} + 2 NH_{3}

Both the acid and alkali reactions are brisk and vigorous. Reaction with water, however, is very slow:

Be_{3}N_{2} + 6 H_{2}O → 3 Be(OH)_{2} + 2 NH_{3}

Reactions with oxidizing agents are likely to be violent. It is oxidized when heated at 600 °C (1,112 °F) in air.
