= Beryllium hydroxide =

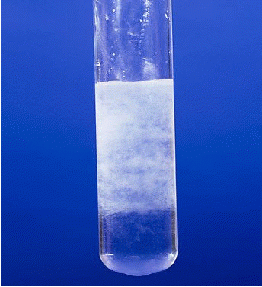

Names
- IUPAC name Beryllium hydroxide
- Other names: Beryllic acid; Hydrated beryllia

Identifiers
CAS Number	13327-32-7
3D model (JSmol)	Interactive image
ChEBI	CHEBI:35102
ChemSpider	24110
ECHA InfoCard	100.033.048
EC Number	236-368-6
Gmelin Reference	1024
MeSH	Beryllium+hydroxide
PubChem CID	25879
RTECS number	DS3150000
UNII	2X0LRF1T6Q
CompTox Dashboard (EPA)	DTXSID80893932
- InChI: InChI=1S/Be.2H2O/h;2*1H2/q+2;;/p-2 Key: WPJWIROQQFWMMK-UHFFFAOYSA-L; InChI=1/Be.2H2O/h;2*1H2/q+2;;/p-2 Key: WPJWIROQQFWMMK-NUQVWONBAB
- SMILES: O[Be]O

Properties
Chemical formula	BeH_{2}O_{2}
Molar mass	43.026 g·mol^{−1}
Appearance	Vivid white, opaque crystals
Density	1.92 g cm^{−3}
Melting point	(decomposes)
Solubility in water	0.0000023965 g/L
Solubility product (K_{sp})	6.92×10^{−22}
Acidity (pK_{a})	3.7

Structure
Molecular shape	Linear

Thermochemistry
Heat capacity (C)	1.443 J K^{−1}
Std molar entropy (S^{⦵}_{298})	47 J·mol^{−1}·K^{−1}
Std enthalpy of formation (Δ_{f}H^{⦵}_{298})	−904 kJ mol^{−1}
Gibbs free energy (Δ_{f}G^{⦵})	−818 kJ/mol

Hazards
- Occupational safety and health (OHS/OSH)
Main hazards	Carcinogenic
- GHS labelling
Pictograms	(GHS06: Toxic) (GHS08: Health hazard) (GHS09: Environmental hazard)
Signal word	Danger
NFPA 704 (fire diamond)	4 0 0
- Lethal dose or concentration (LD, LC)
LD_{50} (median dose)	4 mg kg^{−1} (intravenous, rat)
- NIOSH (US health exposure limits)
PEL (Permissible)	TWA 0.002 mg/m^{3} C 0.005 mg/m^{3} (30 minutes), with a maximum peak of 0.025 mg/m^{3} (as Be)
REL (Recommended)	Ca C 0.0005 mg/m^{3} (as Be)
IDLH (Immediate danger)	Ca [4 mg/m^{3} (as Be)]

Related compounds
Related compounds	Aluminium oxide Magnesium hydroxide
- Except where otherwise noted, data are given for materials in their standard state (at 25 °C [77 °F], 100 kPa). verify (what is ?) Infobox references

Beryllium hydroxide, Be(OH)_{2}, is an amphoteric hydroxide, dissolving in both acids and alkalis. Industrially, it is produced as a by-product in the extraction of beryllium metal from the ores beryl and bertrandite. The natural pure beryllium hydroxide is rare (in form of the mineral behoite, orthorhombic) or very rare (clinobehoite, monoclinic). When alkali is added to beryllium salt solutions the α-form (a gel) is formed. If this left to stand or boiled, the rhombic β-form precipitates. This has the same structure as zinc hydroxide, Zn(OH)_{2}, with tetrahedral beryllium centers.

== Reactions ==
Beryllium hydroxide is difficult to dissolve in water. With alkalis it dissolves to form the tetrahydroxoberyllate (also known as tetrahydroxidoberyllate) anion, [Be(OH)_{4}]^{2−}. With sodium hydroxide solution:

2 NaOH(aq) + Be(OH)_{2}(s) → Na_{2}[Be(OH)_{4}](aq)

With acids, beryllium salts are formed. For example, with sulfuric acid, H_{2}SO_{4}, beryllium sulfate is formed:

Be(OH)_{2} + H_{2}SO_{4} → BeSO_{4} + 2 H_{2}O

Beryllium hydroxide dehydrates at 400 °C to form the soluble white powder, beryllium oxide:

Be(OH)_{2} → BeO + H_{2}O

Further heating at higher temperature produces acid insoluble BeO.
