= Beryllium-aluminium alloy =

Beryllium-aluminum alloy is an alloy that consists of 62% beryllium and 38% aluminum, by weight, corresponding approximately to an empirical formula of Be_{2}Al. It was first developed in the 1960s by the Lockheed Missiles and Space Company, who called it Lockalloy, and used as a structural metal in the aerospace industry because of its high specific strength and stiffness. The material was used in the Lockheed YF12 aircraft and LGM-30 Minuteman missile systems. In the 1970s production difficulties limited the material to a few specialized uses and by the mid 1970s Lockalloy was no longer commercially available.

In 1990, Materion Beryllium & Composites re-introduced the material into the commercial marketplace as a powder-sintered composite under the trade name of AlBeMet. AlBeMet is the trade name for a beryllium and aluminium metal matrix composite material derived by a powder metallurgy process. AlBeMet AM162 is manufactured by Materion Corporation Brush Beryllium and Composites (formerly known as Brush Wellman).

AlBeMet is formed by hot consolidating gas atomized prealloyed powder. Each powder particle contains aluminium between beryllium dendrites producing a uniform microstructure. Aluminium-beryllium metal matrix composite combines the high modulus and low density characteristics of beryllium with the fabrication and mechanical property behaviors of aluminium.

Due to weight advantage, Be-Al alloys are used in aerospace and satellite applications.

== Basic properties ==
The composition of AlBeMet AM162 by relative weight is 38% Al, 62% Be. AlBeMet has a density of 2.071 g/cm^{3} (0.07482 lb/in^{3}).

=== Mechanical properties ===
The mechanical properties of AM162 have been characterized in all three-product forms with the extruded product form of AlBeMet having a significant design database. The extruded bar is fabricated by cold isostatic pressing (CIPing) the isotropic spherical aluminium-beryllium powder into semi-dense billets and then canning the billet for subsequent extrusion with a minimum of a 4:1 reduction ratio.

Mechanical properties are minimum values at room temperature. Wrought mechanical properties for extrusions are in the longitudinal direction. Transverse properties are generally lower.

A number of standard extrusion dies are available. Rolled product is available in a thickness range of 0.063” to 0.313” × 25” (0.16 to 0.795 cm × 63.5 cm) length times width dependent on gauge. Mechanical properties for HIP’d, extruded, and/or rolled AlBe metal matrix composites are in the annealed condition.

=== Physical properties ===
- High modulus-to-density ratio, 3.8 times that of aluminium or steel, minimizes flexure and reduces the chance of mechanically induced failure.
- Thermal conductivity of approximately 210 W/m⋅K exceeds by about 25% that of common aluminium matrix composites such as Al 6061.
- Polished AlBeMet exhibits significant surface scatter inherent in the composite structure and cannot be eliminated by optical polishing. (Typical surface roughness from an AlBeMet polished surface is in the 200–250 Å finish.) An amorphous coating such as electroless nickel plating is required. Surfaces in the 15 to 20 Å level are achievable. Depending on the coefficient of thermal expansion of the substrate material, a potential penalty of bi-metallic effect (bending forces?) between substrate and nickel surface finish is possible. With the tailoring of electroless nickel, this material dictates that the phosphorus content in the plating bath be approximately 11% to insure a CTE match close to that of the AlBeMet thereby eliminating any bi-metallic effect.

=== Fatigue properties ===
The fatigue properties of AlBeMet extruded material have been tested using the Krause rotating beam fatigue test utilizing fully reversed cycles with a R = +0.1. The fatigue limit, 1 × 10^{7} cycles was about 207 MPa (30 ksi) in the longitudinal direction and 165 MPa (25 ksi) in the transverse direction. This property is approximately 75% of the minimum yield strength at room temperature, which is two times that of typical fatigue properties of 6061-T6 aluminium.

=== Manufacture of AlBeMet components ===
AlBeMet parts can be manufactured with the same techniques normally used for aluminium, meaning that special tools do not need to be developed. Although the material is safe to handle when not being worked on, the toxicity of beryllium dust mean that special precautions must be taken to avoid exposure during machining with respiratory protection needed where dust could be formed.

== See also ==
- Aluminium alloy
