= Beryllium azide =

Names
- IUPAC name Beryllium azide

Identifiers
CAS Number	44606-75-9
3D model (JSmol)	Interactive image
ChemSpider	103867673
PubChem CID	129631211
CompTox Dashboard (EPA)	DTXSID101046664
- InChI: InChI=1S/Be.2N3/c;2*1-3-2/q+2;2*-1 Key: FGTDFEYQGIRFTE-UHFFFAOYSA-N
- SMILES: [Be+2].[N-]=[N+]=[N-].[N-]=[N+]=[N-]

Properties
Chemical formula	Be(N_{3})_{2}
Molar mass	93.054 g·mol^{−1}
Appearance	white solid

Hazards
- NIOSH (US health exposure limits)
PEL (Permissible)	TWA 0.002 mg/m^{3} C 0.005 mg/m^{3} (30 minutes), with a maximum peak of 0.025 mg/m^{3} (as Be)
REL (Recommended)	Ca C 0.0005 mg/m^{3} (as Be)
IDLH (Immediate danger)	Ca [4 mg/m^{3} (as Be)]
- Except where otherwise noted, data are given for materials in their standard state (at 25 °C [77 °F], 100 kPa). verify (what is ?) Infobox references

Beryllium azide, Be(N_{3})_{2}, is an inorganic compound. It is the beryllium analog of hydrazoic acid (HN_{3}).

== Synthesis ==
Beryllium azide has been synthesised by the reaction of beryllium chloride with neat trimethylsilyl azide:

BeCl_{2} + 2 Me_{3}SiN_{3} → Be(N_{3})_{2} + 2 Me_{3}SiCl

Alternatively, dimethylberyllium reacts with hydrazoic acid in dry diethyl ether at −116 °C:

Be(CH_{3})_{2} + 2 HN_{3} → Be(N_{3})_{2} + 2 CH_{4}

== Structure ==
Infrared and Raman spectra suggest that beryllium azide consists of infinite chains, with tetrahedrally coordinated beryllium(II) atoms covalently bridged by one end of the azide units.
