= Beryllium sulfate =

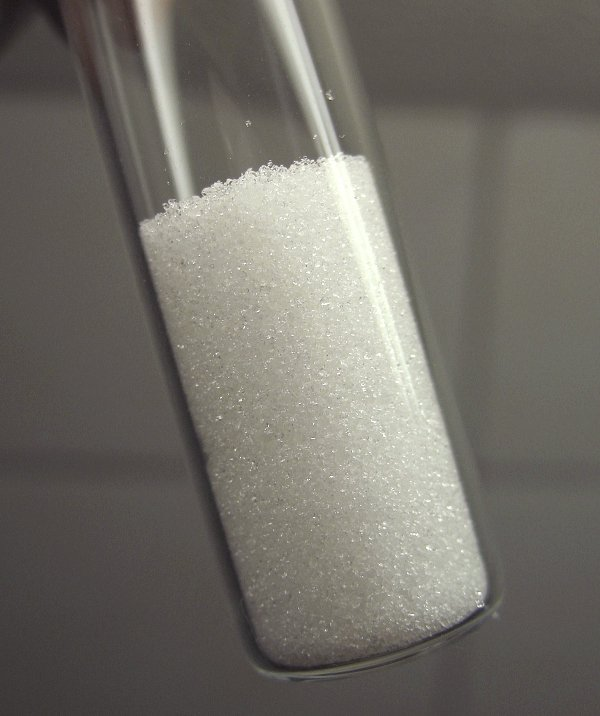

Identifiers
CAS Number	13510-49-1 (anhydrous); 7787-56-6 (tetrahydrate)
3D model (JSmol)	anhydrous: Interactive image; tetrahydrate: Interactive image
ChEBI	CHEBI:53473
ChemSpider	24291
ECHA InfoCard	100.033.478
EC Number	236-842-2
PubChem CID	26077
RTECS number	DS4800000
UNII	01UQ1KPC7E (anhydrous); 2TYK3LF8ZN (tetrahydrate)
CompTox Dashboard (EPA)	DTXSID0020159
- InChI: InChI=1S/Be.H2O4S/c;1-5(2,3)4/h;(H2,1,2,3,4)/q+2;/p-2 Key: KQHXBDOEECKORE-UHFFFAOYSA-L
- SMILES: anhydrous: [Be+2].[O-]S([O-])(=O)=O; tetrahydrate: [OH2+][Be-2]([OH2+])([OH2+])[OH2+].[O-]S([O-])(=O)=O

Properties
Chemical formula	BeSO_{4}
Molar mass	105.075 g/mol (anhydrous); 177.136 g/mol (tetrahydrate)
Appearance	white solid
Odor	odorless
Density	2.44 g/cm^{3} (anhydrous); 1.71 g/cm^{3} (tetrahydrate)
Melting point	110 °C (230 °F; 383 K) (tetrahydrate, −2H_{2}O); 400 °C (dihydrate, dehydr.); 550–600 decomposes
Boiling point	2,500 °C (4,530 °F; 2,770 K) (anhydrate); 580 °C (tetrahydrate)
Solubility in water	362 g/L (0 °C); 400 g/L (20 °C); 543 g/L (60 °C)
Solubility in ethanol	Insoluble
Refractive index (n_{D})	1.4374 (tetrahydrate)

Thermochemistry
Std molar entropy (S^{⦵}_{298})	90 J/mol K
Std enthalpy of formation (Δ_{f}H^{⦵}_{298})	−1197 kJ/mol
Gibbs free energy (Δ_{f}G^{⦵})	−1088 kJ/mol

Hazards
- GHS labelling
Pictograms	(GHS06: Toxic) (GHS07: Exclamation mark) (GHS08: Health hazard) (GHS09: Environmental hazard)
Signal word	Danger
Hazard statements	H301, H315, H317, H319, H330, H335, H350, H350i, H372, H411
Precautionary statements	P203, P260, P264, P264+P265, P270, P271, P272, P273, P280, P284, P301+P316, P302+P352, P304+P340, P305+P351+P338, P316, P318, P319, P320, P321, P330, P333+P317, P337+P317, P362+P364, P391, P403+P233, P405, P501
Flash point	Non-flammable
- Lethal dose or concentration (LD, LC)
LD_{50} (median dose)	82 mg/kg (rat, oral); 80 mg/kg (mouse, oral)
- NIOSH (US health exposure limits)
PEL (Permissible)	TWA 0.002 mg/m^{3} C 0.005 mg/m^{3} (30 minutes), with a maximum peak of 0.025 mg/m^{3} (as Be)
REL (Recommended)	Ca C 0.0005 mg/m^{3} (as Be)
IDLH (Immediate danger)	Ca [4 mg/m^{3} (as Be)]
Safety data sheet (SDS)	ICSC 1351

Related compounds
Other cations	Magnesium sulfate; Calcium sulfate; Strontium sulfate; Barium sulfate
- Except where otherwise noted, data are given for materials in their standard state (at 25 °C [77 °F], 100 kPa). verify (what is ?) Infobox references

Beryllium sulfate normally encountered as the tetrahydrate, [Be(H_{2}O)_{4}]SO_{4} is a white crystalline solid. It was first isolated in 1815 by Jons Jakob Berzelius. Beryllium sulfate may be prepared by treating an aqueous solution of many beryllium salts with sulfuric acid, followed by evaporation of the solution and crystallization. The hydrated product may be converted to anhydrous salt by heating at 400 °C.

== Structure ==
According to X-ray crystallography the tetrahydrate contains a tetrahedral Be(OH_{2})_{4}^{2+} unit and sulfate anions. The small size of the Be^{2+} cation determines the number of water molecules that can be coordinated. In contrast, the analogous magnesium salt, MgSO_{4}·6H_{2}O contains an octahedral Mg(OH_{2})_{6}^{2+} unit. The existence of the tetrahedral [Be(OH_{2})_{4}]^{2+} ion in aqueous solutions of beryllium nitrate and beryllium chloride has been confirmed by vibrational spectroscopy, as indicated by the totally symmetric BeO_{4} mode at 531 cm^{−1}. This band is absent in beryllium sulfate, and the sulfate modes are perturbed. The data support the existence of Be(OH_{2})_{3}OSO_{3}.

The anhydrous compound has a structure similar to that of boron phosphate. The structure contains alternating tetrahedrally coordinated Be and S and each oxygen is 2 coordinate (Be-O-S). The Be-O distance is 156 pm and the S-O distance is 150 pm.

A mixture of beryllium and radium sulfate was used as the neutron source in the discovery of nuclear fission.
