= Beryllium =

Beryllium, _{4}Be
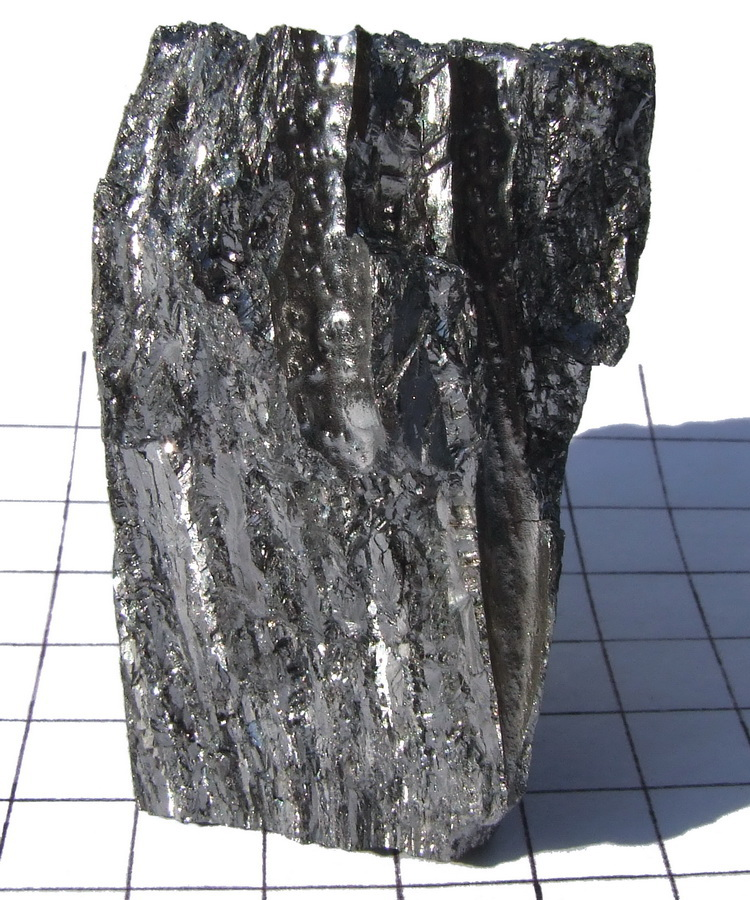

Beryllium
- Pronunciation: /bəˈrɪliəm/ (bə-RIL-ee-əm)
- Appearance: white-gray metallic

Standard atomic weight A_{r}°(Be)
- 9.0121831±0.0000005; 9.0122±0.0001 (abridged)

Beryllium in the periodic table
Hydrogen																															Helium
Lithium	Beryllium																									Boron	Carbon	Nitrogen	Oxygen	Fluorine	Neon
Sodium	Magnesium																									Aluminium	Silicon	Phosphorus	Sulfur	Chlorine	Argon
Potassium	Calcium															Scandium	Titanium	Vanadium	Chromium	Manganese	Iron	Cobalt	Nickel	Copper	Zinc	Gallium	Germanium	Arsenic	Selenium	Bromine	Krypton
Rubidium	Strontium															Yttrium	Zirconium	Niobium	Molybdenum	Technetium	Ruthenium	Rhodium	Palladium	Silver	Cadmium	Indium	Tin	Antimony	Tellurium	Iodine	Xenon
Caesium	Barium	Lanthanum	Cerium	Praseodymium	Neodymium	Promethium	Samarium	Europium	Gadolinium	Terbium	Dysprosium	Holmium	Erbium	Thulium	Ytterbium	Lutetium	Hafnium	Tantalum	Tungsten	Rhenium	Osmium	Iridium	Platinum	Gold	Mercury (element)	Thallium	Lead	Bismuth	Polonium	Astatine	Radon
Francium	Radium	Actinium	Thorium	Protactinium	Uranium	Neptunium	Plutonium	Americium	Curium	Berkelium	Californium	Einsteinium	Fermium	Mendelevium	Nobelium	Lawrencium	Rutherfordium	Dubnium	Seaborgium	Bohrium	Hassium	Meitnerium	Darmstadtium	Roentgenium	Copernicium	Nihonium	Flerovium	Moscovium	Livermorium	Tennessine	Oganesson
–
↑
Be
↓
Mg
lithium ← beryllium → boron
- Atomic number (Z): 4
- Group: group 2 (alkaline earth metals)
- Period: period 2
- Block: s-block
- Electron configuration: [He] 2s^{2}
- Electrons per shell: 2, 2

Physical properties
- Phase at STP: solid
- Melting point: 1560 K (1287 °C, 2349 °F)
- Boiling point: 2742 K (2469 °C, 4476 °F)
- Density (at 20 °C): 1.845 g/cm^{3}
- when liquid (at m.p.): 1.690 g/cm^{3}
- Critical point: 5400 K, 46 MPa (estimated)
- Heat of fusion: 12.2 kJ/mol
- Heat of vaporization: 292 kJ/mol
- Molar heat capacity: 16.443 J/(mol·K)
- Specific heat capacity: 1824.527 J/(kg·K)
Vapor pressure
P (Pa)	1	10	100	1 k	10 k	100 k
at T (K)	1462	1608	1791	2023	2327	2742

Atomic properties
- Oxidation states: common: +2 −2, 0, +1
- Electronegativity: Pauling scale: 1.57
- Ionization energies: 1st: 899.5 kJ/mol; 2nd: 1757.1 kJ/mol; 3rd: 14,848.7 kJ/mol; (more)
- Atomic radius: empirical: 112 pm
- Covalent radius: 96±3 pm
- Van der Waals radius: 153 pm
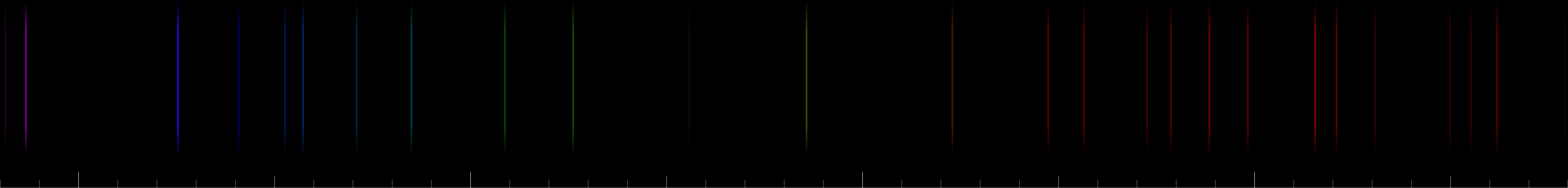
- Spectral lines of beryllium

Other properties
- Natural occurrence: primordial
- Crystal structure: hexagonal close-packed (hcp) (hP2)
- Lattice constants: a = 228.60 pm c = 358.42 pm (at 20 °C)
- Thermal expansion: 10.98×10^{−6}/K (at 20 °C) (Note: The thermal expansion is anisotropic: the parameters (at 20 °C) for each crystal axis are α_{a} = 12.03×10^{−6}/K, α_{c} = 8.88×10^{−6}/K, and α_{average} = α_{V}/3 = 10.98×10^{−6}/K.)
- Thermal conductivity: 200 W/(m⋅K)
- Electrical resistivity: 36 nΩ⋅m (at 20 °C)
- Magnetic ordering: diamagnetic
- Molar magnetic susceptibility: −9.0×10^{−6} cm^{3}/mol
- Young's modulus: 287 GPa
- Shear modulus: 132 GPa
- Bulk modulus: 130 GPa
- Speed of sound thin rod: 12,890 m/s (at r.t.)
- Poisson ratio: 0.032
- Mohs hardness: 6.0
- Vickers hardness: 1670 MPa
- Brinell hardness: 590–1320 MPa
- CAS Number: 7440-41-7

History
- Naming: after mineral Beryl, from Greek βήρυλλος, which referred to various blue-green stones
- Discovery: Louis Nicolas Vauquelin (1798)
- First isolation: Friedrich Wöhler & Antoine Bussy (1828)

Isotopes of beryllium
Main isotopes			Decay	
Isotope	abundance	half-life (t_{1/2})	mode	product
^{7}Be	(unstable)	53.22 d	ε	^{7}Li
^{8}Be	synth	8.2×10^{−17} s (Note: Also can be considered spontaneous fission, as ^{8}Be splits into two equal ^{4}He nuclei)	α	^{4}He
^{9}Be	100%	stable		
^{10}Be	(unstable)	1.387×10^{6} y	β^{−}	^{10}B

Beryllium is a chemical element; it has symbol Be and atomic number 4. It is a steel-gray, hard, strong, lightweight and brittle alkaline earth metal. It is a divalent element that occurs naturally only in combination with other elements to form minerals. Gemstones high in beryllium include beryl (aquamarine, emerald, red beryl) and chrysoberyl. It is a relatively rare element in the universe, usually occurring as a product of the spallation of larger atomic nuclei that have collided with cosmic rays. Within the cores of stars, beryllium is depleted as it is fused into heavier elements. Beryllium constitutes about 0.0004 percent by mass (4 ppm) of Earth's crust. The world's annual beryllium production of 220 tons is usually manufactured by extraction from the mineral beryl, a difficult process because beryllium bonds strongly to oxygen.

In structural applications, the combination of high flexural rigidity, thermal stability, thermal conductivity and low density (1.85 times that of water) make beryllium a desirable aerospace material for aircraft components, missiles, spacecraft, and satellites. Because of its low density and atomic mass, beryllium is relatively transparent to X-rays and other forms of ionizing radiation; therefore, it is the most common window material for X-ray equipment and components of particle detectors. When added as an alloying element to aluminium, copper (notably the alloy beryllium copper), iron, or nickel, beryllium improves many physical properties. For example, tools and components made of beryllium copper alloys are strong and hard and do not create sparks when they strike a steel surface. In air, the surface of beryllium oxidizes readily at room temperature to form a passivation layer 1–10 nm thick that protects it from further oxidation and corrosion. The metal oxidizes in bulk (beyond the passivation layer) when heated above 500 °C (932 °F), and burns brilliantly when heated to about 2,500 °C (4,530 °F).

The commercial use of beryllium requires the use of appropriate dust control equipment and industrial controls at all times, because inhaled beryllium-containing dusts is toxic, and can cause berylliosis, a chronic life-threatening allergic disease, in some people. Berylliosis is typically manifested by chronic pulmonary fibrosis and, in severe cases, right-sided heart failure and death.

== Characteristics ==
=== Physical properties ===
Beryllium is a steel gray and hard metal that is brittle at room temperature and has a close-packed hexagonal crystal structure. It has exceptional stiffness (Young's modulus 287 GPa) and a melting point of 1287 °C. The modulus of elasticity of beryllium is approximately 35% greater than that of steel. The combination of this modulus and a relatively low density results in an unusually high sound conduction speed in beryllium – about 12.9 km/s at ambient conditions. Among all metals, beryllium dissipates the most heat per unit weight, with both high specific heat (1925 J·kg^{−1}·K^{−1}) and thermal conductivity (216 W·m^{−1}·K^{−1}). Beryllium's conductivity and relatively low coefficient of linear thermal expansion (11.4×10^{−6} K^{−1}) make it uniquely stable under extreme temperature differences.

=== Nuclear properties ===
Naturally occurring beryllium, save for slight contamination by the radioisotopes created by cosmic rays, is isotopically pure beryllium-9, which has a nuclear spin of 3/2^{−}. The inelastic scattering cross section of beryllium increases with relation to neutron energy, allowing for significant slowing of higher-energy neutrons. Therefore, it works as a neutron reflector and neutron moderator; the exact strength of neutron slowing depends on the purity and size of the crystallites in the material.

The isotope ^{9}Be can undergo a (n, 2n) neutron reaction with fast neutrons, to produce ^{8}Be, which almost immediately breaks into two alpha particles. Thus, for high-energy neutrons, beryllium is a neutron multiplier, releasing more neutrons than it absorbs. This nuclear reaction is:

^{9}_{4}Be + n → 2 ^{4}_{2}He + 2 n

The isotope can liberate the neutron when struck by an alpha particle. The nuclear reaction

^{9}_{4}Be + ^{4}_{2}He → ^{12}_{6}C + n

is strongly exothermic, liberating a fast neutron.

The isotope can also release the neutron when absorbing a gamma ray of sufficient energy (photodisintegration) at a useful cross-section:

^{9}_{4}Be + gamma → 2 ^{4}_{2}He + n

Thus, natural beryllium bombarded by alpha or gamma radiation from a suitable radioisotope is the most common radioisotope-powered neutron source for laboratory use.

Finally, small amounts of tritium are also liberated by the high-energy neutrons in the three-step nuclear reaction

^{9}_{4}Be + n → ^{4}_{2}He + ^{6}_{2}He, ^{6}_{2}He → ^{6}_{3}Li + β^{−}, ^{6}_{3}Li + n → ^{4}_{2}He + ^{3}_{1}H

^{6}_{2}He has a half-life of only 0.8 seconds, β^{−} is an electron, and ^{6}_{3}Li has a high neutron absorption cross section. This is equivalent to the neutron-multiplication reaction with three output neutrons replaced by a triton, and a beta decay allowing that conversion. Tritium is a radioisotope of concern in nuclear reactor waste streams.

=== Optical properties ===
As a metal, beryllium is transparent or translucent to most wavelengths of X-rays and gamma rays, making it useful for the output windows of X-ray tubes and other such apparatus.

=== Isotopes and nucleosynthesis ===
Natural beryllium is made up of solely the stable isotope beryllium-9. Beryllium is the only monoisotopic element with an even atomic number.

Beryllium-7 and beryllium-8 are key intermediates in stellar nucleosynthesis, but do not last long. It is believed that the beryllium in the universe was created in the interstellar medium when cosmic rays induced fission in heavier elements found in interstellar gas and dust, a process called cosmic ray spallation.

About one billionth (10^{−9}) of the primordial atoms created in the Big Bang nucleosynthesis were ^{7}Be. This is a consequence of the low density of matter when the temperature of the universe cooled enough for small nuclei to be stable. Creating such nuclei requires nuclear collisions that are rare at low density. Although ^{7}Be is unstable and decays by electron capture into ^{7}Li, with a half-life of 53.22 days under standard conditions, in the early universe the atoms were fully ionized and electron capture not significant. The conversion of ^{7}Be to Li was only complete near the time of recombination.

The isotope ^{7}Be is also a cosmogenic nuclide and shows an atmospheric abundance inversely proportional to solar activity. It decays exclusively by electron capture, and the 2s electrons of beryllium are the valence electrons responsible for chemical bonding. Therefore, when ^{7}Be decays by L-electron capture, it does so by taking electrons from its atomic orbitals that may be participating in bonding. This makes its decay rate dependent to a measurable degree upon its chemical surroundings – a rare occurrence in nuclear decay.

^{7}Be is also produced in cooling water of high-energy accelerators; it can be extracted from the water at high purity and sold for scientific experiments.

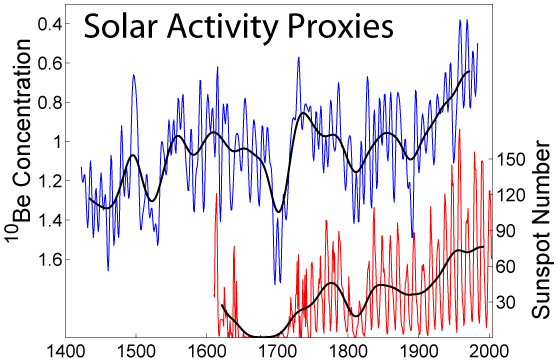
Plot showing variations in solar activity, including variation in sunspot number (red) and ^{10}Be concentration (blue). Note that the beryllium scale is inverted, so increases on this scale indicate lower ^{10}Be levels

The isotope ^{10}Be is similarly cosmogenic, and is produced in the same way – by cosmic ray spallation of nitrogen and oxygen. Its behavior differs only because of its much longer half-life of 1.387 million years. It entirely accumulates at the soil surface and has a long residence time before decaying to boron-10. Thus, ^{10}Be and its daughter product are used to examine natural soil erosion, soil formation and the development of lateritic soils, and as a proxy for measurement of the variations in solar activity and the age of ice cores. As with ^{7}Be, production of ^{10}Be is inversely related to solar activity, because increased solar wind during periods of high solar activity decreases the flux of galactic cosmic rays that reach the Earth. Nuclear explosions also form ^{10}Be by the reaction of fast neutrons with ^{13}C in the carbon dioxide in air. This is one of the indicators of past activity at nuclear weapon test sites.

^{8}Be is unstable but has a ground state resonance with an important role in the triple-alpha process in stellar helium burning. As first proposed by British astronomer Sir Fred Hoyle based solely on astrophysical analysis, the energy levels of ^{8}Be and ^{12}C allow carbon nucleosynthesis by increasing the effective cross-section between the three alpha particles in the carbon production process. The main carbon-producing reaction in the universe is
$$^4\textrm{He}\  +\  ^8\textrm{Be} \rightarrow\ ^{12}\textrm{C} + \gamma$$
where ^{4}He is an alpha particle.

The exotic isotopes ^{11}Be and ^{14}Be are known to exhibit a nuclear halo. That is, their nuclei have, respectively, 1 and 4 neutrons orbiting substantially outside the expected nuclear radius and in each case the core the neutrons float around is one of ^{10}Be.

== Occurrence ==
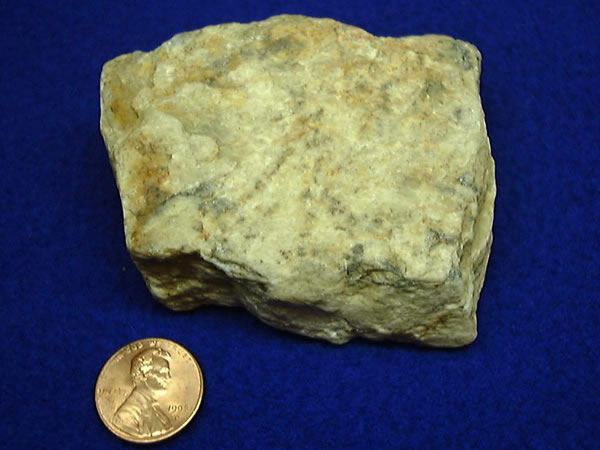
Beryllium ore with a U.S. penny for scale

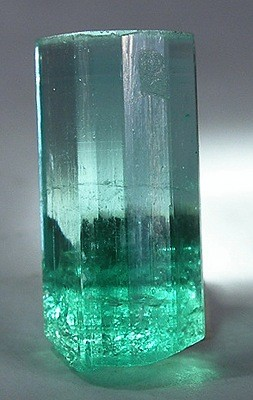
Emerald is a naturally occurring compound of beryllium.

Beryllium is found in over 100 minerals, but most are uncommon to rare. The more common beryllium-containing minerals include: bertrandite (Be_{4}Si_{2}O_{7}(OH)_{2}), beryl (Al_{2}Be_{3}Si_{6}O_{18}), chrysoberyl (Al_{2}BeO_{4}) and phenakite (Be_{2}SiO_{4}). Precious forms of beryl are aquamarine, red beryl and emerald. The green color in gem-quality forms of beryl comes from varying amounts of chromium (about 2% for emerald).

The two main ores of beryllium, beryl and bertrandite, are found in Argentina, Brazil, India, Madagascar, Russia and the United States. Total world reserves of beryllium ore are greater than 400,000 tonnes.

=== Abundance ===
The Sun has a concentration of 0.1 parts per billion (ppb) of beryllium. Beryllium has a concentration of 2 to 6 parts per million (ppm) in the Earth's crust and is the 47th-most abundant element. It is most concentrated (6 ppm) in the soils. Trace amounts of ^{9}Be are found in the Earth's atmosphere. The concentration of beryllium in sea water is 0.2–0.6 parts per trillion. In stream water, however, beryllium is more abundant, with a concentration of 0.1 ppb.

== Extraction ==
Beryllium production

The extraction of beryllium from its compounds is a difficult process due to its high affinity for oxygen at elevated temperatures, and its ability to reduce water when its oxide film is removed. Currently the United States, China and Kazakhstan are the only three countries involved in the industrial-scale extraction of beryllium. Kazakhstan produces beryllium from a concentrate stockpiled before the breakup of the Soviet Union around 1991. This resource had become nearly depleted by the mid-2010s.

Production of beryllium in Russia was halted in 1997, and is planned to be resumed in the 2020s. In August 2026, President Vladimir Putin launched the Yermakovsky Mining and Processing Plant in the Kizhinginsky District of Buryatia. The project is scheduled for completion by 2028, with an expected beryllium ore processing capacity of 30,000 tons.

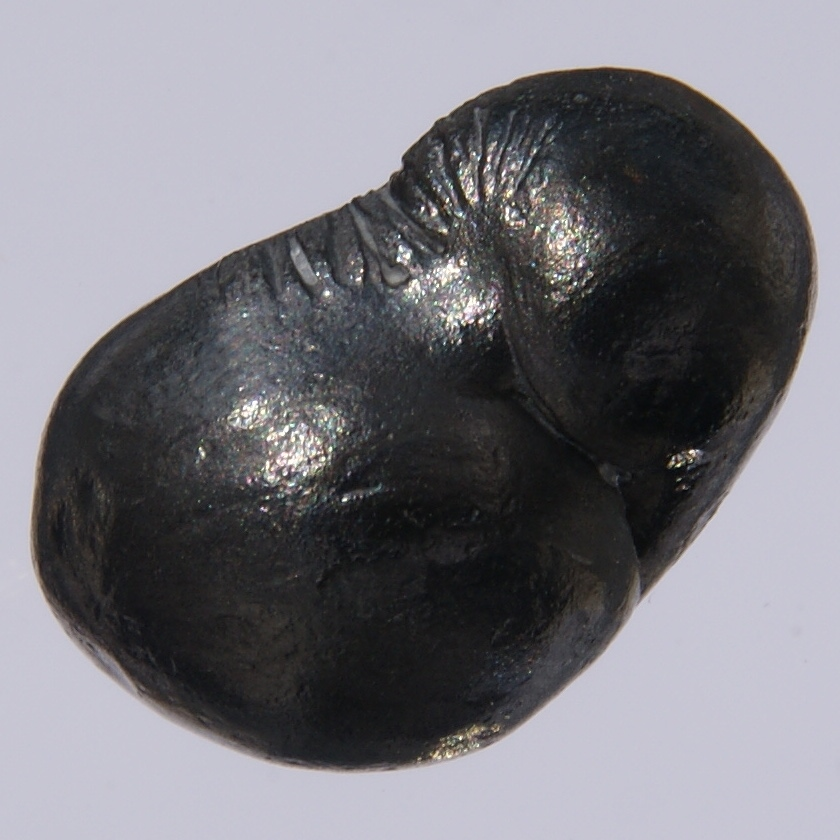
A bead of beryllium from a melt

Beryllium is most commonly extracted from the mineral beryl, which is either sintered using an extraction agent or melted into a soluble mixture. The sintering process involves mixing beryl with sodium fluorosilicate and soda at 770 °C (1,420 °F) to form sodium fluoroberyllate, aluminium oxide and silicon dioxide. Beryllium hydroxide is precipitated from a solution of sodium fluoroberyllate and sodium hydroxide in water. The extraction of beryllium using the melt method involves grinding beryl into a powder and heating it to 1,650 °C (3,000 °F). The melt is quickly cooled with water and then reheated 250 to 300 °C (482 to 572 °F) in concentrated sulfuric acid, mostly yielding beryllium sulfate and aluminium sulfate. Aqueous ammonia is then used to remove the aluminium and sulfur, leaving beryllium hydroxide.

Beryllium hydroxide created using either the sinter or melt method is then converted into beryllium fluoride or beryllium chloride. To form the fluoride, aqueous ammonium hydrogen fluoride is added to beryllium hydroxide to yield a precipitate of ammonium tetrafluoroberyllate, which is heated to 1,000 °C (1,830 °F) to form beryllium fluoride. Heating the fluoride to 900 °C (1,650 °F) with magnesium forms finely divided beryllium, and additional heating to 1,300 °C (2,370 °F) creates the compact metal. Heating beryllium hydroxide forms beryllium oxide, which becomes beryllium chloride when combined with carbon and chlorine. Electrolysis of molten beryllium chloride is then used to obtain the metal.

== Chemical properties ==
A beryllium atom has the electronic configuration [He] 2s^{2}. The predominant oxidation state of beryllium is +2; the beryllium atom losing both of its valence electrons. Beryllium's chemical behavior is largely a result of its small atomic and ionic radii. It thus has very high ionization potentials and does not form divalent cations. Instead it forms two covalent bonds with a tendency to polymerize, as in solid BeCl_{2}. Its chemistry has similarities to that of aluminium, an example of a diagonal relationship. In the other direction, beryllium is attracted to electron density, generating intermolecular forces similar to hydrogen bonding.

At room temperature, the surface of beryllium forms a 1−10 nm-thick oxide passivation layer that prevents further reactions with air, except for gradual thickening of the oxide up to about 25 nm. When heated above about 500 °C, oxidation into the bulk metal progresses along grain boundaries. Once the metal is ignited in air by heating above the oxide melting point around 2500 °C, beryllium burns brilliantly, forming a mixture of beryllium oxide and beryllium nitride. Beryllium dissolves readily in non-oxidizing acids, such as HCl and diluted H_{2}SO_{4}, but not in nitric acid or water as this forms the oxide. This behavior is similar to that of aluminium. Beryllium also dissolves and reacts with alkali solutions.

Binary compounds of beryllium(II) are polymeric in the solid state. BeF_{2} has a silica-like structure with corner-shared BeF_{4} tetrahedra. BeCl_{2} and BeBr_{2} have chain structures with edge-shared tetrahedra. Beryllium oxide, BeO, is a white refractory solid which has a wurtzite crystal structure and a thermal conductivity as high as some metals. BeO is amphoteric. Beryllium sulfide, selenide and telluride are known, all having the zincblende structure. Beryllium nitride, Be_{3}N_{2}, is a high-melting-point compound which is readily hydrolyzed. Beryllium azide, BeN_{6} is known and beryllium phosphide, Be_{3}P_{2} has a similar structure to Be_{3}N_{2}. A number of beryllium borides are known, such as Be_{5}B, Be_{4}B, Be_{2}B, BeB_{2}, BeB_{6} and BeB_{12}. Beryllium carbide, Be_{2}C, is a refractory brick-red compound that reacts with water to give methane. Beryllium silicides have been identified in the form of variously sized nanoclusters, formed through a spontaneous reaction between pure beryllium and silicon. The halides BeX_{2} (X = F, Cl, Br, and I) have a linear monomeric molecular structure in the gas phase.

Lower oxidation states complexes of beryllium are exceedingly rare. For example, a stable complex with a Be-Be bond, which formally features beryllium in the +1 oxidation state, has been described. Beryllium in the 0 oxidation state is also known in a complex with a Mg-Be bond.

=== Aqueous solutions ===
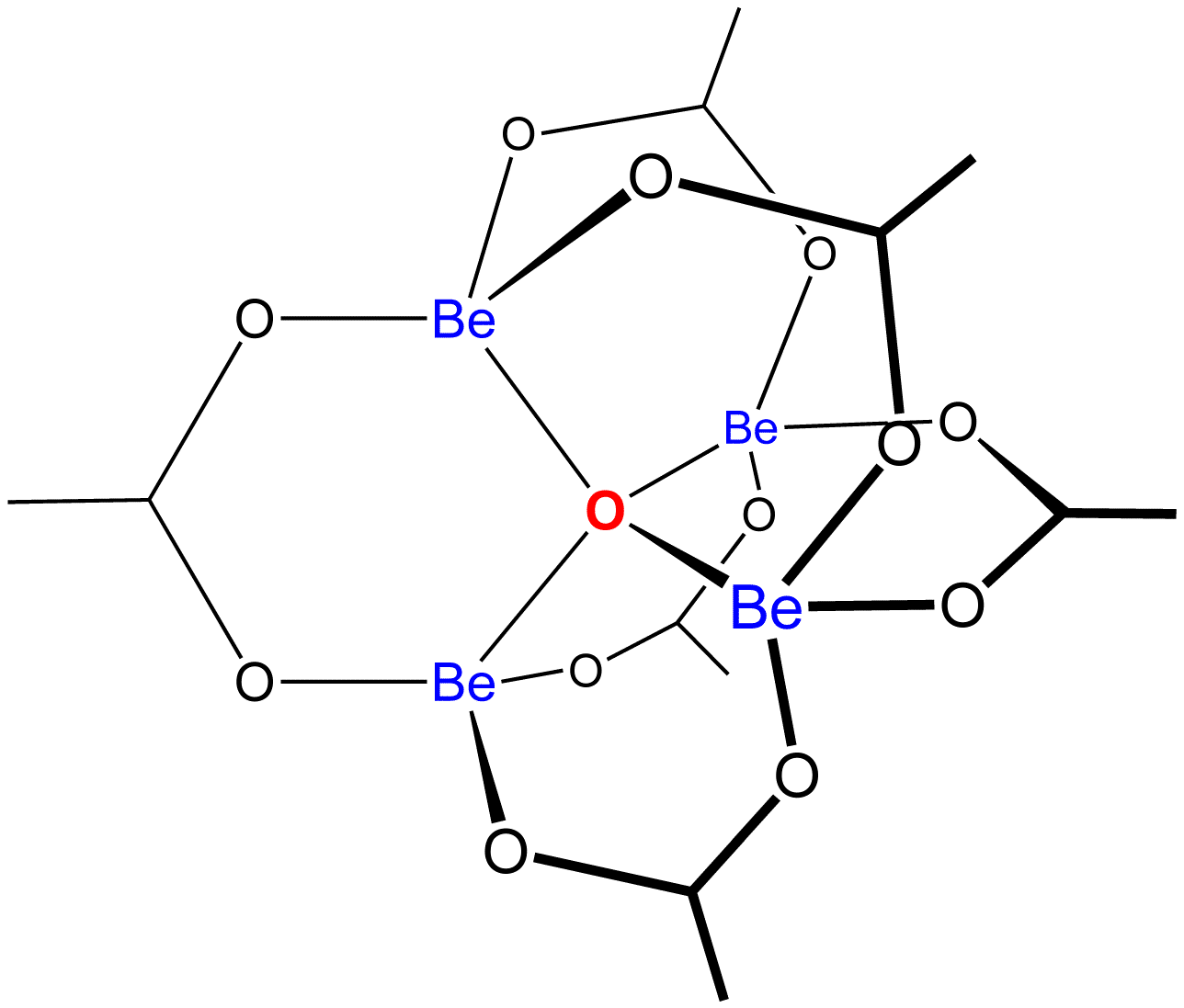
Schematic structure of basic beryllium acetate

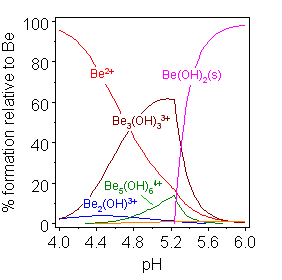
Beryllium hydrolysis. Water molecules attached to Be are omitted in this diagram

Structure of the trimeric hydrolysis product of beryllium(II)

Solutions of beryllium salts, such as beryllium sulfate and beryllium nitrate, are acidic because of hydrolysis of the [Be(H_{2}O)_{4}]^{2+} ion. The concentration of the first hydrolysis product, [Be(H_{2}O)_{3}(OH)]^{+}, is less than 1% of the beryllium concentration. The most stable hydrolysis product is the trimeric ion [Be_{3}(OH)_{3}(H_{2}O)_{6}]^{3+}. Beryllium hydroxide, Be(OH)_{2}, is insoluble in water at pH 5 or more. Consequently, beryllium compounds are generally insoluble at biological pH. Because of this, inhalation of beryllium metal dust leads to the development of the fatal condition of berylliosis. Be(OH)_{2} dissolves in strongly alkaline solutions.

Beryllium(II) forms few complexes with monodentate ligands because the water molecules in the aquo-ion, [Be(H_{2}O)_{4}]^{2+} are bound very strongly to the beryllium ion. Notable exceptions are the series of water-soluble complexes with the fluoride ion:

[Be(H_{2}O)_{4}]^{2+} + n F^{−} ⇌ Be[(H_{2}O)_{2−n}F_{n}]^{2−} + n H_{2}O

Beryllium(II) forms many complexes with bidentate ligands containing oxygen-donor atoms. The species [Be_{3}O(H_{2}PO_{4})_{6}]^{2−} is notable for having a 3-coordinate oxide ion at its center. Basic beryllium acetate, Be_{4}O(OAc)_{6}, has an oxide ion surrounded by a tetrahedron of beryllium atoms.

With organic ligands, such as the malonate ion, the acid deprotonates when forming the complex. The donor atoms are two oxygens.

H_{2}A + [Be(H_{2}O)_{4}]^{2+} ⇌ [BeA(H_{2}O)_{2}] + 2 H^{+} + 2 H_{2}O
H_{2}A + [BeA(H_{2}O)_{2}] ⇌ [BeA_{2}]^{2−} + 2 H^{+} + 2 H_{2}O

The formation of a complex is in competition with the metal ion-hydrolysis reaction and mixed complexes with both the anion and the hydroxide ion are also formed. For example, derivatives of the cyclic trimer are known, with a bidentate ligand replacing one or more pairs of water molecules.

Aliphatic hydroxycarboxylic acids such as glycolic acid form rather weak monodentate complexes in solution, in which the hydroxyl group remains intact. In the solid state, the hydroxyl group may deprotonate: a hexamer, Na_{4}[Be_{6}(OCH_{2}(O)O)_{6}], was isolated long ago. Aromatic hydroxy ligands (i.e. phenols) form relatively strong complexes. For example, log K_{1} and log K_{2} values of 12.2 and 9.3 have been reported for complexes with tiron.

Beryllium has generally a rather poor affinity for ammine ligands. There are many early reports of complexes with amino acids, but unfortunately they are not reliable as the concomitant hydrolysis reactions were not understood at the time of publication. Values for log β of ca. 6 to 7 have been reported. The degree of formation is small because of competition with hydrolysis reactions.

=== Organic chemistry ===
Organometallic beryllium compounds are known to be highly reactive. Examples of known organoberyllium compounds are dineopentylberyllium, beryllocene (Cp_{2}Be), diallylberyllium (by exchange reaction of diethyl beryllium with triallyl boron), bis(1,3-trimethylsilylallyl)beryllium, Be(mes)_{2}, and (beryllium(I) complex) diberyllocene. Ligands can also be aryls and alkynyls.

== History ==
The mineral beryl, which contains beryllium, has been used at least since the Ptolemaic dynasty of Egypt. The Papyrus Graecus Holmiensis, written in the third or fourth century CE, contains notes on how to prepare artificial emerald and beryl.

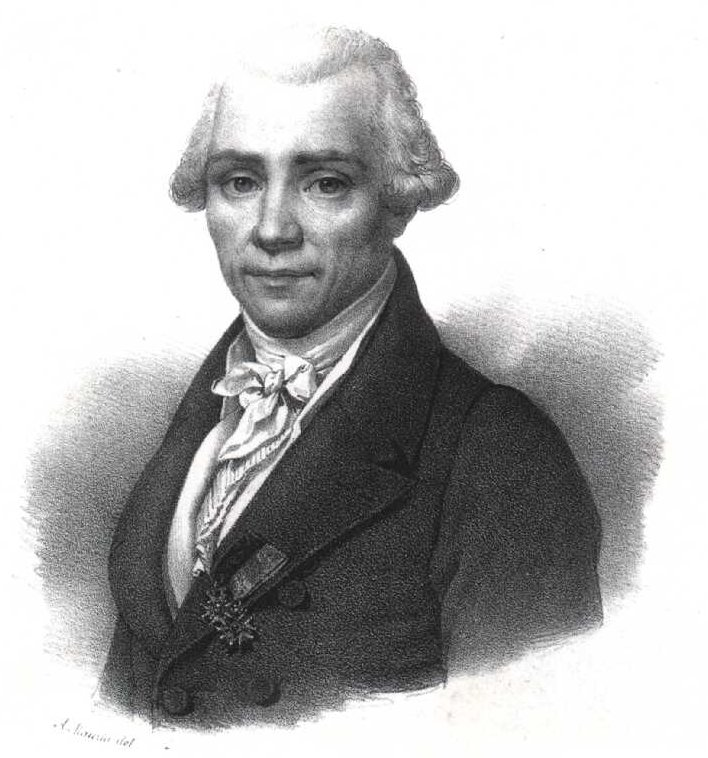
Louis-Nicolas Vauquelin discovered beryllium

Early analyses of emeralds and beryls by Martin Heinrich Klaproth, Torbern Olof Bergman, Franz Karl Achard, and Johann Jakob Bindheim always yielded similar elements, leading to the mistaken conclusion that both substances are aluminium silicates. Mineralogist René Just Haüy discovered that both crystals are geometrically identical, and he asked chemist Louis-Nicolas Vauquelin for a chemical analysis.

In a 1798 paper read before the Institut de France, Vauquelin reported that he found a new "earth" by dissolving aluminium hydroxide from emerald and beryl in an additional alkali. The editors of the journal Annales de chimie et de physique named the new earth "glucine" for the sweet taste of some of its compounds. The name beryllium was first used by Friedrich Wöhler in 1828. Both beryllium and glucinum were used concurrently until 1949, when the IUPAC adopted beryllium as the standard name of the element.

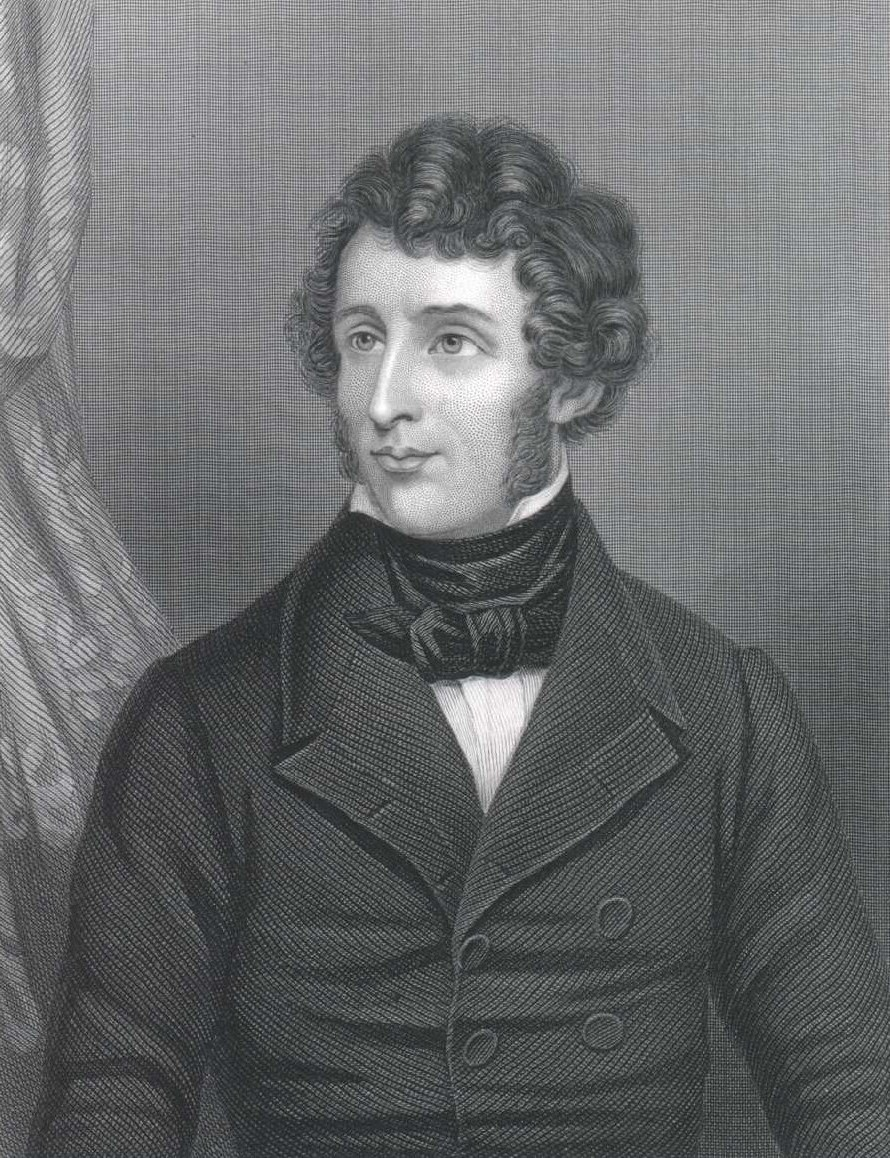
Friedrich Wöhler was one of the men who independently isolated beryllium

Friedrich Wöhler and Antoine Bussy independently isolated beryllium in 1828 by the chemical reaction of metallic potassium with beryllium chloride, as follows:

BeCl_{2} + 2 K → 2 KCl + Be

Using an alcohol lamp, Wöhler heated alternating layers of beryllium chloride and potassium in a wired-shut platinum crucible. The above reaction immediately took place and caused the crucible to become white hot. Upon cooling and washing the resulting gray-black powder, he saw that it was made of fine particles with a dark metallic luster. The highly reactive potassium had been produced by the electrolysis of its compounds. He did not succeed in melting the beryllium particles.

The process of producing beryllium was prohibitively expensive at the start of the 20th century. This changed once a cost effective process for extracting beryllium from beryl ore. In 1920, the price of producing a pound of beryllium was $5,000, but by 1931, it was $50.

The direct electrolysis of a molten mixture of beryllium fluoride and sodium fluoride by Paul Lebeau in 1898 resulted in the first pure (99.5 to 99.8%) samples of beryllium. However, industrial production started only after the First World War. The original industrial involvement included subsidiaries and scientists related to the Union Carbide and Carbon Corporation in Cleveland, Ohio, and Siemens & Halske AG in Berlin. In the US, the process was ruled by Hugh S. Cooper, director of The Kemet Laboratories Company. In Germany, the first commercially successful process for producing beryllium was developed in 1921 by Alfred Stock and Hans Goldschmidt.

A sample of beryllium was bombarded with alpha rays from the decay of radium in a 1932 experiment by James Chadwick that uncovered the existence of the neutron. This same method is used in one class of radioisotope-based laboratory neutron sources that produce 30 neutrons for every million α particles.

Beryllium production saw a rapid increase during World War II due to the rising demand for hard beryllium-copper alloys and phosphors for fluorescent lights. Most early fluorescent lamps used zinc orthosilicate with varying content of beryllium to emit greenish light. Small additions of magnesium tungstate improved the blue part of the spectrum to yield an acceptable white light. Halophosphate-based phosphors replaced beryllium-based phosphors after beryllium was found to be toxic.

Electrolysis of a mixture of beryllium fluoride and sodium fluoride was used to isolate beryllium during the 19th century. The metal's high melting point makes this process more energy-consuming than corresponding processes used for the alkali metals. Early in the 20th century, the production of beryllium by the thermal decomposition of beryllium iodide was investigated following the success of a similar process for the production of zirconium, but this process proved to be uneconomical for volume production.

Pure beryllium metal did not become readily available until 1957, even though it had been used as an alloying metal to harden and toughen copper much earlier. Beryllium could be produced by reducing beryllium compounds such as beryllium chloride with metallic potassium or sodium. Currently, most beryllium is produced by reducing beryllium fluoride with magnesium. The price on the American market for vacuum-cast beryllium ingots was about $338 per pound ($745 per kilogram) in 2001.

Between 1998 and 2008, the world's production of beryllium had decreased from 343 to about 200 tonnes. It then increased to 230 metric tons by 2018, of which 170 tonnes came from the United States.

=== Etymology ===
Beryllium was named for the semiprecious mineral beryl, from which it was first isolated. Martin Klaproth, having independently determined that beryl and emerald share an element, preferred the name "beryllina" due to the fact that yttria also formed sweet salts.

Although Humphry Davy failed to isolate it, he proposed the name glucium for the new metal, derived from the name glucina for the earth it was found in; altered forms of this name, glucinium or glucinum (symbol Gl) continued to be used into the 20th century.

== Applications ==
=== Radiation windows ===
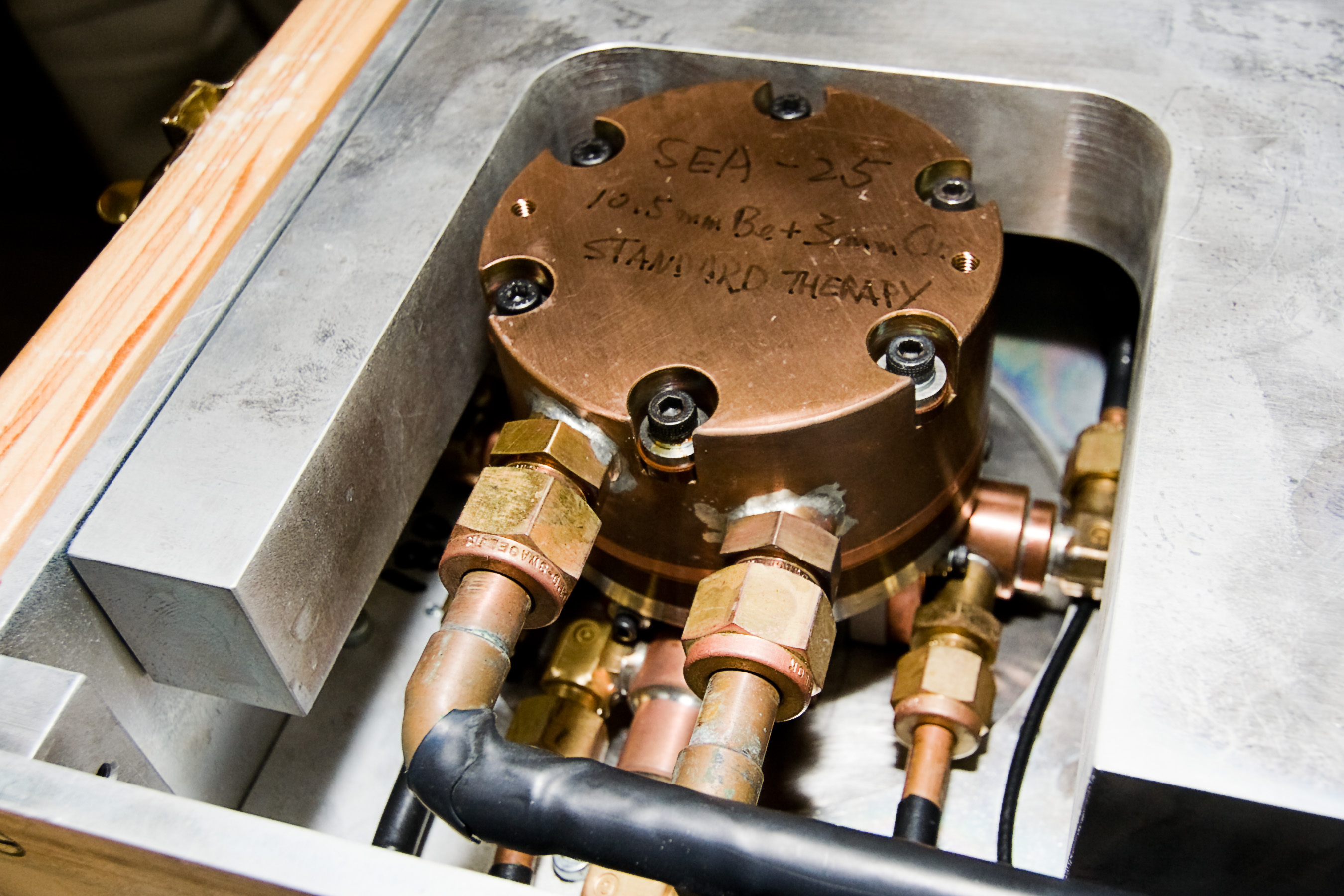
Beryllium target which converts a proton beam into a neutron beam

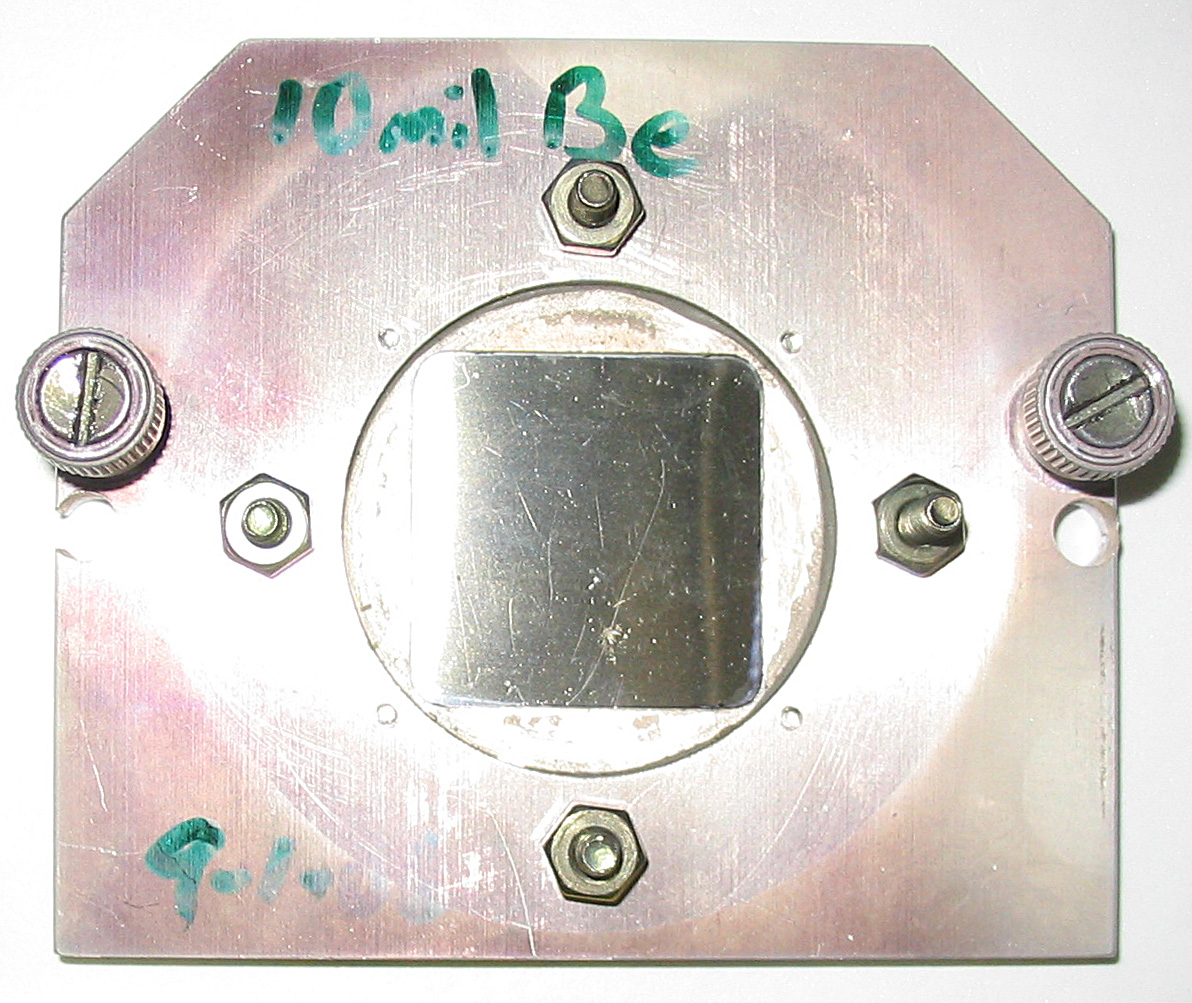
A square beryllium foil mounted in a steel case to be used as a window between a vacuum chamber and an X-ray microscope. Beryllium is highly transparent to X-rays owing to its low atomic number.

Because of its low atomic number and very low absorption for X-rays, the oldest and still one of the most important applications of beryllium is in radiation windows for X-ray tubes. Extreme demands are placed on purity and cleanliness of beryllium to avoid artifacts in the X-ray images. Beryllium is used in X-ray windows because it is transparent to X-rays, allowing for clearer and more efficient imaging. Thin beryllium foils are used as radiation windows for X-ray detectors, and their extremely low absorption minimizes the heating effects caused by high-intensity, low energy X-rays typical of synchrotron radiation. Vacuum-tight windows and beam-tubes for radiation experiments on synchrotrons are manufactured exclusively from beryllium. In scientific setups for various X-ray emission studies (e.g., energy-dispersive X-ray spectroscopy) the sample holder is usually made of beryllium because its emitted X-rays have much lower energies (≈100 eV) than X-rays from most studied materials.

Low atomic number also makes beryllium relatively transparent to energetic particles. Therefore, it is used to build the beam pipe around the collision region in particle physics setups, such as all four main detector experiments at the Large Hadron Collider (ALICE, ATLAS, CMS, LHCb), the Tevatron and at SLAC. The low density of beryllium allows collision products to reach the surrounding detectors without significant interaction, its stiffness allows a powerful vacuum to be produced within the pipe to minimize interaction with gases, its thermal stability allows it to function correctly at temperatures of only a few degrees above absolute zero, and its diamagnetic nature keeps it from interfering with the complex multipole magnet systems used to steer and focus the particle beams.

=== Mechanical applications ===
Because of its stiffness, light weight and dimensional stability over a wide temperature range, beryllium metal is used for lightweight structural components in the defense and aerospace industries in high-speed aircraft, guided missiles, spacecraft, and satellites, including the James Webb Space Telescope. Several liquid-fuel rockets have used rocket nozzles made of pure beryllium. The high elastic stiffness of beryllium has led to its extensive use in precision instrumentation, e.g. in inertial guidance systems and in the support mechanisms for optical systems. Beryllium powder was itself studied as a rocket fuel, but this use has never materialized. A small number of extreme high-end bicycle frames have been built with beryllium. From 1998 to 2000, the McLaren Formula One team used Mercedes-Benz engines with beryllium–aluminium alloy pistons. The use of beryllium engine components was banned following a protest by Scuderia Ferrari. An earlier major application of beryllium was in brakes for military airplanes because of its hardness, high melting point, and exceptional ability to dissipate heat. Environmental considerations have led to substitution by other materials.

==== Alloys ====
Mixing about 2.0% beryllium into copper forms an alloy called beryllium copper that is six times stronger than copper alone. Beryllium alloys are used in many applications because of their combination of elasticity, high electrical conductivity and thermal conductivity, high strength and hardness, nonmagnetic properties, as well as good corrosion and fatigue resistance. These applications include non-sparking tools that are used near flammable gases (beryllium nickel), springs, membranes (beryllium nickel and beryllium iron) used in surgical instruments, and high temperature devices. As little as 50 parts per million of beryllium alloyed with liquid magnesium leads to a significant increase in oxidation resistance and decrease in flammability.

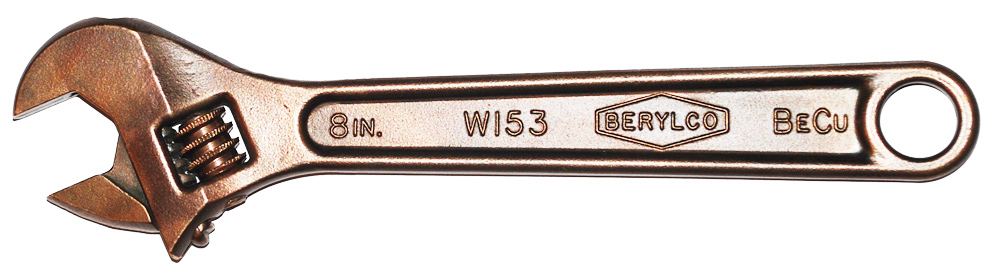
Beryllium copper adjustable wrench

Beryllium-copper alloys were also applied as a hardening agent in "Jason pistols", which were used to strip the paint from the hulls of ships.

Beryllium–copper alloys are also widely used in modern aerospace and defense applications, particularly in high-performance electrical connectors, battery safety fuses, and microswitches that require a balance of conductivity, corrosion resistance, and fatigue strength.

A metal matrix composite material combining beryllium with aluminium developed under the trade name AlBeMet for the high performance aerospace industry has low weight but four times the stiffness of aluminum alone.

=== Mirrors ===
Large-area beryllium mirrors, frequently with a honeycomb support structure, are used, for example, in meteorological satellites where low weight and long-term dimensional stability are critical. Smaller beryllium mirrors are used in optical guidance systems and in fire-control systems, e.g. in the German-made Leopard 1 and Leopard 2 main battle tanks. In these systems, very rapid movement of the mirror is required, which again dictates low mass and high rigidity. Usually the beryllium mirror is coated with hard electroless nickel plating which can be more easily polished to a finer optical finish than beryllium. In some applications, the beryllium blank is polished without any coating. This is particularly applicable to cryogenic operation where thermal expansion mismatch can cause the coating to buckle.

The James Webb Space Telescope has 18 hexagonal beryllium sections for its mirrors, each plated with a thin layer of gold. Because JWST will face a temperature of 33 K, the mirror is made of gold-plated beryllium, which is capable of handling extreme cold better than glass. Beryllium contracts and deforms less than glass and remains more uniform in such temperatures. For the same reason, the optics of the Spitzer Space Telescope are entirely built of beryllium metal.

=== Magnetic applications ===
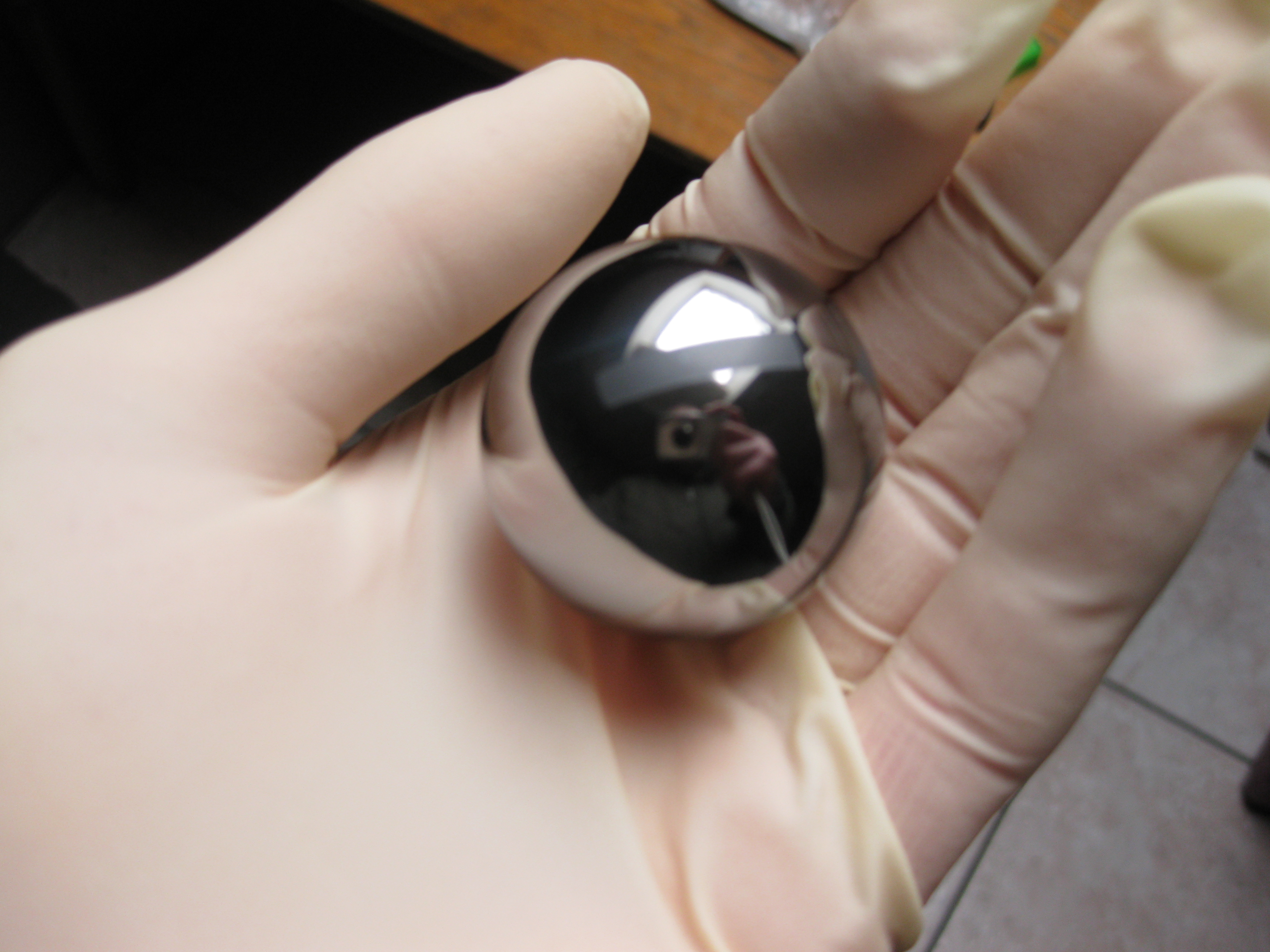
A hollow beryllium sphere used in a gyrocompass of the Boeing B-52 Stratofortress aircraft

Beryllium is non-magnetic. Therefore, tools fabricated out of beryllium-based materials are used by naval or military explosive ordnance disposal teams for work on or near naval mines, since these mines commonly have magnetic fuzes. They are also found in maintenance and construction materials near magnetic resonance imaging (MRI) machines because of the high magnetic fields generated.

=== Nuclear applications ===
High purity beryllium can be used in nuclear reactors as a moderator, reflector, or as cladding on fuel elements. Thin plates or foils of beryllium are sometimes used in nuclear weapon designs as the very outer layer of the plutonium pits in the primary stages of thermonuclear bombs, placed to surround the fissile material. These layers of beryllium are good "pushers" for the implosion of the plutonium-239, and they are good neutron reflectors, just as in beryllium-moderated nuclear reactors.

Beryllium is commonly used in some neutron sources in laboratory devices in which relatively few neutrons are needed (rather than having to use a nuclear reactor or a particle accelerator-powered neutron generator). For this purpose, beryllium-9 is mixed with a source of alpha particles such as polonium-210, radium-226, plutonium-238, or americium-241. In the nuclear reaction that occurs, a beryllium nucleus is transmuted into carbon-12, and one free neutron is emitted, traveling in about the same direction as the alpha particle was heading. Such alpha decay-driven beryllium neutron sources, named "urchin" neutron initiators, were used in some early atomic bombs. Neutron sources in which beryllium is bombarded with gamma rays from a gamma decay radioisotope are also used to produce laboratory neutrons.

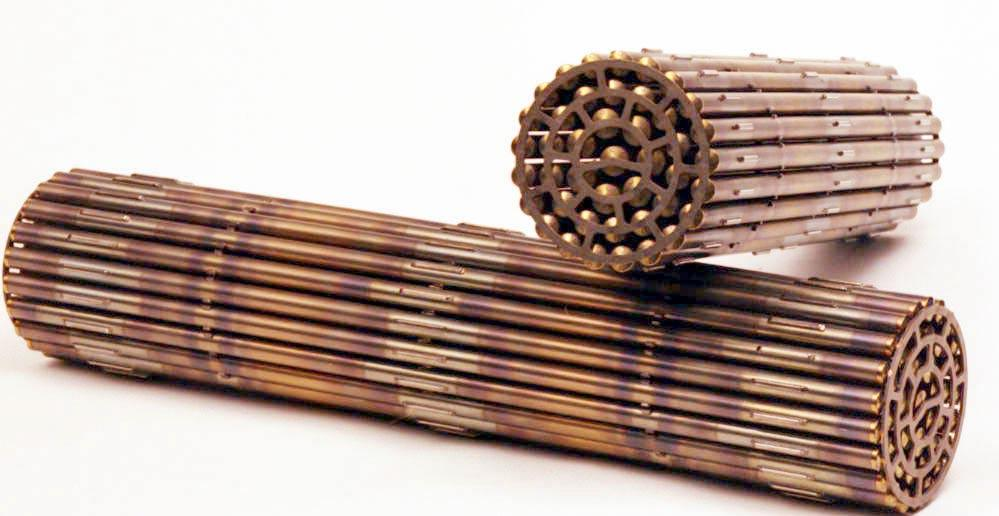
Two CANDU fuel bundles: Each about 50 cm in length and 10 cm in diameter. Notice the small appendages on the fuel clad surfaces

Beryllium is used in fuel fabrication for CANDU reactors. The fuel elements have small appendages that are resistance brazed to the fuel cladding using an induction brazing process with Be as the braze filler material. Bearing pads are brazed in place to prevent contact between the fuel bundle and the pressure tube containing it, and inter-element spacer pads are brazed on to prevent element to element contact.

Beryllium is used at the Joint European Torus nuclear-fusion research laboratory, and it will be used in the more advanced ITER to condition the components which face the plasma. Beryllium has been proposed as a cladding material for nuclear fuel rods, because of its good combination of mechanical, chemical, and nuclear properties. Beryllium fluoride is one of the constituent salts of the eutectic salt mixture FLiBe, which is used as a solvent, moderator and coolant in many hypothetical molten salt reactor designs, including the liquid fluoride thorium reactor (LFTR).

=== Acoustics ===
The low weight and high rigidity of beryllium make it useful as a material for high-frequency speaker drivers. Because beryllium is expensive (many times more than titanium), hard to shape due to its brittleness, and toxic if mishandled, beryllium tweeters are limited to high-end home, pro audio, and public address applications. Some high-fidelity products have been fraudulently claimed to be made of the material.

Beryllium was used for cantilevers in high-performance phonograph cartridge styli, where its extreme stiffness and low density allowed for tracking weights to be reduced to 1 gram while still tracking high frequency passages with minimal distortion.

In sound amplification systems, the speed at which sound travels directly affects the resonant frequency of the amplifier, thereby influencing the range of audible high-frequency sounds. Beryllium stands out due to its exceptionally high speed of sound propagation compared to other metals. This unique property allows beryllium to achieve higher resonant frequencies, making it an ideal material for use as a diaphragm in high-quality loudspeakers.

=== Electronics ===
Beryllium is a p-type dopant in III-V compound semiconductors. It is widely used in materials such as GaAs, AlGaAs, InGaAs and InAlAs grown by molecular-beam epitaxy (MBE). Cross-rolled beryllium sheet is an excellent structural support for printed circuit boards in surface-mount technology. In critical electronic applications, beryllium is both a structural support and heat sink. The application also requires a coefficient of thermal expansion that is well matched to the alumina and polyimide-glass substrates. The beryllium-beryllium oxide composite "E-Materials" have been specially designed for these electronic applications and have the additional advantage that the thermal expansion coefficient can be tailored to match diverse substrate materials.

Beryllium oxide is useful for many applications that require the combined properties of an electrical insulator and an excellent heat conductor, with high strength and hardness and a very high melting point. Beryllium oxide is frequently used as an insulator base plate in high-power transistors in radio frequency transmitters for telecommunications. Beryllium oxide is being studied for use in increasing the thermal conductivity of uranium dioxide nuclear fuel pellets. Beryllium compounds were used in fluorescent lighting tubes, but this use was discontinued because of the disease berylliosis which developed in the workers who were making the tubes.

=== Medical applications ===
Beryllium is a component of several dental alloys. In addition to standard X-ray equipment mentioned in Beryllium § Radiation windows, in medical imaging equipment, such as CT scanners and mammography machines, beryllium's strength and light weight enhance durability and performance. Beryllium is used in analytical equipment for blood, HIV, and other diseases. Beryllium alloys are used in surgical instruments, optical mirrors, and laser systems for medical treatments.

== Toxicity and safety ==
Beryllium
Hazards
- GHS labelling
Pictograms	(GHS06: Toxic) (GHS08: Health hazard) (GHS09: Environmental hazard)
Signal word	Danger
Hazard statements	H301, H315, H317, H319, H330, H335, H350i, H372
Precautionary statements	P201, P202, P280, P302, P304, P305+P351+P338, P310, P340, P352
NFPA 704 (fire diamond)	4 3 3

=== Biological effects ===
Approximately 35 micrograms of beryllium is found in the average human body, an amount not considered harmful. Beryllium is chemically similar to magnesium and therefore can displace it from enzymes, which causes them to malfunction. Because Be^{2+} is a highly charged and small ion, it can easily get into many tissues and cells, where it specifically targets cell nuclei, inhibiting many enzymes, including those used for synthesizing DNA. Its toxicity is exacerbated by the fact that the body has no means to control beryllium levels, and once inside the body, beryllium cannot be removed.

=== Inhalation ===
Chronic beryllium disease (CBD), or berylliosis, is a pulmonary and systemic granulomatous disease caused by inhalation of dust or fumes contaminated with beryllium; either large amounts over a short time or small amounts over a long time can lead to this ailment. Symptoms of the disease can take up to five years to develop; about a third of patients with it die and the survivors are left disabled. The International Agency for Research on Cancer (IARC) lists beryllium and beryllium compounds as Category 1 carcinogens.

=== Occupational exposure ===
In the US, the Occupational Safety and Health Administration (OSHA) has designated a permissible exposure limit (PEL) for beryllium and beryllium compounds of 0.2 μg/m^{3} as an 8-hour time-weighted average (TWA) and 2.0 μg/m^{3} as a short-term exposure limit over a sampling period of 15 minutes. The National Institute for Occupational Safety and Health (NIOSH) has set a recommended exposure limit (REL) upper-bound threshold of 0.5 μg/m^{3}. The IDLH (immediately dangerous to life and health) value is 4 mg/m^{3}. The toxicity of beryllium is on par with other toxic metalloids/metals, such as arsenic and mercury.

Exposure to beryllium in the workplace can lead to a sensitized immune response, and over time development of berylliosis. NIOSH in the United States researches these effects in collaboration with a major manufacturer of beryllium products. NIOSH also conducts genetic research on sensitization and CBD, independently of this collaboration.

Acute beryllium disease in the form of chemical pneumonitis was first reported in Europe in 1933 and in the United States in 1943. A survey found that about 5% of workers in plants manufacturing fluorescent lamps in 1949 in the United States had beryllium-related lung diseases. Chronic berylliosis resembles sarcoidosis in many respects, and the differential diagnosis is often difficult. It killed some early workers in nuclear weapons design, such as Herbert L. Anderson.

Beryllium may be found in coal slag. When the slag is formulated into an abrasive agent for blasting paint and rust from hard surfaces, the beryllium can become airborne and become a source of exposure.

Although the use of beryllium compounds in fluorescent lighting tubes was discontinued in 1949, potential for exposure to beryllium exists in the nuclear and aerospace industries, in the refining of beryllium metal and the melting of beryllium-containing alloys, in the manufacturing of electronic devices, and in the handling of other beryllium-containing material.

=== Detection ===
Early researchers undertook the highly hazardous practice of identifying beryllium and its various compounds from its sweet taste. A modern test for beryllium in air and on surfaces has been developed and published as an international voluntary consensus standard, ASTM D7202. The procedure uses dilute ammonium bifluoride for dissolution and fluorescence detection with beryllium bound to sulfonated hydroxybenzoquinoline, allowing up to 100 times more sensitive detection than the recommended limit for beryllium concentration in the workplace. Fluorescence increases with increasing beryllium concentration. The new procedure has been successfully tested on a variety of surfaces and is effective for the dissolution and detection of refractory beryllium oxide and siliceous beryllium in minute concentrations (ASTM D7458). The NIOSH Manual of Analytical Methods contains methods for measuring occupational exposures to beryllium.

== Cited sources ==
- Emsley, John (2001). Nature's Building Blocks: An A–Z Guide to the Elements. Oxford, England, UK: Oxford University Press. ISBN 978-0-19-850340-8.
- Weeks, Mary Elvira; Leichester, Henry M. (1968). Discovery of the Elements. Easton, PA: Journal of Chemical Education. LCCCN 68-15217.
