= Beryllium oxide =

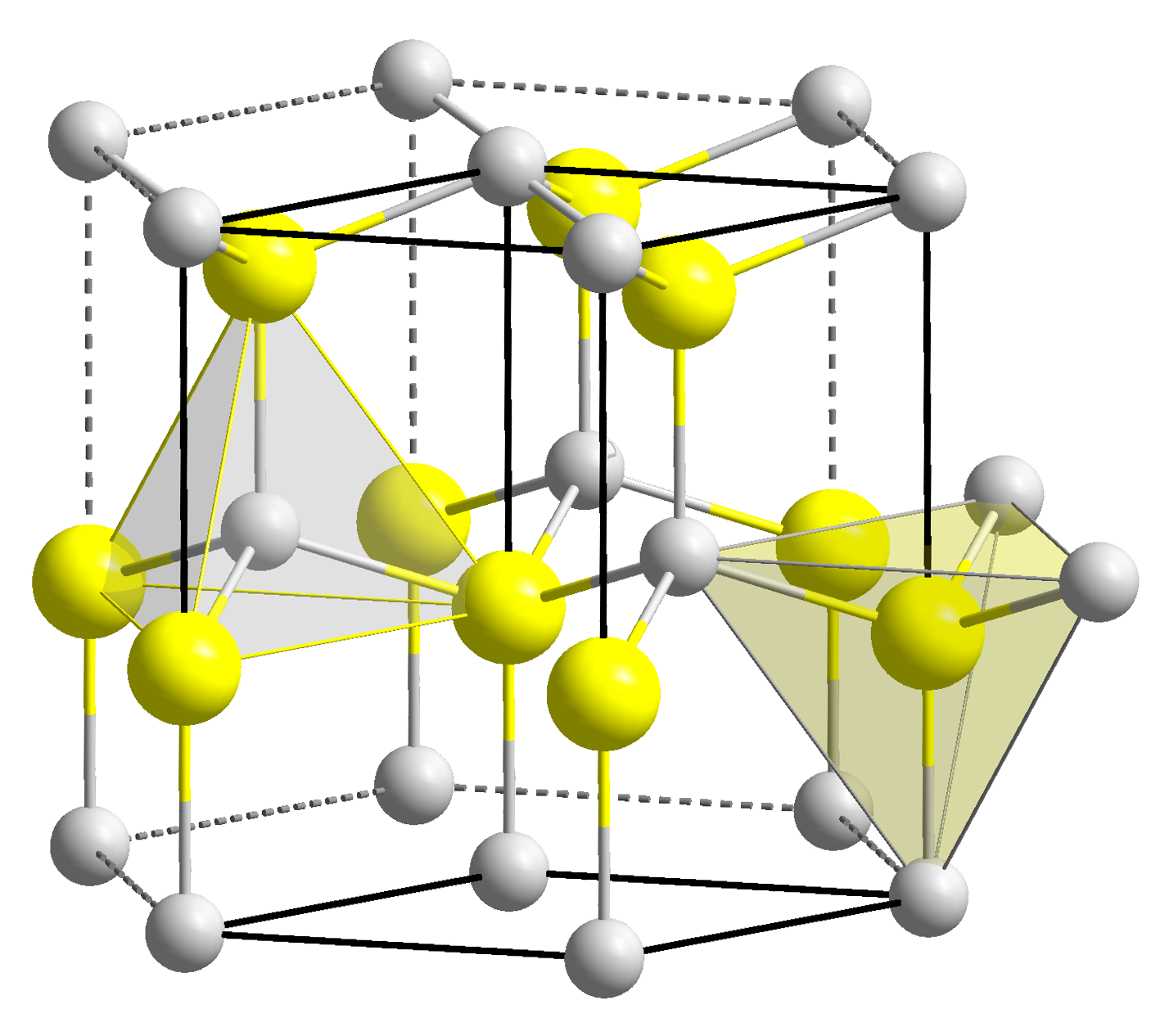
- Unit cell, ball and stick model of beryllium oxide

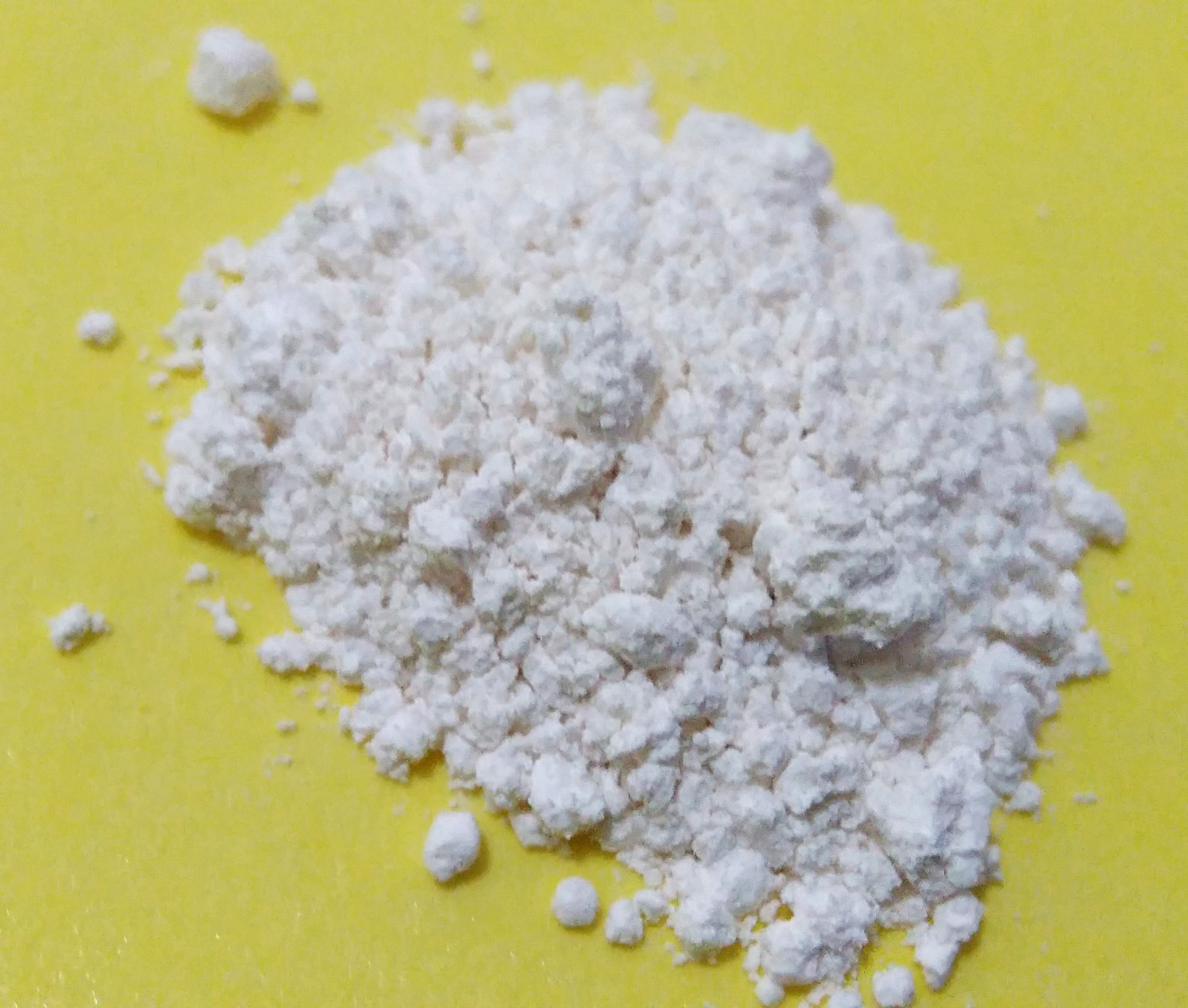

Names
- Preferred IUPAC name Beryllium(II) monoxide
- Systematic IUPAC name Oxoberyllium
- Other names Beryllia, Thermalox, Bromellite, Thermalox 995.

Identifiers
CAS Number	1304-56-9
3D model (JSmol)	Interactive image; Interactive image
Beilstein Reference	3902801
ChEBI	CHEBI:62842
ChemSpider	14092
ECHA InfoCard	100.013.758
EC Number	215-133-1
MeSH	beryllium+oxide
PubChem CID	14775
RTECS number	DS4025000
UNII	2S8NLR37S3
UN number	1566
CompTox Dashboard (EPA)	DTXSID30872818
- InChI: InChI=1S/Be.O Key: LTPBRCUWZOMYOC-UHFFFAOYSA-N; InChI=1/Be.O/rBeO/c1-2 Key: LTPBRCUWZOMYOC-SRAGPBHZAE
- SMILES: [Be]=[O]; [Be-]#[O+]

Properties
Chemical formula	BeO
Molar mass	25.011 g·mol^{−1}
Appearance	Colourless, vitreous crystals
Odor	Odourless
Density	3.01 g/cm^{3}
Melting point	2,578 °C (4,672 °F; 2,851 K)
Band gap	10.6 eV
Magnetic susceptibility (χ)	−11.9·10^{−6} cm^{3}/mol
Thermal conductivity	210 W/(m·K)
Refractive index (n_{D})	n_{1}1.7184, n_{2}=1.733

Structure
Crystal structure	Hexagonal, zincite
Space group	P6_{3}mc
Point group	C_{6v}
Lattice constant	a = 2.6979 Å, c = 4.3772 Å
Formula units (Z)	2
Molecular shape	Linear

Thermochemistry
Heat capacity (C)	25.6 J/(K·mol)
Std molar entropy (S^{⦵}_{298})	13.77±0.04 J/(K·mol)
Std enthalpy of formation (Δ_{f}H^{⦵}_{298})	−609.4±2.5 kJ/mol
Gibbs free energy (Δ_{f}G^{⦵})	−580.1 kJ/mol
Enthalpy of fusion (Δ_{f}H^{⦵}_{fus})	86 kJ/mol

Hazards
- Occupational safety and health (OHS/OSH)
Main hazards	Very toxic, Group 1B carcinogen
- GHS labelling
Pictograms	(GHS06: Toxic) (GHS08: Health hazard) (GHS09: Environmental hazard)
Signal word	Danger
Hazard statements	H301, H315, H317, H319, H330, H335, H350, H372
Precautionary statements	P201, P260, P280, P284, P301+P310, P305+P351+P338
NFPA 704 (fire diamond)	4 0 0
- Lethal dose or concentration (LD, LC)
LD_{50} (median dose)	15 mg/kg (mouse, oral)
- NIOSH (US health exposure limits)
PEL (Permissible)	TWA 0.002 mg/m^{3} C 0.005 mg/m^{3} (30 minutes), with a maximum peak of 0.025 mg/m^{3} (as Be)
REL (Recommended)	Ca C 0.0005 mg/m^{3} (as Be)
IDLH (Immediate danger)	Ca [4 mg/m^{3} (as Be)]

Related compounds
Other anions	Beryllium telluride
Other cations	Magnesium oxide; Calcium oxide; Strontium oxide; Barium oxide

Supplementary data page
- Beryllium oxide (data page)
- Except where otherwise noted, data are given for materials in their standard state (at 25 °C [77 °F], 100 kPa). verify (what is ?) Infobox references

Beryllium oxide (BeO), also known as beryllia, is an inorganic compound with the formula BeO. This colourless solid is an electrical insulator with a higher thermal conductivity than any other non-metal except diamond, and exceeds that of most metals. As an amorphous solid, beryllium oxide is white. Its high melting point leads to its use as a refractory material. It occurs in nature as the mineral bromellite. Historically and in materials science, beryllium oxide was called glucina or glucinium oxide, owing to its sweet taste.

== Preparation and chemical properties ==
Beryllium oxide can be prepared by calcining (roasting) beryllium carbonate, dehydrating beryllium hydroxide, or igniting metallic beryllium:

BeCO_{3} → BeO + CO_{2}
Be(OH)_{2} → BeO + H_{2}O
2 Be + O_{2} → 2 BeO

Igniting beryllium in air gives a mixture of BeO and the nitride Be_{3}N_{2}. Unlike the oxides formed by the other Group 2 elements (alkaline earth metals), beryllium oxide is amphoteric rather than basic.

Beryllium oxide formed at high temperatures (>800 °C) is inert, but dissolves easily in hot aqueous ammonium bifluoride (NH_{4}HF_{2}) or a solution of hot concentrated sulfuric acid (H_{2}SO_{4}) and ammonium sulfate ((NH_{4})_{2}SO_{4}).

== Structure ==
BeO crystallizes in the hexagonal wurtzite structure, featuring tetrahedral Be^{2+} and O^{2−} centres, like lonsdaleite and w-BN (with both of which it is isoelectronic). In contrast, the oxides of the larger group-2 metals, i.e., MgO, CaO, SrO, BaO, crystallize in the cubic rock salt motif with octahedral geometry about the dications and dianions. At high temperature the structure transforms to a tetragonal form.

In the vapour phase, beryllium oxide is present as discrete diatomic molecules. In the language of valence bond theory, these molecules can be described as adopting sp orbital hybridisation on both atoms, featuring one σ bond (between one sp orbital on each atom) and one π bond (between aligned p orbitals on each atom oriented perpendicular to the molecular axis). Molecular orbital theory provides a slightly different picture with no net σ bonding (because the 2s orbitals of the two atoms combine to form a filled sigma bonding orbital and a filled sigma* anti-bonding orbital) and two π bonds formed between both pairs of p orbitals oriented perpendicular to the molecular axis. The sigma orbital formed by the p orbitals aligned along the molecular axis is unfilled. The corresponding ground state is ...(2sσ)^{2}(2sσ*)^{2}(2pπ)^{4} (as in the isoelectronic C_{2} molecule), where both bonds can be considered as dative bonds from oxygen towards beryllium.

== Applications ==
High-quality crystals may be grown hydrothermally, or otherwise by the Verneuil method. For the most part, beryllium oxide is produced as a white amorphous powder, sintered into larger shapes. Impurities, like carbon, can give rise to a variety of colours to the otherwise colourless host crystals.

Sintered beryllium oxide is a very stable ceramic. Beryllium oxide is used in rocket engines and as a transparent protective over-coating on aluminised telescope mirrors. Metal-coated beryllium oxide (BeO) plates are used in the control systems of aircraft drive devices.

Beryllium oxide is used in many high-performance semiconductor parts for applications such as radio equipment because it has good thermal conductivity while also being a good electrical insulator. It is used as a filler in some thermal interface materials such as thermal grease. It is also employed in heat sinks and spreaders that cool electronic devices, such as CPUs, lasers, and power amplifiers. Some power semiconductor devices have used beryllium oxide ceramic between the silicon chip and the metal mounting base of the package to achieve a lower value of thermal resistance than a similar construction of aluminium oxide. It is also used as a structural ceramic for high-performance microwave devices, vacuum tubes, cavity magnetrons, and gas lasers. BeO has been proposed as a neutron moderator for naval marine high-temperature gas-cooled reactors (MGCR), as well as NASA's Kilopower nuclear reactor for space applications.

== Safety ==
BeO is carcinogenic in powdered form and may cause a chronic allergic-type lung disease berylliosis. Once fired into solid form, it is safe to handle if not subjected to machining that generates dust. Clean breakage releases little dust, but crushing or grinding actions can pose a risk.

== Cited sources ==
- Haynes, William M., ed. (2016). CRC Handbook of Chemistry and Physics (97th ed.). CRC Press. ISBN 9781498754293.
