= Beryllium telluride =

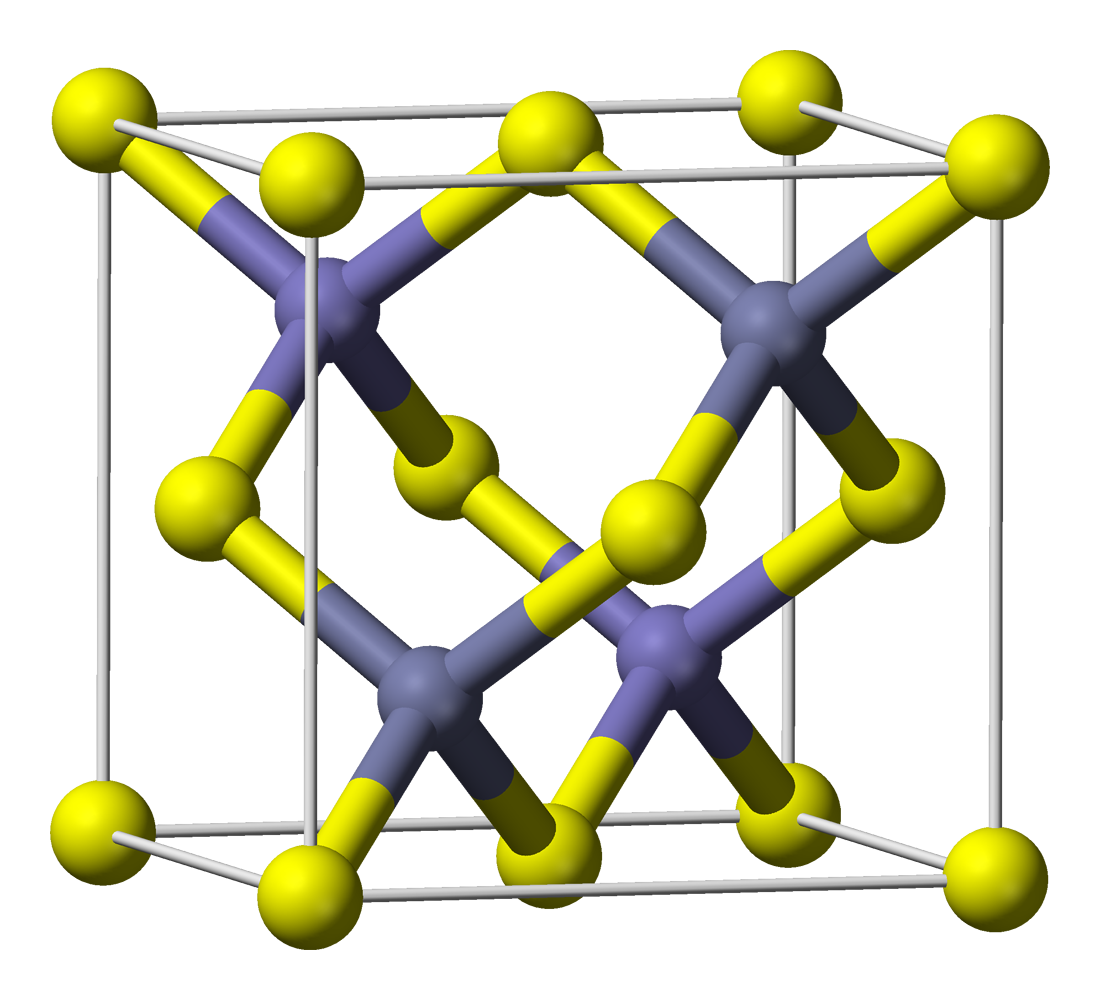

Identifiers
CAS Number	12232-27-8
3D model (JSmol)	Interactive image
ChemSpider	34998374
ECHA InfoCard	100.032.217
EC Number	235-451-4
PubChem CID	82991
CompTox Dashboard (EPA)	DTXSID4065282
- InChI: InChI=1S/Be.Te Key: PUZSUGPVBHGJRE-UHFFFAOYSA-N
- SMILES: [Be]=[Te]

Properties
Chemical formula	BeTe
Molar mass	136.612 g/mol
Density	5.1 g/cm^{3}

Structure
Crystal structure	sphalerite
Space group	F4̅3m, No. 216, cF8

Hazards
- NIOSH (US health exposure limits)
PEL (Permissible)	TWA 0.002 mg/m^{3} C 0.005 mg/m^{3} (30 minutes), with a maximum peak of 0.025 mg/m^{3} (as Be)
REL (Recommended)	Ca C 0.0005 mg/m^{3} (as Be)
IDLH (Immediate danger)	Ca [4 mg/m^{3} (as Be)]
- Except where otherwise noted, data are given for materials in their standard state (at 25 °C [77 °F], 100 kPa). verify (what is ?) Infobox references

Beryllium telluride (BeTe) is a chemical compound of beryllium and tellurium. It is a crystalline solid with the lattice constant of 0.5615 nm. It is a semiconductor with a large energy gap of around 3 eV. Toxicity is unknown. Toxic hydrogen telluride gas is evolved on exposure to water.
