= Beryllium chloride =

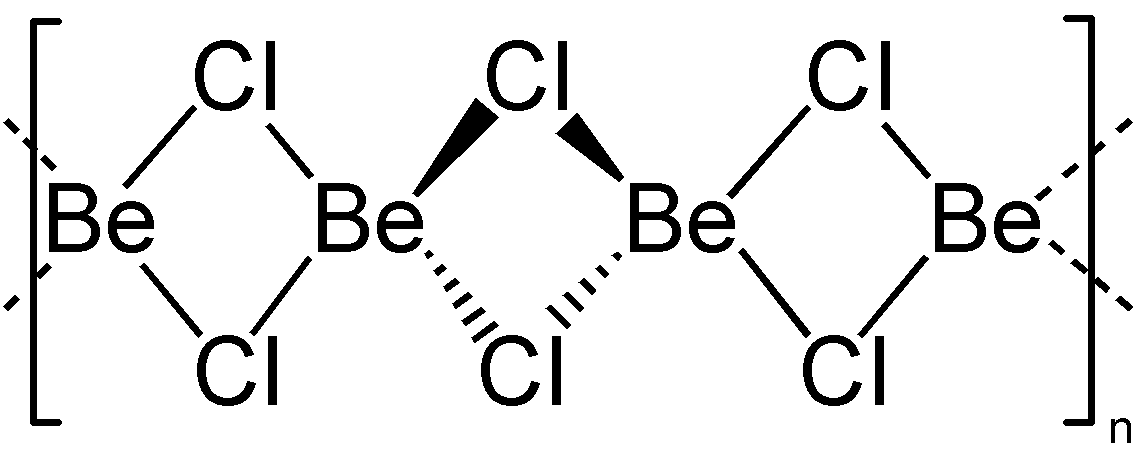

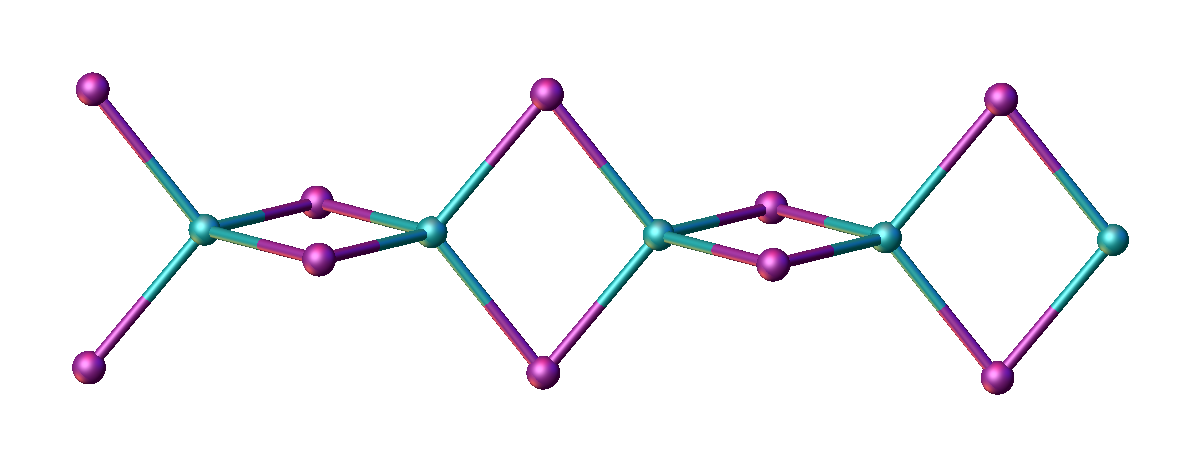

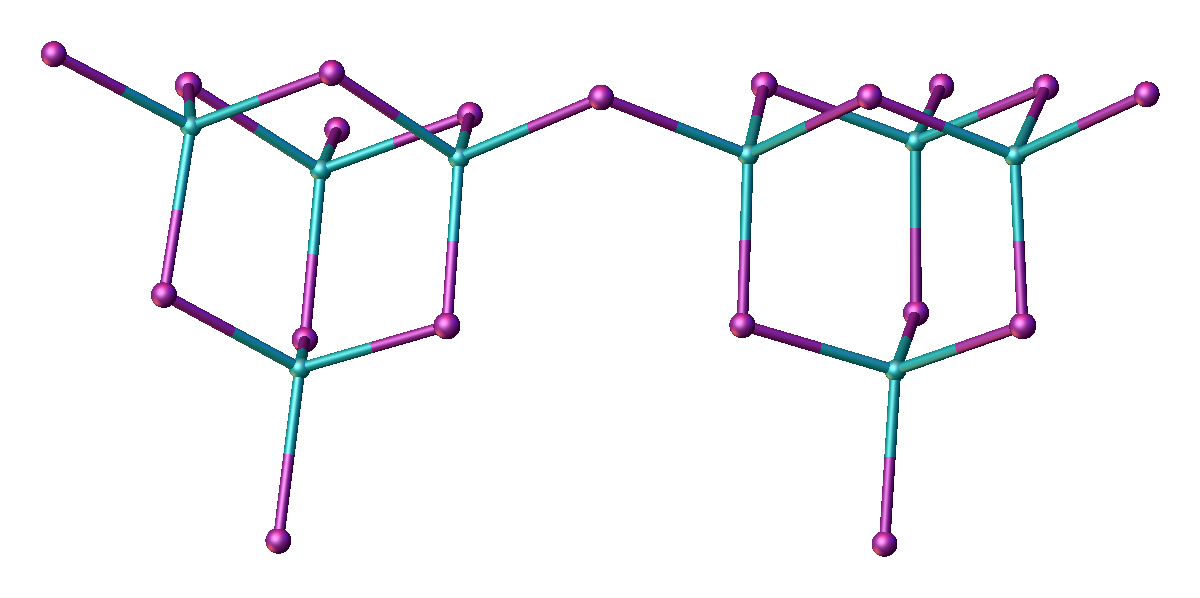

Names
- IUPAC name Beryllium chloride

Identifiers
CAS Number	7787-47-5
3D model (JSmol)	ionic depiction: Interactive image; covalent monomer: Interactive image; polymer: Interactive image
ChemSpider	22991
ECHA InfoCard	100.029.197
PubChem CID	24588
RTECS number	DS2625000
UNII	58B7024067
CompTox Dashboard (EPA)	DTXSID10858756
- InChI: InChI=1S/Be.2ClH/h;2*1H/q+2;;/p-2 Key: LWBPNIJBHRISSS-UHFFFAOYSA-L; InChI=1/Be.2ClH/h;2*1H/q+2;;/p-2 Key: LWBPNIJBHRISSS-NUQVWONBAX
- SMILES: ionic depiction: [Be+2].[Cl-].[Cl-]; covalent monomer: Cl[Be]Cl; polymer: Cl[Be-2](Cl)([Cl+]1)[Cl+][Be-2]1([Cl+]1)[Cl+][Be-2]1([Cl+]1)[Cl+][Be-2]1([Cl+]1)[Cl+][Be-2]1([Cl+]1)[Cl+][Be-2]1([Cl+]1)[Cl+][Be-2]1([Cl+]1)[Cl+][Be-2]1([Cl+]1)[Cl+][Be-2]1([Cl+]1)[Cl+][Be-2]1([Cl+]1)[Cl+][Be-2]1([Cl+]1)[Cl+][Be-2]1([Cl+]1)[Cl+][Be-2]1(Cl)Cl

Properties
Chemical formula	BeCl_{2}
Molar mass	79.9182 g/mol
Appearance	White or yellow crystals
Density	1.899 g/cm^{3}, solid
Melting point	399 °C (750 °F; 672 K)
Boiling point	482 °C (900 °F; 755 K)
Solubility in water	15.1 g/100 mL (20 °C)
Solubility	soluble in alcohol, ether, benzene, and pyridine slightly soluble in chloroform and sulfur dioxide

Structure
Crystal structure	hexagonal
Molecular shape	polymer

Thermochemistry
Heat capacity (C)	7.808 J/K or 71.1 J/mol K
Std molar entropy (S^{⦵}_{298})	63 J/mol K
Std enthalpy of formation (Δ_{f}H^{⦵}_{298})	−6.136 kJ/g or −494 kJ/mol
Gibbs free energy (Δ_{f}G^{⦵})	−468 kJ/mol
Std enthalpy of combustion (Δ_{c}H^{⦵}_{298})	16 kJ/mol

Hazards
- Lethal dose or concentration (LD, LC)
LD_{50} (median dose)	86 mg/kg (rat, oral)
- NIOSH (US health exposure limits)
PEL (Permissible)	TWA 0.002 mg/m^{3} C 0.005 mg/m^{3} (30 minutes), with a maximum peak of 0.025 mg/m^{3} (as Be)
REL (Recommended)	Ca C 0.0005 mg/m^{3} (as Be)
IDLH (Immediate danger)	Ca [4 mg/m^{3} (as Be)]

Related compounds
Other anions	Beryllium fluoride Beryllium bromide Beryllium iodide
Other cations	Magnesium chloride Calcium chloride Strontium chloride Barium chloride Radium chloride
- Except where otherwise noted, data are given for materials in their standard state (at 25 °C [77 °F], 100 kPa). verify (what is ?) Infobox references

Beryllium chloride is an inorganic compound with the formula BeCl_{2}. It is a colourless, hygroscopic solid that dissolves well in many polar solvents. Its properties are similar to those of aluminium chloride, due to beryllium's diagonal relationship with aluminium.

== Structure and synthesis ==
Beryllium chloride is prepared by reaction of the metal with chlorine at high temperatures:

Be + Cl_{2} → BeCl_{2}

BeCl_{2} can also be prepared by carbothermal reduction of beryllium oxide in the presence of chlorine. BeCl_{2} can be prepared by treating beryllium with hydrogen chloride.

Two forms (polymorphs) of BeCl_{2} are known. Both structures consist tetrahedral Be^{2+} centers interconnected by doubly bridging chloride ligands. One form consist of edge-sharing polytetrahedra. The other form resembles zinc iodide with interconnected adamantane-like cages. In contrast, BeF_{2} is a 3-dimensional polymer, with a structure akin to that of quartz.

In the gas phase, BeCl_{2} exists both as a linear monomer and a bridged dimer with two bridging chlorine atoms where the beryllium atom is 3-coordinate. The linear shape of the monomeric form is as predicted by VSEPR theory. The linear shape contrasts with the monomeric forms of some of the dihalides of the heavier members of group 2, e.g. CaF_{2}, SrF_{2}, BaF_{2}, SrCl_{2}, BaCl_{2}, BaBr_{2}, and BaI_{2}, which are all non-linear. Beryllium chloride dissolves to give tetrahedral [Be(OH_{2})_{4}]^{2+} ion in aqueous solutions as confirmed by vibrational spectroscopy.

== Reactions ==
When treated with water, beryllium chloride forms a tetrahydrate, BeCl_{2}•4H_{2}O ([Be(H_{2}O)_{4}]Cl_{2}). BeCl_{2} is also soluble in some ethers.

When suspended in diethyl ether, beryllium chloride converts to the colorless dietherate:

BeCl_{2} + 2 O(C_{2}H_{5})_{2} → BeCl_{2}(O(C_{2}H_{5})_{2})_{2}

This ether ligand can be displaced by other Lewis bases.

Beryllium chloride forms complexes with phosphines.

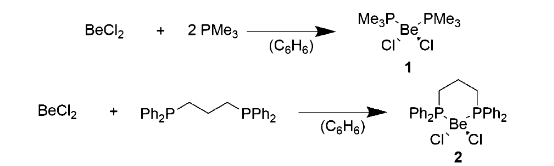
Phosphine type coordination with a Be Halide Complex

== Applications ==
Beryllium chloride is used as a raw material for the electrolysis of beryllium, and as a catalyst for Friedel-Crafts reactions.
