= Radium compounds =

Compounds containing at least one radium atom

Radium compounds are compounds containing the element radium (Ra). Due to radium's radioactivity, not many compounds have been well characterized. Solid radium compounds are white as radium ions provide no specific coloring, but they gradually turn yellow and then dark over time due to self-radiolysis from radium's alpha decay. Insoluble radium compounds coprecipitate with all barium, most strontium, and most lead compounds.

== Oxides and hydroxides ==
Radium oxide (RaO) has not been characterized well past its existence, despite oxides being common compounds for the other alkaline earth metals. Radium hydroxide (Ra(OH)_{2}) is the most readily soluble among the alkaline earth hydroxides and is a stronger base than its barium congener, barium hydroxide. It is also more soluble than actinium hydroxide and thorium hydroxide: these three adjacent hydroxides may be separated by precipitating them with ammonia.

== Halides ==
Radium fluoride (RaF_{2}) is a highly radioactive compound. It can be coprecipitated with lanthanide fluorides. Radium fluoride has the same crystal form as calcium fluoride (fluorite). It can be prepared by the reaction of radium metal and hydrogen fluoride gas:

Ra + 2 HF → RaF_{2} + H_{2}

Radium chloride (RaCl_{2}) is a colorless, luminous compound. It becomes yellow after some time due to self-damage by the alpha radiation given off by radium when it decays. Small amounts of barium impurities give the compound a rose color. It is soluble in water, though less so than barium chloride, and its solubility decreases with increasing concentration of hydrochloric acid. Crystallization from aqueous solution gives the dihydrate RaCl_{2}·2H_{2}O, isomorphous with its barium analog.

Radium bromide (RaBr_{2}) is also a colorless, luminous compound. In water, it is more soluble than radium chloride. Like radium chloride, crystallization from aqueous solution gives the dihydrate RaBr_{2}·2H_{2}O, isomorphous with its barium analog. The ionizing radiation emitted by radium bromide excites nitrogen molecules in the air, making it glow. The alpha particles emitted by radium quickly gain two electrons to become neutral helium, which builds up inside and weakens radium bromide crystals. This effect sometimes causes the crystals to break or even explode.

== Other compounds ==
Radium nitrate (Ra(NO_{3})_{2}) is a white compound that can be made by dissolving radium carbonate in nitric acid. As the concentration of nitric acid increases, the solubility of radium nitrate decreases, an important property for the chemical purification of radium.

Radium forms much the same insoluble salts as its lighter congener barium: it forms the insoluble sulfate (RaSO_{4}, the most insoluble known sulfate), chromate (RaCrO_{4}), carbonate (RaCO_{3}), iodate (Ra(IO_{3})_{2}), tetrafluoroberyllate (RaBeF_{4}), and nitrate (Ra(NO_{3})_{2}). With the exception of the carbonate, all of these are less soluble in water than the corresponding barium salts, but they are all isostructural to their barium counterparts. Additionally, radium phosphate, radium oxalate, and radium sulfite are probably also insoluble, as they coprecipitate with the corresponding insoluble barium salts. The great insolubility of radium sulfate (at 20 °C, only 2.1 mg will dissolve in 1 kg of water) means that it is one of the less biologically dangerous radium compounds. The large ionic radius of Ra^{2+} (148 pm) results in weak complexation and poor extraction of radium from aqueous solutions when not at high pH.

== See also ==
- Category:Radium compounds
- Francium compounds
- Actinium compounds
- Barium compounds
