= Paneth =

Paneth may refer to:

- Fajans–Paneth–Hahn Law, chemistry rule concerning co-precipitation and adsorption
- Friedrich Paneth (1887–1958), Austrian-born British chemist
- Joseph Paneth (1857–1890), Austrian physiologist from Vienna
- Nigel Paneth (born 1946), English epidemiologist
- Paneth (crater), lunar impact crater that is located on the far side of the Moon
- Paneth cell, found in the intestinal tract
