= Radium =

Radium, _{88}Ra
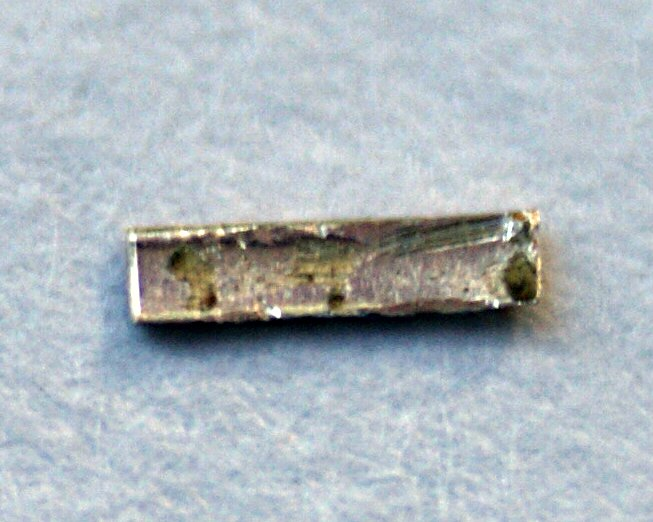
- Radium electroplated on a very small sample of copper foil and covered with polyurethane to prevent reaction with the air

Radium
- Pronunciation: /ˈreɪdiəm/ (RAY-dee-əm)
- Appearance: silvery white metallic
- Mass number: [226]

Radium in the periodic table
Hydrogen																															Helium
Lithium	Beryllium																									Boron	Carbon	Nitrogen	Oxygen	Fluorine	Neon
Sodium	Magnesium																									Aluminium	Silicon	Phosphorus	Sulfur	Chlorine	Argon
Potassium	Calcium															Scandium	Titanium	Vanadium	Chromium	Manganese	Iron	Cobalt	Nickel	Copper	Zinc	Gallium	Germanium	Arsenic	Selenium	Bromine	Krypton
Rubidium	Strontium															Yttrium	Zirconium	Niobium	Molybdenum	Technetium	Ruthenium	Rhodium	Palladium	Silver	Cadmium	Indium	Tin	Antimony	Tellurium	Iodine	Xenon
Caesium	Barium	Lanthanum	Cerium	Praseodymium	Neodymium	Promethium	Samarium	Europium	Gadolinium	Terbium	Dysprosium	Holmium	Erbium	Thulium	Ytterbium	Lutetium	Hafnium	Tantalum	Tungsten	Rhenium	Osmium	Iridium	Platinum	Gold	Mercury (element)	Thallium	Lead	Bismuth	Polonium	Astatine	Radon
Francium	Radium	Actinium	Thorium	Protactinium	Uranium	Neptunium	Plutonium	Americium	Curium	Berkelium	Californium	Einsteinium	Fermium	Mendelevium	Nobelium	Lawrencium	Rutherfordium	Dubnium	Seaborgium	Bohrium	Hassium	Meitnerium	Darmstadtium	Roentgenium	Copernicium	Nihonium	Flerovium	Moscovium	Livermorium	Tennessine	Oganesson
Ba
↑
Ra
↓
(Ubn)
francium ← radium → actinium
- Atomic number (Z): 88
- Group: group 2 (alkaline earth metals)
- Period: period 7
- Block: s-block
- Electron configuration: [Rn] 7s^{2}
- Electrons per shell: 2, 8, 18, 32, 18, 8, 2

Physical properties
- Phase at STP: solid
- Melting point: 973 K (700 °C, 1292 °F) (disputed)
- Boiling point: 2010 K (1737 °C, 3159 °F)
- Density (near r.t.): 5.5 g/cm^{3}
- Heat of fusion: 8.5 kJ/mol
- Heat of vaporization: 113 kJ/mol
Vapor pressure
P (Pa)	1	10	100	1 k	10 k	100 k
at T (K)	819	906	1037	1209	1446	1799

Atomic properties
- Oxidation states: common: +2
- Electronegativity: Pauling scale: 0.9
- Ionization energies: 1st: 509.3 kJ/mol; 2nd: 979.0 kJ/mol
- Covalent radius: 221±2 pm
- Van der Waals radius: 283 pm
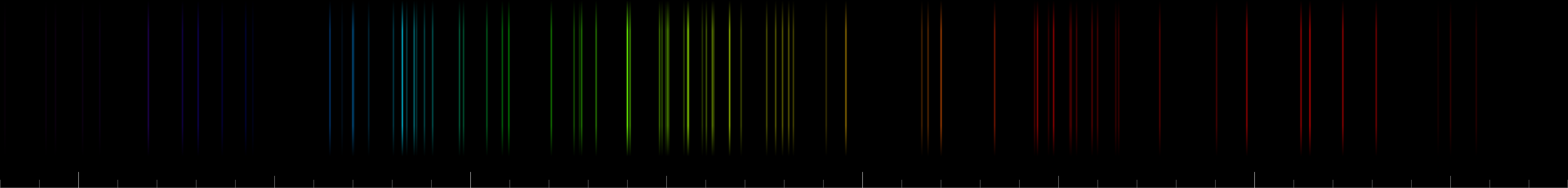
- Spectral lines of radium

Other properties
- Natural occurrence: from decay
- Crystal structure: body-centered cubic (bcc) (cF4)
- Lattice constant: a = 514.8 pm (near r.t.)
- Thermal conductivity: 18.6 W/(m⋅K)
- Electrical resistivity: 1 µΩ⋅m (at 20 °C)
- Magnetic ordering: nonmagnetic
- CAS Number: 7440-14-4

History
- Naming: after Latin radius (ray), for emitting in the form of rays as it decays
- Discovery: Pierre and Marie Curie (1898)
- First isolation: Marie Curie (1910)

Isotopes of radium
Main isotopes			Decay	
Isotope	abundance	half-life (t_{1/2})	mode	product
^{223}Ra	(unstable)	11.435 d	α	^{219}Rn
^{224}Ra	(unstable)	3.632 d	α	^{220}Rn
^{225}Ra	(unstable)	14.8 d	β^{−}	^{225}Ac
^{225}Ra	(unstable)	14.8 d	α	^{221}Rn
^{226}Ra	(unstable)	1600 y	α	^{222}Rn
^{228}Ra	(unstable)	5.75 y	β^{−}	^{228}Ac

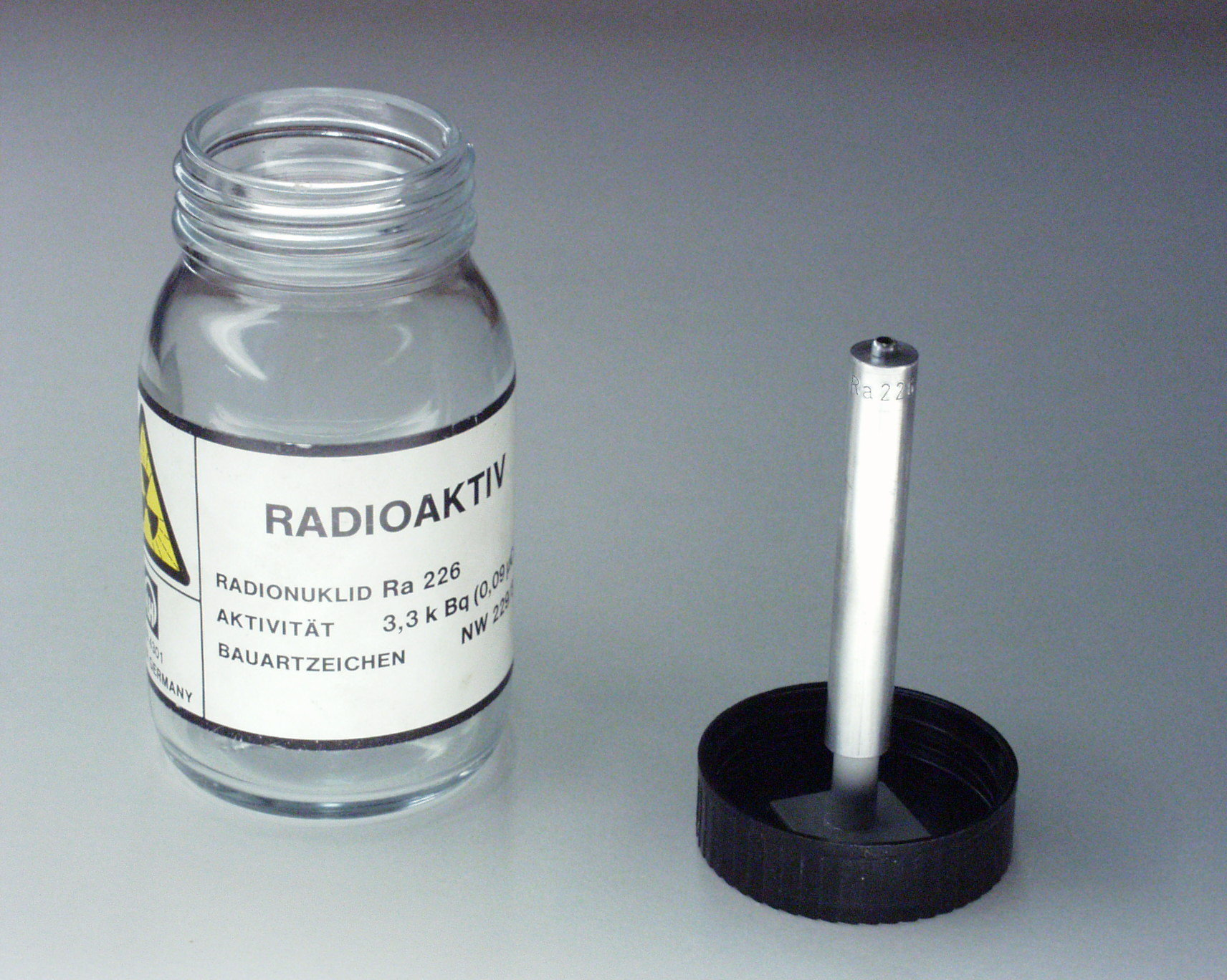
Radium-226 radiation source.; Activity 3300 Bq (3.3 kBq)

Radium is a chemical element; it has symbol Ra and atomic number 88. It is the sixth element in group 2 of the periodic table, also known as the alkaline earth metals. Pure radium is silvery-white, but it readily reacts with nitrogen (rather than oxygen) upon exposure to air, forming a black surface layer of radium nitride (Ra_{3}N_{2}). All isotopes of radium are radioactive, the most stable isotope being radium-226 with a half-life of 1,600 years. When radium decays, it emits ionizing radiation as a by-product, which can excite fluorescent chemicals and cause radioluminescence. For this property, it was widely used in self-luminous paints following its discovery. Of the radioactive elements that occur in quantity, radium is considered particularly toxic, and it is carcinogenic due to the radioactivity of both it and its immediate decay product radon as well as its tendency to accumulate in the bones.

Radium, in the form of radium chloride, was discovered by Marie and Pierre Curie in 1898 from ore mined at Jáchymov. They extracted the radium compound from uraninite and published the discovery at the French Academy of Sciences five days later. Radium was isolated in its metallic state by Marie Curie and André-Louis Debierne through the electrolysis of radium chloride in 1910, and soon afterwards the metal started being produced on larger scales in Austria, the United States, and Belgium. However, the amount of radium produced globally has always been small in comparison to other elements, and by the 2010s, annual production of radium, mainly via extraction from spent nuclear fuel, was less than 100 grams.

In nature, radium is found in uranium ores in quantities as small as a seventh of a gram per ton of uraninite, and in thorium ores in trace amounts. Radium is not necessary for living organisms, and its radioactivity and chemical reactivity make adverse health effects likely when it is incorporated into biochemical processes because of its chemical mimicry of calcium, due to them both being group 2 elements. As of 2018, other than in nuclear medicine, radium has no commercial applications. Formerly, from the 1910s to the 1970s, it was used as a radioactive source for radioluminescent devices and also in radioactive quackery for its supposed curative power. In nearly all of its applications, radium has been replaced with less dangerous radioisotopes, with one of its few remaining non-medical uses being the production of actinium in nuclear reactors.

== Bulk properties ==
Radium is the heaviest known alkaline earth metal and is the only radioactive member of its group. Its physical and chemical properties most closely resemble its lighter congener, barium.

Pure radium is a volatile, lustrous silvery-white metal, even though its lighter congeners calcium, strontium, and barium have a slight yellow tint. Radium's lustrous surface rapidly becomes black upon exposure to air, likely due to the formation of radium nitride (Ra_{3}N_{2}). Its melting point is either 700 °C (1,292 °F) or 960 °C (1,760 °F) (Note: Both values are encountered in sources and there is no agreement among scientists as to the true value of the melting point of radium.) and its boiling point is 1,737 °C (3,159 °F); however, this is not well established. Both of these values are slightly lower than those of barium, confirming periodic trends down the group 2 elements. Like barium and the alkali metals, radium crystallizes in the body-centered cubic structure at standard temperature and pressure: the radium–radium bond distance is 514.8 picometers. Radium has a density of 5.5 g/cm^{3}, higher than that of barium, and the two elements have similar crystal structures (bcc at standard temperature and pressure).

== Isotopes ==
Decay chain of ^{238}U, the primordial progenitor of ^{226}Ra

Radium has 33 known isotopes with mass numbers from 202 to 234, all of which are radioactive. Four of these – ^{223}Ra (half-life 11.4 days), ^{224}Ra (3.64 days), ^{226}Ra (1600 years), and ^{228}Ra (5.75 years) – occur naturally in the decay chains of primordial thorium-232, uranium-235, and uranium-238 (^{223}Ra from uranium-235, ^{226}Ra from uranium-238, and the other two from thorium-232). These isotopes nevertheless still have half-lives too short to be primordial radionuclides, and only exist in nature from these decay chains. Together with the mostly artificial ^{225}Ra (15 d), which occurs in nature only as a decay product of minute traces of neptunium-237, these are the five most stable isotopes of radium. All other 27 known radium isotopes have half-lives under two hours, and the majority have half-lives under a minute. Of these, ^{221}Ra (half-life 28 s) also occurs as a ^{237}Np daughter, and ^{220}Ra and ^{222}Ra would be produced by the still-unobserved double beta decay of natural radon isotopes. At least 12 nuclear isomers have been reported, the most stable of which is radium-205m with a half-life between 130~230 milliseconds; this is still shorter than twenty-four ground-state radium isotopes.

^{226}Ra is the most stable isotope of radium and is the last isotope in the (4n + 2) decay chain of uranium-238 with a half-life of over a millennium; it makes up almost all of natural radium. Its immediate decay product is the dense radioactive noble gas radon (specifically the isotope ^{222}Rn), which is responsible for much of the danger of environmental radium. (Note: See radon mitigation.) It is 2.7 million times more radioactive than the same molar amount of natural uranium (mostly uranium-238), due to its proportionally shorter half-life.

A sample of radium metal maintains itself at a higher temperature than its surroundings because of the radiation it emits. Natural radium (which is mostly ^{226}Ra) emits mostly alpha particles, but other steps in its decay chain (the uranium or radium series) emit alpha or beta particles, and almost all particle emissions are accompanied by gamma rays.

Experimental nuclear physics studies have shown that nuclei of several radium isotopes, such as ^{222}Ra, ^{224}Ra and ^{226}Ra, have reflection-asymmetric ("pear-like") shapes. In particular, this experimental information on radium-224 has been obtained at ISOLDE using a technique called Coulomb excitation.

== Chemistry ==
Radium only exhibits the oxidation state of +2 in solution. It forms the colorless Ra^{2+} cation in aqueous solution, which is highly basic and does not form complexes readily. Most radium compounds are therefore simple ionic compounds, though participation from the 6s and 6p electrons (in addition to the valence 7s electrons) is expected due to relativistic effects and would enhance the covalent character of radium compounds such as RaF_{2} and RaAt_{2}. For this reason, the standard electrode potential for the half-reaction Ra^{2+} (aq) + 2e^{-} → Ra (s) is −2.916 V, even slightly lower than the value −2.92 V for barium, whereas the values had previously smoothly increased down the group (Ca: −2.84 V; Sr: −2.89 V; Ba: −2.92 V). The values for barium and radium are almost exactly the same as those of the heavier alkali metals potassium, rubidium, and caesium.

=== Compounds ===
Solid radium compounds are white as radium ions provide no specific coloring, but they gradually turn yellow and then dark over time due to self-radiolysis from radium's alpha decay. Insoluble radium compounds coprecipitate with all barium, most strontium, and most lead compounds.

Radium oxide (RaO) is poorly characterized, as the reaction of radium with air results in the formation of radium nitride. Radium hydroxide (Ra(OH)_{2}) is formed via the reaction of radium metal with water, and is the most readily soluble among the alkaline earth hydroxides and a stronger base than its barium congener, barium hydroxide. It is also more soluble than actinium hydroxide and thorium hydroxide: these three adjacent hydroxides may be separated by precipitating them with ammonia.

Radium chloride (RaCl_{2}) is a colorless, luminescent compound. It becomes yellow after some time due to self-damage by the alpha radiation given off by radium when it decays. Small amounts of barium impurities give the compound a rose color. It is soluble in water, though less so than barium chloride, and its solubility decreases with increasing concentration of hydrochloric acid. Crystallization from aqueous solution gives the dihydrate RaCl_{2}·2H_{2}O, isomorphous with its barium analog.

Radium bromide (RaBr_{2}) is also a colorless, luminous compound. In water, it is more soluble than radium chloride. Like radium chloride, crystallization from aqueous solution gives the dihydrate RaBr_{2}·2H_{2}O, isomorphous with its barium analog. The ionizing radiation emitted by radium bromide excites nitrogen molecules in the air, making it glow. The alpha particles emitted by radium quickly gain two electrons to become neutral helium, which builds up inside and weakens radium bromide crystals. This effect sometimes causes the crystals to break or even explode.

Radium nitrate (Ra(NO_{3})_{2}) is a white compound that can be made by dissolving radium carbonate in nitric acid. As the concentration of nitric acid increases, the solubility of radium nitrate decreases, an important property for the chemical purification of radium.

Radium forms much the same insoluble salts as its lighter congener barium: it forms the insoluble sulfate (RaSO_{4}, the most insoluble known sulfate), chromate (RaCrO_{4}), carbonate (RaCO_{3}), iodate (Ra(IO_{3})_{2}), tetrafluoroberyllate (RaBeF_{4}), and nitrate (Ra(NO_{3})_{2}). With the exception of the carbonate, all of these are less soluble in water than the corresponding barium salts, but they are all isostructural to their barium counterparts. Additionally, radium phosphate, oxalate, and sulfite are probably also insoluble, as they coprecipitate with the corresponding insoluble barium salts. The great insolubility of radium sulfate (at 20 °C, only 2.1 mg will dissolve in 1 kg of water) means that it is one of the less biologically dangerous radium compounds. The large ionic radius of Ra^{2+} (148 pm) results in weak ability to form coordination complexes and poor extraction of radium from aqueous solutions when not at high pH.

== Occurrence ==
All isotopes of radium have half-lives much shorter than the age of the Earth, so that any primordial radium would have decayed long ago. Radium nevertheless still occurs in the environment, as the isotopes ^{223}Ra, ^{224}Ra, ^{226}Ra, and ^{228}Ra are part of the decay chains of natural thorium and uranium isotopes; since thorium and uranium have very long half-lives, these daughters are continually being regenerated by their decay. Of these four isotopes, the longest-lived is ^{226}Ra (half-life 1600 years), a decay product of natural uranium. Because of its relative longevity, ^{226}Ra is the most common isotope of the element, making up about one part per trillion of the Earth's crust; essentially all natural radium is ^{226}Ra. Thus, radium is found in tiny quantities in the uranium ore uraninite and various other uranium minerals, and in even tinier quantities in thorium minerals. One ton of pitchblende typically yields about one seventh of a gram of radium. One kilogram of the Earth's crust contains about 900 picograms of radium, and one liter of sea water contains about 89 femtograms of radium.

== History ==
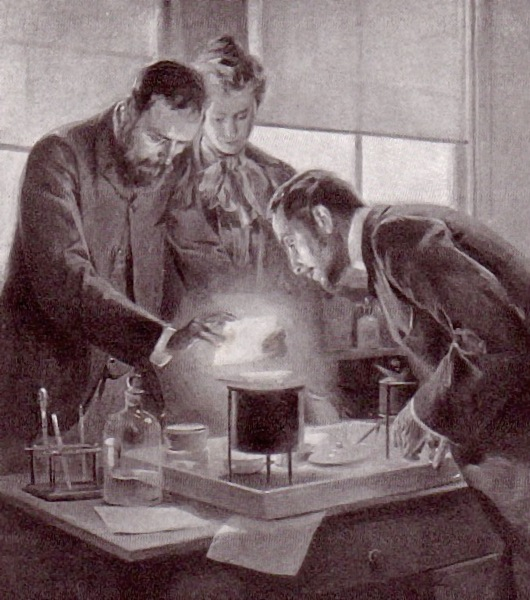
Marie and Pierre Curie experimenting with radium, a drawing by André Castaigne

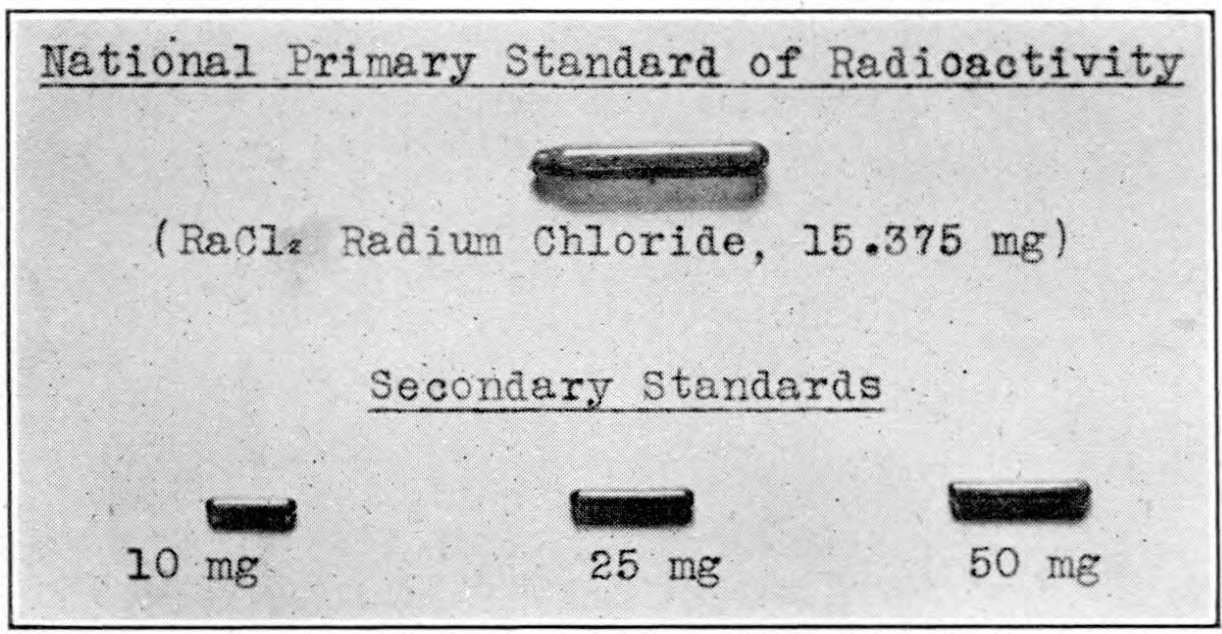
Glass tube of radium chloride kept by the US Bureau of Standards that served as the primary standard of radioactivity for the United States in 1927.

Radium was discovered by Marie Skłodowska-Curie and her husband Pierre Curie on 21 December 1898 in a uraninite (pitchblende) sample from Jáchymov. While studying the mineral earlier, the Curies removed uranium from it and found that the remaining material was still radioactive. In July 1898, while studying pitchblende, they isolated an element similar to bismuth which turned out to be polonium. They then isolated a radioactive mixture consisting of two components: compounds of barium, which gave a brilliant green flame color, and unknown radioactive compounds which gave carmine spectral lines that had never been documented before. The Curies found the radioactive compounds to be very similar to the barium compounds, except they were less soluble. This discovery made it possible for the Curies to isolate the radioactive compounds and discover a new element in them. The Curies announced their discovery to the French Academy of Sciences on 26 December 1898. The naming of radium dates to about 1899, from the French word radium, formed in Modern Latin from radius (ray): this was in recognition of radium's emission of energy in the form of rays. The gaseous emissions of radium, radon, were recognized and studied extensively by Friedrich Ernst Dorn in the early 1900s, though at the time they were characterized as "radium emanations".

In September 1910, Marie Curie and André-Louis Debierne announced that they had isolated radium as a pure metal through the electrolysis of pure radium chloride (RaCl_{2}) solution using a mercury cathode, producing radium–mercury amalgam. This amalgam was then heated in an atmosphere of hydrogen gas to remove the mercury, leaving pure radium metal. Later that same year, E. Ebler isolated radium metal by thermal decomposition of its azide, Ra(N_{3})_{2}. Radium metal was first industrially produced at the beginning of the 20th century by Biraco, a subsidiary company of Union Minière du Haut Katanga (UMHK) in its Olen plant in Belgium. The metal became an important export of Belgium from 1922 up until World War II.

The general historical unit for radioactivity, the curie, is based on the radioactivity of ^{226}Ra. It was originally defined as the radioactivity of one gram of radium-226, but the definition was later refined to be 3.7×10^{10} disintegrations per second.

=== Historical applications ===
==== Luminescent paint ====
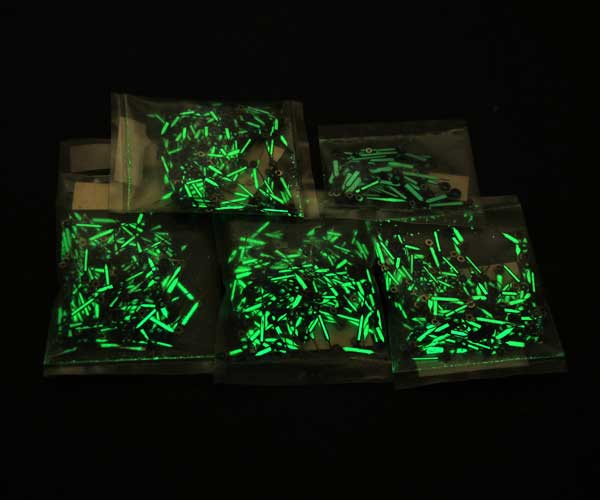
Watch hands coated with radium paint under ultraviolet light

Radium was formerly used in self-luminous paints for watches, aircraft switches, clocks, and instrument dials and panels. A typical self-luminous watch that uses radium paint contains around 1 microgram of radium. In the mid-1920s, a lawsuit was filed against the United States Radium Corporation by five dying "Radium Girls" – dial painters who had painted radium-based luminous paint on the components of watches and clocks. The dial painters were instructed to lick their brushes to give them a fine point, thereby ingesting radium. Their exposure to radium caused serious health effects which included sores, anemia, and bone cancer.

During the litigation, it was determined that the company's scientists and management had taken considerable precautions to protect themselves from the effects of radiation, but it did not seem to protect their employees. Additionally, for several years the companies had attempted to cover up the effects and avoid liability by insisting that the Radium Girls were instead suffering from syphilis.

As a result of the lawsuit, and an extensive study by the U.S. Public Health Service, the adverse effects of radioactivity became widely known, and radium-dial painters were instructed in proper safety precautions and provided with protective gear. Radium continued to be used in dials, especially in manufacturing during World War II, but from 1925 onward there were no further injuries to dial painters.

From the 1960s the use of radium paint was discontinued. In many cases luminous dials were implemented with non-radioactive fluorescent materials excited by light; such devices glow in the dark after exposure to light, but the glow fades. Where long-lasting self-luminosity in darkness was required, safer radioactive promethium-147 (half-life 2.6 years) or tritium (half-life 12 years) paint was used; both continue to be used as of 2018. These had the added advantage of not degrading the phosphor over time, unlike radium. Tritium as it is used in these applications is considered safer than radium, as it emits very low-energy beta radiation (even lower-energy than the beta radiation emitted by promethium) which cannot penetrate the skin, unlike the gamma radiation emitted by radium isotopes.

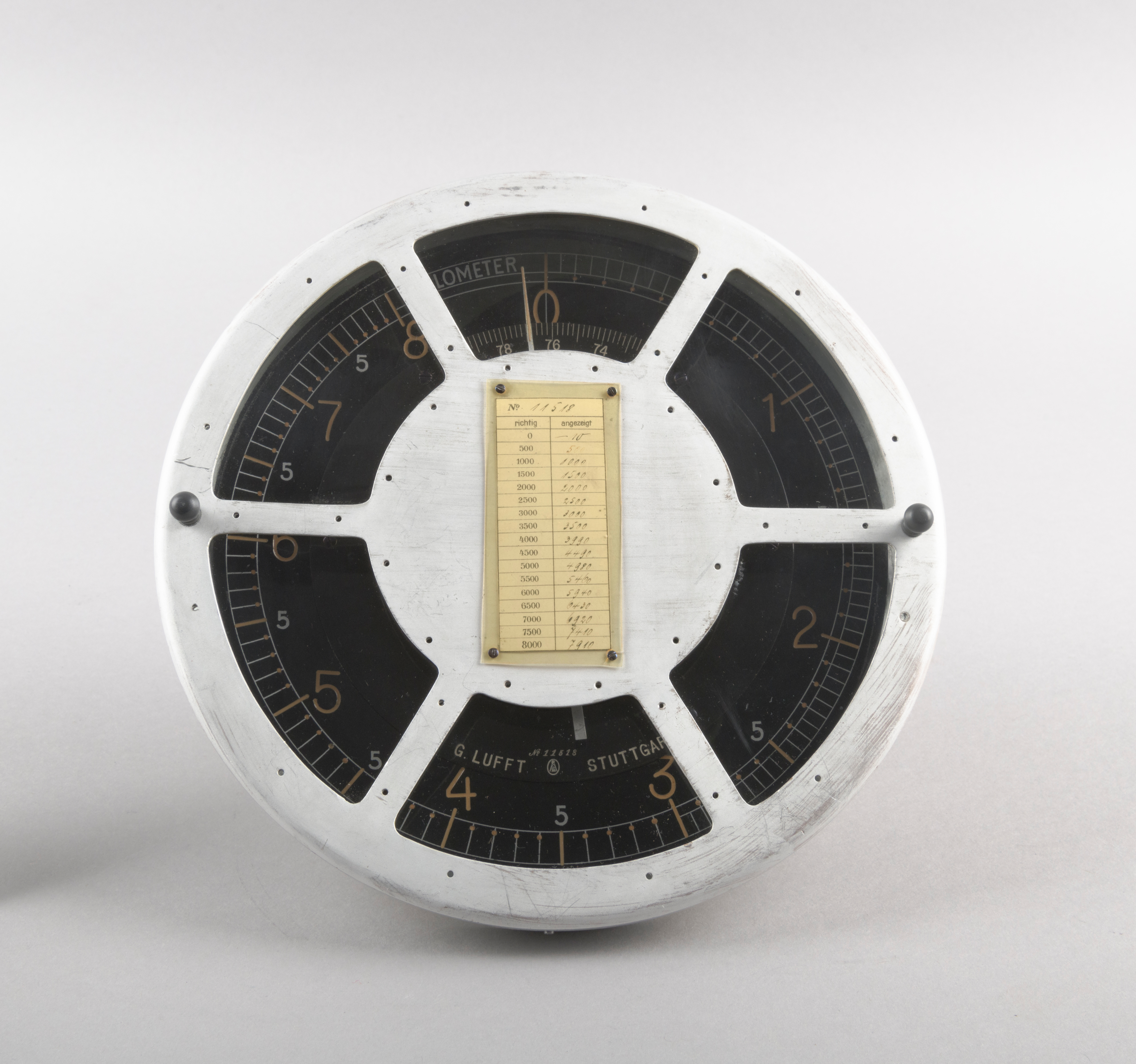
A zeppelin altimeter from World War I. The dial, previously painted with a luminescent radium paint, has turned yellow due to the degradation of the fluorescent zinc sulfide medium.

Clocks, watches, and instruments dating from the first half of the 20th century, often in military applications, may have been painted with radioactive luminous paint. They are usually no longer luminous; this is not due to radioactive decay of the radium (which has a half-life of 1600 years) but to the fluorescence of the zinc sulfide fluorescent medium being worn out by the radiation from the radium. Originally appearing as white, most radium paint from before the 1960s has tarnished to yellow over time. The radiation dose from an intact device is usually only a hazard when many devices are grouped together or if the device is disassembled or tampered with.

==== Use in electron tubes ====
Radium has been used in electron tubes, such as the Western Electric 346B tube. These devices contain a small amount of radium (in the form of radium bromide) to ionize the fill gas, typically a noble gas like neon or argon. This ionization ensures reliable and consistent operation by providing a steady current when a high voltage is applied, enhancing the device's performance and stability. The radium is sealed within a glass envelope with two electrodes, one of which is coated with the radioactive material to create an ion path between the electrodes.

==== Quackery ====
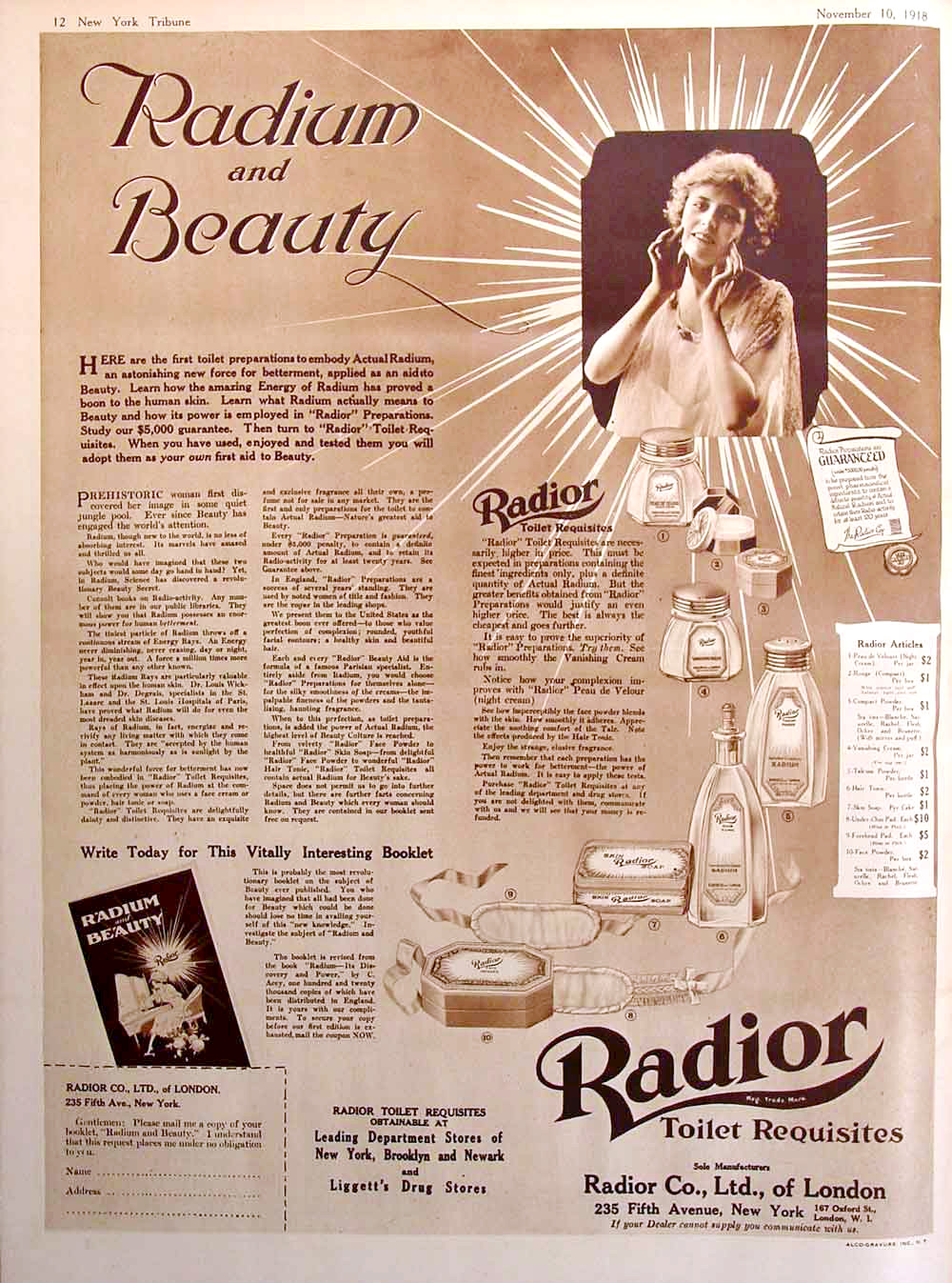
1918 ad for Radior, one of several cosmetic products claiming to contain radium for its purported curative properties

Radium was once an additive in products such as cosmetics, soap, razor blades, and even beverages due to its supposed curative powers. Many contemporary products were falsely advertised as being radioactive. Such products soon fell out of vogue and were prohibited by authorities in many countries after it was discovered they could have serious adverse health effects. (See, for instance, Radithor or Revigator types of "radium water" or "Standard Radium Solution for Drinking".) Spas featuring radium-rich water are still occasionally touted as beneficial, such as those in Misasa, Tottori, Japan, though the sources of radioactivity in these spas vary and may be attributed to radon and other radioisotopes.

==== Medical and research uses ====
Radium (usually in the form of radium chloride or radium bromide) was used in medicine to produce radon gas, which in turn was used as a cancer treatment. Several of these radon sources were used in Canada in the 1920s and 1930s. However, many treatments that were used in the early 1900s are not used anymore because of the harmful effects radium bromide exposure caused. Some examples of these effects are anaemia, cancer, and genetic mutations. As of 2011, safer gamma emitters such as ^{60}Co, which is less costly and available in larger quantities, are usually used to replace the historical use of radium in this application, but factors including increasing costs of cobalt and risks of keeping radioactive sources on site have led to an increase in the use of linear particle accelerators for the same applications.

In the U.S., from 1940 through the 1960s, radium was used in nasopharyngeal radium irradiation, a treatment that was administered to children to treat hearing loss and chronic otitis. The procedure was also administered to airmen and submarine crew to treat barotrauma.

Early in the 1900s, biologists used radium to induce mutations and study genetics. As early as 1904, Daniel MacDougal used radium in an attempt to determine whether it could provoke sudden large mutations and cause major evolutionary shifts. Thomas Hunt Morgan used radium to induce changes resulting in white-eyed fruit flies. Nobel-winning biologist Hermann Muller briefly studied the effects of radium on fruit fly mutations before turning to more affordable x-ray experiments.

== Production ==
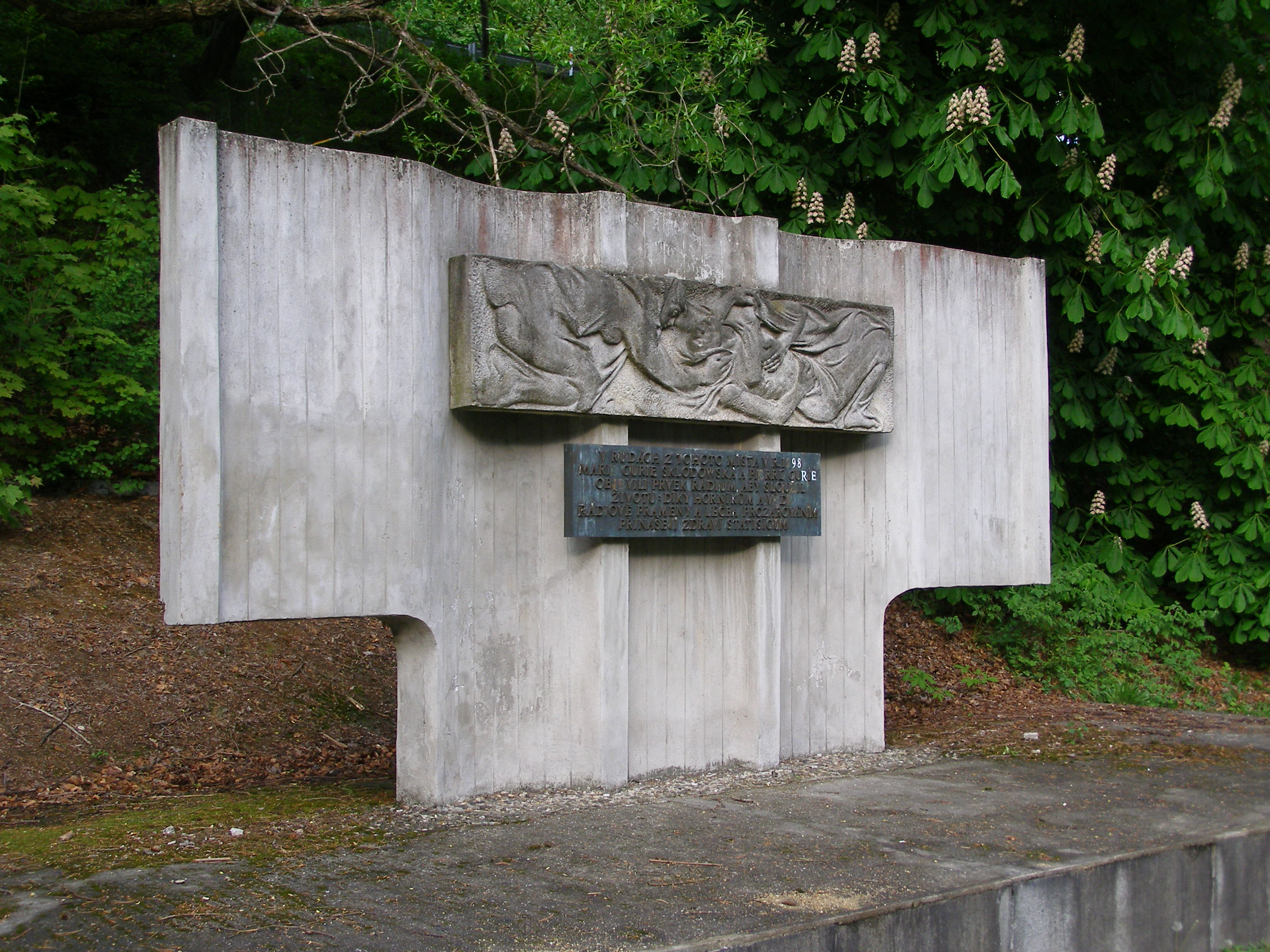
Monument to the Discovery of Radium in Jáchymov

Uranium had no large scale application in the late 19th century and therefore no large uranium mines existed. In the beginning, the silver mines in Jáchymov, Austria-Hungary (now Czech Republic) were the only large sources for uranium ore. The uranium ore was only a byproduct of the mining activities.

In the first extraction of radium, Curie used the residues after extraction of uranium from pitchblende. The uranium had been extracted by dissolution in sulfuric acid leaving radium sulfate, which is similar to barium sulfate but even less soluble in the residues. The residues also contained rather substantial amounts of barium sulfate which thus acted as a carrier for the radium sulfate. The first steps of the radium extraction process involved boiling with sodium hydroxide, followed by hydrochloric acid treatment to minimize impurities of other compounds. The remaining residue was then treated with sodium carbonate to convert the barium sulfate into barium carbonate (carrying the radium), thus making it soluble in hydrochloric acid. After dissolution, the barium and radium were reprecipitated as sulfates; this was then repeated to further purify the mixed sulfate. Some impurities that form insoluble sulfides were removed by treating the chloride solution with hydrogen sulfide, followed by filtering. When the mixed sulfates were pure enough, they were once more converted to mixed chlorides; barium and radium thereafter were separated by fractional crystallisation while monitoring the progress using a spectroscope (radium gives characteristic red lines in contrast to the green barium lines), and the electroscope.

After the isolation of radium by Marie and Pierre Curie from uranium ore from Jáchymov, several scientists started to isolate radium in small quantities. Later, small companies purchased mine tailings from Jáchymov mines and started isolating radium. In 1904, the Austrian government nationalised the mines and stopped exporting raw ore. Until 1912, when radium production increased, radium availability was low.

The formation of an Austrian monopoly and the strong urge of other countries to have access to radium led to a worldwide search for uranium ores. The United States took over as leading producer in the early 1910s, producing 70 g total from 1913 to 1920 in Pittsburgh alone.

The Curies' process was still used for industrial radium extraction in 1940, but mixed bromides were then used for the fractionation. If the barium content of the uranium ore is not high enough, additional barium can be added to carry the radium. These processes were applied to high grade uranium ores but may not have worked well with low grade ores. Small amounts of radium were still extracted from uranium ore by this method of mixed precipitation and ion exchange as late as the 1990s, but as of 2011, it is extracted only from spent nuclear fuel. Pure radium metal is isolated by reducing radium oxide with aluminium metal in a vacuum at 1,200 °C.

In 1954, the total worldwide supply of purified radium amounted to about 5 pounds (2.3 kg). Zaire and Canada were briefly the largest producers of radium in the late 1970s. As of 1997 the chief radium-producing countries were Belgium, Canada, the Czech Republic, Slovakia, the United Kingdom, and Russia. The annual production of radium compounds was only about 100 g in total as of 1984; annual production of radium had reduced to less than 100 g by 2018.

== Modern applications ==
Radium is seeing increasing use in the field of atomic, molecular, and optical physics. Symmetry breaking forces scale proportional to $\ Z^3\ ,$ which makes radium, the heaviest alkaline earth element, well suited for constraining new physics beyond the standard model. Some radium isotopes, such as radium-225, have octupole deformed parity doublets that enhance sensitivity to charge parity violating new physics by two to three orders of magnitude compared to ^{199}Hg.

Radium is also a promising candidate for trapped ion optical clocks. The radium ion has two subhertz-linewidth transitions from the $\ \mathrm{ 7s^2S_{1/2} }\$ ground state that could serve as the clock transition in an optical clock. A ^{226}Ra+ trapped ion atomic clock has been demonstrated on the $\ \mathrm{ 7s^2S_{1/2} }\$ to $\ \mathrm{ 6d^2D_{5/2} }\$ transition, which has been considered for the creation of a transportable optical clock as all transitions necessary for clock operation can be addressed with direct diode lasers at common wavelengths.

Some of the few practical uses of radium are derived from its radioactive properties. More recently discovered radioisotopes, such as cobalt-60 and caesium-137, are replacing radium in even these limited uses because several of these isotopes are more powerful emitters, safer to handle, and available in more concentrated form.

The isotope ^{223}Ra was approved by the United States Food and Drug Administration in 2013 for use in medicine as a cancer treatment of bone metastasis in the form of a solution including radium-223 chloride. The main indication of treatment is the therapy of bony metastases from castration-resistant prostate cancer. ^{225}Ra has also been used in experiments concerning therapeutic irradiation, as it is the only reasonably long-lived radium isotope which does not have radon as one of its daughters.

Radium was still used in 2007 as a radiation source in some industrial radiography devices to check for flawed metallic parts, similarly to X-ray imaging. When mixed with beryllium, radium acts as a neutron source. Up until at least 2004, radium-beryllium neutron sources were still sometimes used, but other materials such as polonium and americium have become more common for use in neutron sources. RaBeF_{4}-based (α, n) neutron sources have been deprecated despite the high number of neutrons they emit (1.84×10^{6} neutrons per second) in favour of ^{241}Am–Be sources. As of 2011, the isotope ^{226}Ra is mainly used to form ^{227}Ac by neutron irradiation in a nuclear reactor.

== Hazards ==
Radium is highly radioactive, as is its immediate decay product, radon gas. When ingested, 80% of the ingested radium leaves the body through the feces, while the other 20% goes into the bloodstream, mostly accumulating in the bones. This is because the body treats radium as calcium and deposits it in the bones, where radioactivity degrades marrow and can mutate bone cells. Exposure to radium, internal or external, can cause cancer and other disorders, because radium and radon emit alpha and gamma rays upon their decay, which kill and mutate cells. Radium is generally considered the most toxic of the radioactive elements.

Some of the biological effects of radium include the first case of "radium-dermatitis", reported in 1900, two years after the element's discovery. The French physicist Antoine Becquerel carried a small ampoule of radium in his waistcoat pocket for six hours and reported that his skin became ulcerated. Pierre Curie attached a tube filled with radium to his arm for ten hours, which resulted in the appearance of a skin lesion, suggesting the use of radium to attack cancerous tissue as it had attacked healthy tissue. Handling of radium has been blamed for Marie Curie's death, due to aplastic anemia, though analysis of her levels of radium exposure done after her death find them within accepted safe levels and attribute her illness and death to her use of radiography. A significant amount of radium's danger comes from its daughter radon, which as a gas can enter the body far more readily than can its parent radium.

=== Regulation ===
The first published recommendations for protection against radium and radiation in general were made by the British X-ray and Radium Protection Committee and were adopted internationally in 1928 at the first meeting of the International Commission on Radiological Protection (ICRP), following preliminary guidance written by the Röntgen Society. This meeting led to further developments of radiation protection programs coordinated across all countries represented by the commission.

Exposure to radium is still regulated internationally by the ICRP, alongside the World Health Organization. The International Atomic Energy Agency (IAEA) publishes safety standards and provides recommendations for the handling of and exposure to radium in its works on naturally occurring radioactive materials and the broader International Basic Safety Standards, which are not enforced by the IAEA but are available for adoption by members of the organization. In addition, in efforts to reduce the quantity of old radiotherapy devices that contain radium, the IAEA has worked since 2022 to manage and recycle disused ^{226}Ra sources.

In several countries, further regulations exist and are applied beyond those recommended by the IAEA and ICRP. For example, in the United States, the Environmental Protection Agency-defined Maximum Contaminant Level for radium is 5 pCi/L for drinking water; at the time of the Manhattan Project in the 1940s, the "tolerance level" for workers was set at 0.1 micrograms of ingested radium. The Occupational Safety and Health Administration does not specifically set exposure limits for radium, and instead limits ionizing radiation exposure in units of roentgen equivalent man based on the exposed area of the body. Radium sources themselves, rather than worker exposures, are regulated more closely by the Nuclear Regulatory Commission, which requires licensing for anyone possessing ^{226}Ra with activity of more than 0.01 μCi. The particular governing bodies that regulate radioactive materials and nuclear energy are documented by the Nuclear Energy Agency for member countries – for instance, in the Republic of Korea, the nation's radiation safety standards are managed by the Korea Radioisotope Institute, established in 1985, and the Korea Institute of Nuclear Safety, established in 1990 – and the IAEA leads efforts in establishing governing bodies in locations that do not have government regulations on radioactive materials.
