= Radium chlorate =

Identifiers
| CAS Number | 98966-82-6 |
| 3D model (JSmol) | Interactive image |
- InChI: InChI=1S/2ClHO3.Ra/c2*2-1(3)4;/h2*(H,2,3,4);/q;;+2/p-2 Key: VTNHQTZHOLOTIS-UHFFFAOYSA-L; InChI=1/Ra.2ClHO3/c;2*2-1(3)4/h;2*(H,2,3,4)/q+2;;/p-2
- SMILES: [Ra+2].[O-]Cl(=O)=O.[O-]Cl(=O)=O

Properties
| Chemical formula | Ra(ClO_{3})_{2} |

Related compounds
| Related compounds | Barium chlorate |
- Except where otherwise noted, data are given for materials in their standard state (at 25 °C [77 °F], 100 kPa). Infobox references

Radium chlorate is an inorganic compound with formula Ra(ClO_{3})_{2}.

While pure radium chlorate has never been prepared, it is known to form coprecipitates using barium chlorate as a carrier. These react with excess ammoniacal ammonium carbonate to form a mixed precipitate of radium carbonate with barium carbonate.

Predicted values of its thermodynamic properties are available from Lowson (1985).

== Synthesis ==
Solutions containing radium chlorate may be obtained by dissolving soluble radium salts in a solution of barium chlorate:

Ra^{2+} + Ba(ClO_{3})_{2} → Ra(ClO_{3})_{2} + Ba^{2+}

== Applications ==
It is claimed to have application in the production of self luminous watch components.
