= Radium nitrate =

Names
- Other names: Radium(II) nitrate; Radium dinitrate

Identifiers
CAS Number	10213-12-4
3D model (JSmol)	Interactive image
ChemSpider	67037400
- InChI: InChI=1S/2NO3.Ra/c2*2-1(3)4;/q2*-1;+2 Key: AMLSLPXXUHKKSF-UHFFFAOYSA-N
- SMILES: [Ra+2].[O-][N+]([O-])=O.[O-][N+]([O-])=O

Properties
Chemical formula	Ra(NO_{3})_{2}
Molar mass	350.01 g/mol
Appearance	White solid
Melting point	280 °C (536 °F; 553 K) (decomposes)
Solubility in water	13.9 g/100 ml
Solubility in nitric acid	Insoluble

Related compounds
Other anions	Radium carbonate
Other cations	Barium nitrate
- Except where otherwise noted, data are given for materials in their standard state (at 25 °C [77 °F], 100 kPa). Infobox references

Radium nitrate is a radioactive salt with the formula Ra(NO_{3})_{2}. It is a white solid, but old samples appear yellowish-grey. Although radium chloride and radium bromide are less soluble than the corresponding barium salts, radium nitrate is more soluble than barium nitrate. It decomposes at 280 °C to radium oxide.

== Production ==
Radium nitrate is produced by the reaction of radium carbonate or radium sulfate with nitric acid:

RaCO_{3} + HNO_{3} → Ra(NO_{3})_{2} + CO_{2} + H_{2}O
