= Boole (crater) =

Lunar impact crater

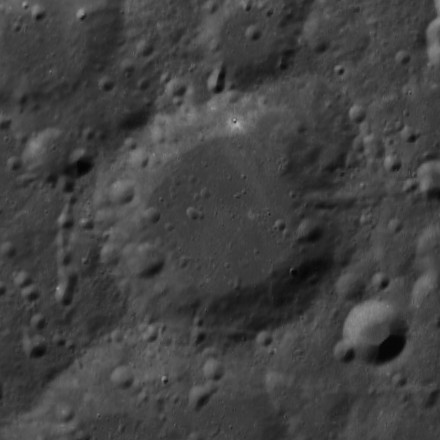
- LRO mosaic
- Coordinates: 63.7°N 87.4°W
- Diameter: 61.34 km (38.11 mi)
- Depth: Unknown
- Colongitude: 89° at sunrise
- Eponym: George Boole

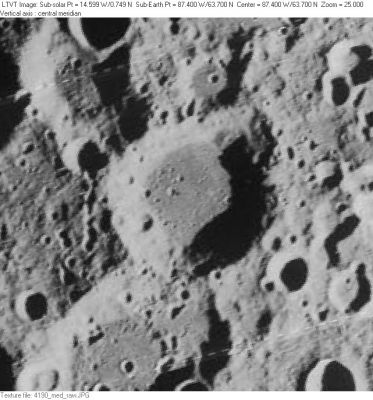
Lunar Orbiter 4 image

Boole is a lunar impact crater that lies along the northwestern limb of the Moon, to the northwest of the crater Gerard. At this location it is viewed nearly from the side, and is very oblong in shape due to foreshortening. The crater formation is nearly circular, however, with a wide inner wall that has been worn and rounded due to subsequent impacts. It can only be observed a day or two before a full moon on a favorable libration.

To the north of Boole is the crater Cremona, and to the southwest are Paneth and Smoluchowski. The eroded and somewhat distorted satellite crater Boole E is attached to the southern rim of Boole, forming a saddle-shaped valley between the two formations. The interior floor of Boole is relatively flat, and marked only by tiny craterlets. There is a small craterlet on the floor next to the southwest rim, and a tiny crater along the western inner wall.

The surface along the western face of Boole is pock-marked by a multitude of small craterlets that run in a northerly direction towards Brianchon. A sequence of these impacts forms a short catena, or crater chain, near the western rim of Boole.

This crater is named after English mathematician George Boole (1815–1864). His name was introduced into lunar nomenclature by David W. G. Arthur and Ewen Whitaker with the Rectified Lunar Atlas (1963). Its designation was officially adopted by the International Astronomical Union in 1964.

== Satellite craters ==
By convention these features are identified on lunar maps by placing the letter on the side of the crater midpoint that is closest to Boole.

Boole	Latitude	Longitude	Diameter
A	63.6° N	80.6° W	56 km
B	63.6° N	77.3° W	9 km
C	65.4° N	82.5° W	18 km
D	64.0° N	83.5° W	10 km
E	62.9° N	84.6° W	16 km
F	64.2° N	79.4° W	34 km
G	64.8° N	90.9° W	41 km
H	61.6° N	88.9° W	75 km
R	64.4° N	78.0° W	13 km

Boole B and H include permanently shadowed regions.
