= Zsigmondy (crater) =

Crater on the Moon

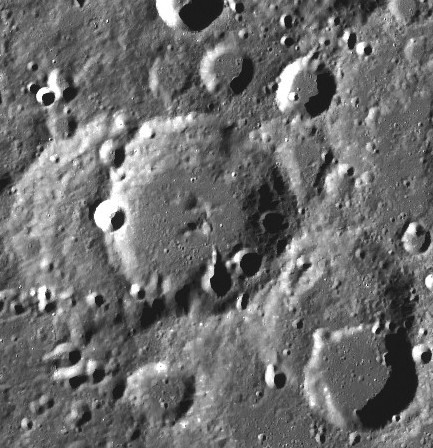
- LRO image
- Coordinates: 59.52°N 105.30°W
- Diameter: 66.88 km (41.56 mi)
- Depth: Unknown
- Colongitude: 106° at sunrise
- Eponym: Richard A. Zsigmondy

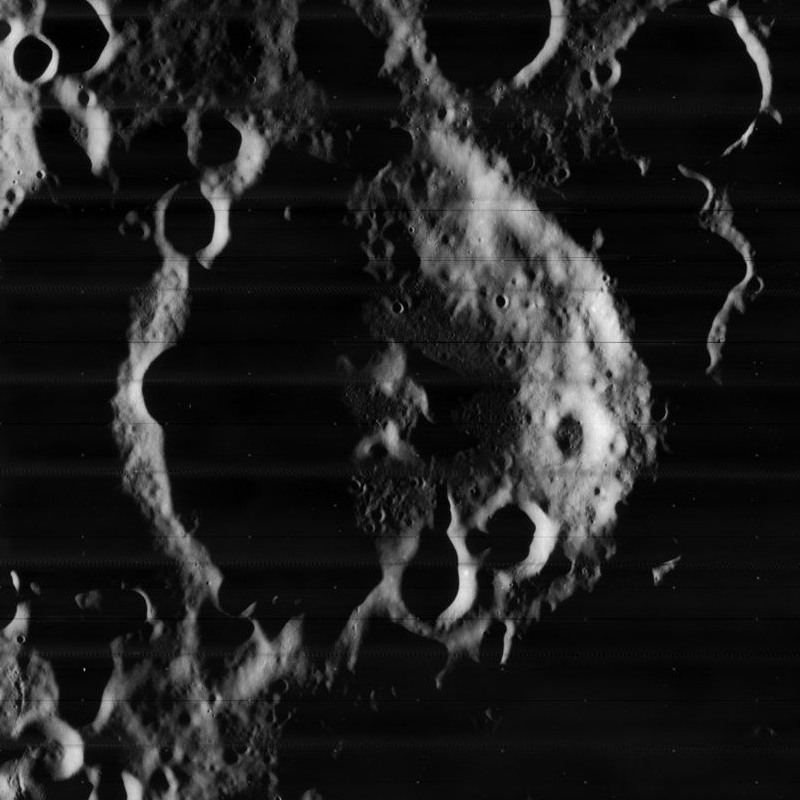
Lunar Orbiter 5 image

Zsigmondy is a lunar impact crater located beyond the northwestern limb on the far side of the Moon. Attached to the southeastern rim of the crater is the crater Omar Khayyam, which lies within the much larger Poczobutt. Farther to the east, along the north rim of Poczobutt, is Smoluchowski.

The rim of Zsigmondy is eroded and distorted in form, having a somewhat polygonal outline. It overlies a comparably sized crater formation Zsigmondy S along the western rim. A pair of small craters lies across the low western rim, and another pair is situated on the inner wall to the southeast. On the interior, the floor is relatively flat in the western half with a low central rise near the midpoint.

The crater was named in 1976 after Austrian chemist and Nobel laureate Richard Adolf Zsigmondy.

== Satellite craters ==
By convention these features are identified on lunar maps by placing the letter on the side of the crater midpoint that is closest to Zsigmondy.

Zsigmondy	Latitude	Longitude	Diameter
A	62.8° N	102.6° W	63 km
S	59.7° N	106.7° W	64 km
Z	62.1° N	104.9° W	23 km

== See also ==
- Richard Adolf Zsigmondy
