= Francium compounds =

Compounds containing at least one atom of francium

Francium compounds are compounds containing the element francium (Fr). Due to francium being very unstable, its salts are only known to a small extent. Francium coprecipitates with several caesium salts, such as caesium perchlorate, which results in small amounts of francium perchlorate. This coprecipitation can be used to isolate francium, by adapting the radiocaesium coprecipitation method of Lawrence E. Glendenin and C. M. Nelson. It will additionally coprecipitate with many other caesium salts, including the iodate, the picrate, the tartrate (also rubidium tartrate), the chloroplatinate, and the silicotungstate. It also coprecipitates with silicotungstic acid, and with perchloric acid, without another alkali metal as a carrier, which leads to other methods of separation.

== Halides ==
Francium halides are all soluble in water and are expected to be white solids. They are expected to be produced by the reaction of the corresponding halogens. For example, francium chloride would be produced by the reaction of francium and chlorine. Francium chloride has been studied as a pathway to separate francium from other elements, by using the high vapour pressure of the compound, although francium fluoride would have a higher vapour pressure.

== Other compounds ==
Francium nitrate, sulfate, hydroxide, carbonate, acetate, and oxalate are all soluble in water, while the iodate, picrate, tartrate, chloroplatinate, and silicotungstate are insoluble. The insoluble compounds are used to extract francium from other radioactive products, such as zirconium, niobium, molybdenum, tin, and antimony, using the method mentioned in the section above. The CsFr molecule is predicted to have francium at the negative end of the dipole, unlike all known heterodiatomic alkali metal molecules. Francium superoxide (FrO_{2}) is expected to have a more covalent character than its lighter congeners; this is attributed to the 6p electrons in francium being more involved in the francium–oxygen bonding. The relativistic destabilisation of the 6p_{3/2} spinor may make francium compounds in oxidation states higher than +1 possible, such as [Fr^{V}F_{6}]^{−}; but this has not been experimentally confirmed. Francium perchlorate is produced by the reaction of francium chloride and sodium perchlorate. The francium perchlorate coprecipitates with caesium perchlorate. This coprecipitation can be used to isolate francium, by adapting the radiocaesium coprecipitation method of Lawrence E. Glendenin and C. M. Nelson. However, this method is unreliable in separating thallium, which also coprecipitates with caesium. Francium perchlorate's entropy is expected to be 42.7 e.u (178.7 J mol^{−1} K^{−1}).

The only double salt known of francium has the formula Fr_{9}Bi_{2}I_{9}.

== See also ==
- Caesium compounds
- Radium compounds
