= Radium iodate =

Names
- Preferred IUPAC name Radium iodate

Identifiers
3D model (JSmol)	Interactive image
- InChI: InChI=1S/Ra.2HIO3/c;2*2-1(3)4/h;2*(H,2,3,4)/q+2;;/p-2 Key: VAIVKVGPUBOYAD-UHFFFAOYSA-L
- SMILES: [Ra+2].[O-]I(=O)=O.[O-]I(=O)=O

Properties
Chemical formula	I_{2}O_{6}Ra
Molar mass	576 g·mol^{−1}
Appearance	colorless solid
Solubility in water	0.437 g/L (25 °C)

Related compounds
Related compounds	Barium iodate
- Except where otherwise noted, data are given for materials in their standard state (at 25 °C [77 °F], 100 kPa). Infobox references

Radium iodate is an inorganic compound, a salt of radium and iodic acid with the chemical formula Ra(IO_{3})_{2}.

== Synthesis ==
Radium iodate is obtained by the reaction of a soluble radium salt and potassium iodate:

RaCl_{2} + 2KIO_{3} → Ra(IO_{3})_{2} + 2KCl

== Physical properties ==
Radium iodate forms colorless crystals. It is poorly soluble in water.
