= Poczobutt (crater) =

Crater on the Moon

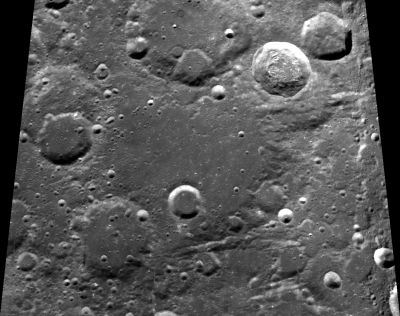
- Clementine mosaic
- Coordinates: 57.27°N 99.23°W
- Diameter: 212.36 km (131.95 mi)
- Depth: Unknown
- Colongitude: 104° at sunrise
- Eponym: Marcin Odlanicki-Poczobutt

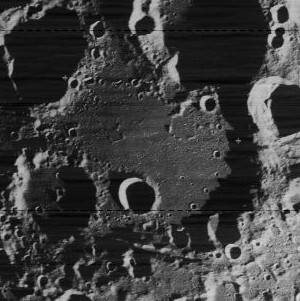
Lunar Orbiter 4 image

Poczobutt is a large lunar impact crater that is located on the far side of the Moon, just beyond the northwestern limb in an area occasionally brought into sight due to libration effects. It dates to the Pre-Nectarian period of the lunar geologic timescale. The crater was named in 1979 after Polish astronomer Marcin Odlanicki-Poczobutt.

This is a damaged formation that is partly overlain by several named craters. Across the rim to the north-northeast is the crater Smoluchowski. The crater Zsigmondy overlies the northeastern rim, and Omar Khayyam is located in the western part of Poczobutt's interior.

Little of the outer rim of this crater remains intact, and what survives is worn and eroded. The outer rim now forms an irregular ring of peaks, broken in several locations by small craters. The most intact portion of the rim is a small arc along the eastern side. Likewise much of the interior floor is irregular due to overlying impacts or their ejecta. However, there is a level plain in the eastern half of the interior that is almost flat and featureless. This region is marked only by a few low ridges around the fringes and some tiny craterlets. A small crater at the southern edge of this plain has a flooded, featureless interior.

Most of the crater formations associated with Poczobutt are almost as eroded as the main crater. However Smoluchowski H, along the outer rim to the northeast, has a sharp, well-defined rim, some terraces along the inner wall, and a higher albedo compared to the surrounding terrain.

== Satellite craters ==
By convention these features are identified on lunar maps by placing the letter on the side of the crater midpoint that is closest to Poczobutt.

Poczobutt	Latitude	Longitude	Diameter
J	56.6° N	96.8° W	24 km
R	56.0° N	103.5° W	39 km
