= Eugen Glueckauf =

German-Jewish atomic chemist

Eugen Glueckauf FRS
- Born: Eugen Glückauf; 9 April 1906; Eisenach, German Empire
- Died: 12 September 1981 (aged 75); Chilton, Berkshire, England
- Occupations: Research chemist and nuclear energy expert
- Spouse: Irma Elise Auguste Trepper
- Children: Barbara

Eugen Glueckauf FRS (9 April 1906 – 12 September 1981) was a German-born British expert on nuclear power.

== Biography ==
Eugen Glückauf (later anglicised to Glueckauf) was born on 9 April 1906 in Eisenach, Germany, the son of Bruno Glückauf, a clothier, and Elsa Pretzfelder.

At school, Glückauf was particularly adept at maths. His university training began at the University of Berlin but he switched to the Technische Hochschule at Charlottenburg, where he graduated in 1930 and, after two years' research, he gained his doctorate (Dr Ing).

With the political and economic climate in Germany worsening, Glückauf left for England where, at first, life for him was not easy either. After failed first attempts, an introduction by Professor Freundlich at University College led him to Professor F. A. Paneth, who was looking for an assistant at the Royal College of Science (Imperial College). The first research problem he tackled involved analytical determination of helium in air. This involved quantitatively separating helium and neon, present in air at four times the level. This was finally solved by a twelve-stage adsorption—desorption cascade.

Paneth moved to Durham as professor of chemistry in 1938. Glückauf joined him, but for four months in 1940 was interned in the Isle of Man. Paneth helped secure his release, and provided him with a two-year grant from the DSIR. This enabled Glückauf to work on the ozone content in the atmosphere.

In 1944 Glückauf was invited to join the Department of "Tube Alloys" – code for work on atomic energy – involving the use of ion-exchange and gas chromatography to separate isotopes. In the following year he was awarded an MSc by the University of London.

In addition to over 100 scholarly articles, he published Atomic Energy Waste in 1961; it became a standard reference. In addition to the topics already mentioned he contributed in the fields of radio chemistry and electrolyte solution chemistry. He was elected a fellow of the Royal Society in 1969.

=== Family ===
Eugen Glückauf married Irma Elise Auguste Trepper, also from Germany, in Surrey in 1934. In a Transcript of Manuscrpt Biographical Notes he recorded that "Early in 1935 I sent my wife a telegram: 'Can you learn English shorthand? You've got three days.' She did – just – and after that got a part-time job as Paneth's secretary, where she worked until 1938 when our daughter [Barbara] was born."

Glueckauf (having by now anglicised his name) was given a Certificate of Naturalization in Durham on 14 May 1946; Irma received hers on the 17th. He died on 12 September 1981 and his wife on 3 September 1989, both in the village of Chilton, then in Berkshire.
