= Kurt Peters (chemist) =

Austrian chemist (1897–1978)

Kurt Gustav Karl Peters (17 August 1897 – 23 May 1978) was an Austrian chemist. His work focused on the area of fuel technology, physical chemistry and catalytic reactions as well as the separation of rare gases and hydrocarbons.

== History ==
After serving in the Austrian army during World War I, he studied chemistry at the Technical University of Vienna (Vienna TH, today Vienna University of Technology) between 1918 and 1921. In 1923 he earned his doctorate at the University of Berlin under Walther Nernst.

In 1927, Peters and Friedrich Paneth published their results on the transformation of hydrogen to helium, now known as Cold fusion. They later retracted the results, saying they had measured background helium from the air.

After working for a number of years as an assistant, in 1928 he was promoted to Head of Department at the Kaiser Wilhelm Institute for Coal Research. In 1937 he moved into industry and worked in the department of experimental high-IG Farben under Matthias Pier in the field of catalyst development.

After the Second World War, the American military government appointed him as trustee for a portion of the confiscated property of the Company IG Farben. In 1949 he returned to academia, and was appointed as professor at the Department of ordinary fuel at TH Vienna. From 1952 to 1954 he was Dean of the chemistry department and in the years 1955 and 1956, Rector of the TH Vienna.
