= Radium hydroxide =

Identifiers
CAS Number	98966-86-0
3D model (JSmol)	Interactive image
ChemSpider	66737595
- InChI: InChI=1S/2H2O.Ra/h2*1H2;/q;;+2/p-2 Key: ARVNHJBMBBFPCP-UHFFFAOYSA-L
- SMILES: [Ra+2].[O-H].[O-H]

Properties
Chemical formula	H_{2}O_{2}Ra
Molar mass	260 g·mol^{−1}
Appearance	colorless crystals
Solubility in water	soluble

Related compounds
Related compounds	Barium hydroxide
- Except where otherwise noted, data are given for materials in their standard state (at 25 °C [77 °F], 100 kPa). Infobox references

Radium hydroxide is an inorganic compound of radium, hydrogen, and oxygen with the chemical formula Ra(OH)_{2}. Stability constant of aqueous RaOH^{+} ion pair at zero ionic strength is equal to 5.

== Synthesis ==
- A reaction of radium metal with water:

Ra + 2H_{2}O → Ra(HO)_{2} + H_{2}

- The reaction of radium oxide and water can also generate radium hydroxide, and the reaction releases a lot of heat:

RaO + H_{2}O → Ra(HO)_{2}

- The compound can also be prepared by reacting radium nitrate with NaOH in solution.

== Physical properties ==
Radium hydroxide forms colorless crystals that dissolve in water better than does barium hydroxide, and has more basic properties.

The compound forms a hydrate of the composition Ra(OH)_{2}·8H_{2}O.

Radium hydroxide is a caustic, toxic, and corrosive substance. It is significantly more toxic than barium hydroxide (Ba(OH)_{2}) and strontium hydroxide (Sr(OH)_{2}).
