= Omar Khayyam (crater) =

Crater on the Moon

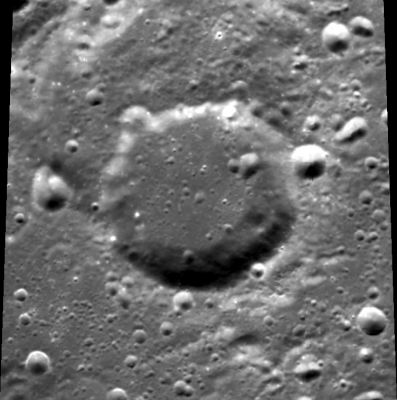
- Clementine mosaic
- Coordinates: 58.021°N 102.22°W
- Diameter: 68.64 km (42.65 mi)
- Depth: Unknown
- Colongitude: 104° at sunrise
- Eponym: Omar Khayyám

Omar Khayyam is a lunar impact crater that is located just beyond the northwestern limb of the Moon, on the far side from the Earth. It lies in a region of the surface that is sometimes brought into view of the Earth due to libration, and under favorable lighting it can be viewed from the edge. However under such circumstances not much detail can be seen, and the crater is best viewed from orbit.

This feature is located at the western edge of the larger walled plain called Poczobutt, and the northwestern rim of Omar Khayyam is overlain by the crater Zsigmondy. The east-southeastern part of the interior floor of Omar Khayyam is overlain by a smaller and younger crater. The remainder of the interior floor is split in half by a ridge attached to the western outer rim of this crater, giving Omar Khayyam the appearance of a formation composed of multiple merged impacts.

The outer rim of Omar Khayyam is heavily eroded and has a wide gap to the southeast. A small crater overlies the western rim and multiple small craterlets mark the sides and parts of the interior. The floor to the southwest is somewhat smoother than elsewhere.

This crater was named in 1970 in honor of the Persian mathematician and astronomer Omar Khayyam.
