= Beryllium carbonate =

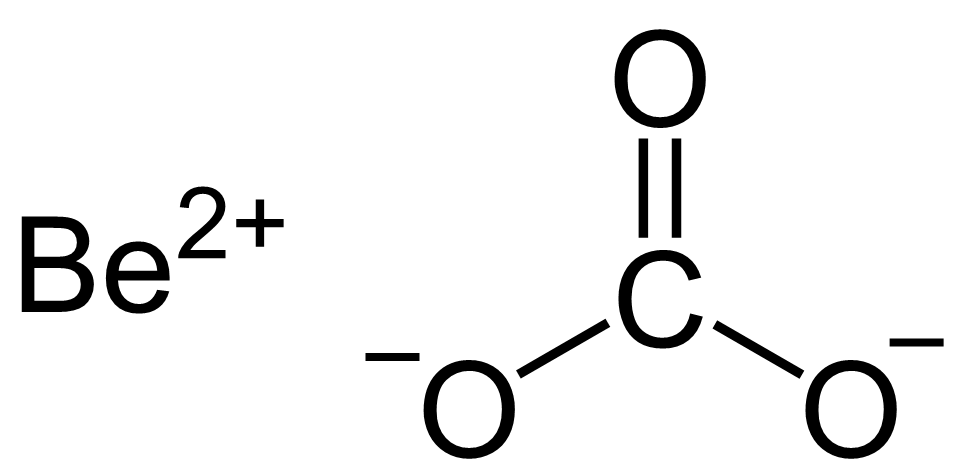

Identifiers
CAS Number	13106-47-3
3D model (JSmol)	Interactive image
ChemSpider	55490
ECHA InfoCard	100.032.740
EC Number	236-030-8
PubChem CID	61577
RTECS number	DS2350000
UNII	UBA86J65UH
UN number	1566
CompTox Dashboard (EPA)	DTXSID90884573
- InChI: InChI=1S/CH2O3.Be/c2-1(3)4;/h(H2,2,3,4);/q;+2/p-2 Key: ZBUQRSWEONVBES-UHFFFAOYSA-L; InChI=1/CH2O3.Be/c2-1(3)4;/h(H2,2,3,4);/q;+2/p-2 Key: ZBUQRSWEONVBES-NUQVWONBAN
- SMILES: [Be+2].[O-]C([O-])=O

Properties
Chemical formula	BeCO_{3}
Molar mass	69.020 g·mol^{−1}
Melting point	54 °C (129 °F; 327 K)
Boiling point	100 °C (212 °F; 373 K) decomposes
Solubility in water	0.36 g/100 mL

Thermochemistry
Heat capacity (C)	65 J/mol·K
Std molar entropy (S^{⦵}_{298})	52 J/mol·K
Std enthalpy of formation (Δ_{f}H^{⦵}_{298})	−1025 kJ/mol
Gibbs free energy (Δ_{f}G^{⦵})	−948 kJ/mol

Hazards
- Occupational safety and health (OHS/OSH)
Main hazards	Toxic (T) Irritant (Xi); Dangerous for the environment (N)
- GHS labelling
Pictograms	(GHS06: Toxic) (GHS08: Health hazard) (GHS09: Environmental hazard)
Signal word	Danger
Hazard statements	H301, H315, H317, H319, H330, H335, H350i, H372, H411
NFPA 704 (fire diamond)	3 0 0
- Lethal dose or concentration (LD, LC)
LD_{50} (median dose)	150 mg/kg (guinea pig)
- NIOSH (US health exposure limits)
PEL (Permissible)	TWA 0.002 mg/m^{3} C 0.005 mg/m^{3} (30 minutes), with a maximum peak of 0.025 mg/m^{3} (as Be)
REL (Recommended)	Ca C 0.0005 mg/m^{3} (as Be)
IDLH (Immediate danger)	Ca [4 mg/m^{3} (as Be)]

Related compounds
Other cations	Magnesium carbonate Calcium carbonate Strontium carbonate Barium carbonate Radium carbonate
- Except where otherwise noted, data are given for materials in their standard state (at 25 °C [77 °F], 100 kPa). verify (what is ?) Infobox references

Beryllium carbonate is a chemical compound with the chemical formula BeCO_{3}.

== Structures ==
There are three forms reported, anhydrous, tetrahydrate and basic beryllium carbonate. The anhydrous form is reported to be unstable, decomposing to BeO and carbon dioxide, and requiring storage under CO_{2}. The tetrahydrate is said to be formed when CO_{2} is bubbled through a solution of Be(OH)_{2} and is also reported to be similarly unstable.

== Preparation ==
Basic beryllium carbonate is a mixed salt, which can be prepared by the reaction of beryllium sulfate and ammonium carbonate, and contains both carbonate and hydroxide ions, with formula Be_{2}CO_{3}(OH)_{2}. It is believed that in the older literature this is probably what was referred to as beryllium carbonate.

== Safety ==
It may cause irritation. Toxic. It should be handled carefully since several related beryllium compounds are known carcinogens.

== Natural occurrence ==
No formations of purely beryllium carbonate are known to occur naturally. The only Be-rich carbonate mineral currently known is niveolanite.
