= Radium nitride =

Identifiers
3D model (JSmol)	Interactive image
- InChI: InChI=1S/2N.3Ra/q2*-3;3*+2 Key: LMYGLQBCPKIIGH-UHFFFAOYSA-N
- SMILES: [Ra+2].[Ra+2].[Ra+2].[N-3].[N-3]

Properties
Chemical formula	N_{2}Ra_{3}
Molar mass	706 g·mol^{−1}
Appearance	black solid

Related compounds
Related compounds	Barium nitride
- Except where otherwise noted, data are given for materials in their standard state (at 25 °C [77 °F], 100 kPa). Infobox references

Radium nitride is an inorganic compound of radium and nitrogen with the chemical formula Ra_{3}N_{2}.

== Synthesis ==
The compound can be obtained by absorption of N_{2} by metallic radium:

3Ra + N_{2} → Ra_{3}N_{2}

== Physical properties ==
The compound forms a black solid.
