= Radium fluoride =

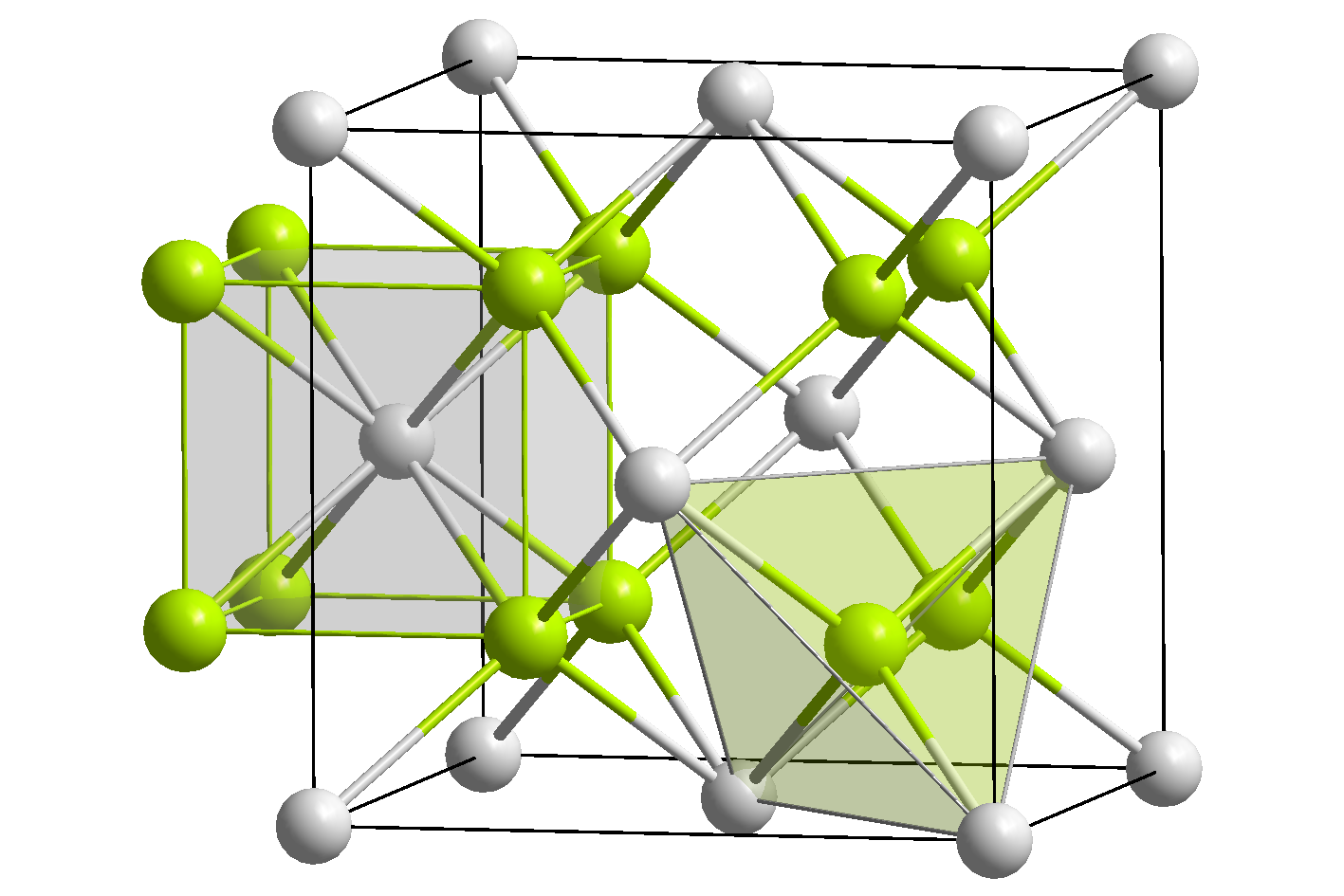
- Ra^{2+} F^{−}

Identifiers
CAS Number	20610-49-5
3D model (JSmol)	Interactive image
CompTox Dashboard (EPA)	DTXSID201314189
- InChI: InChI=1S/2FH.Ra/h2*1H;/q;;+2/p-2 Key: FSYYCDYDQQAUCW-UHFFFAOYSA-L
- SMILES: F[Ra]F

Properties
Chemical formula	RaF_{2}
Molar mass	263.8214 g/mol
Appearance	White cubic crystals
Density	6.7 g/cm^{3}

Hazards
- Occupational safety and health (OHS/OSH)
Main hazards	Highly radioactive and toxic
- GHS labelling
Pictograms	(GHS08: Health hazard)
Hazard statements	H350
- Except where otherwise noted, data are given for materials in their standard state (at 25 °C [77 °F], 100 kPa). Infobox references

Radium fluoride is an inorganic compound with a chemical formula of RaF_{2}. This salt, like all radium compounds, is highly radioactive. It can be coprecipitated with lanthanide fluorides. Radium fluoride has the same crystal form as calcium fluoride (fluorite). However, calculations suggest that radium fluoride vapor consists of RaF_{2} molecules, with a bond angle of 118°, due to substantial covalent interaction within the molecule.

== See also ==
- Vasiliu, Monica; Hill, J. Grant; Peterson, Kirk A.; Dixon, David A. (2018-01-11). "Structures and Heats of Formation of Simple Alkaline Earth Metal Compounds II: Fluorides, Chlorides, Oxides, and Hydroxides for Ba, Sr, and Ra" (PDF). The Journal of Physical Chemistry A. 122 (1): 316–327. Bibcode:2018JPCA..122..316V. doi:10.1021/acs.jpca.7b09056. ISSN 1089-5639. OSTI 1539153. PMID 29240428.
