= Radium chloride =

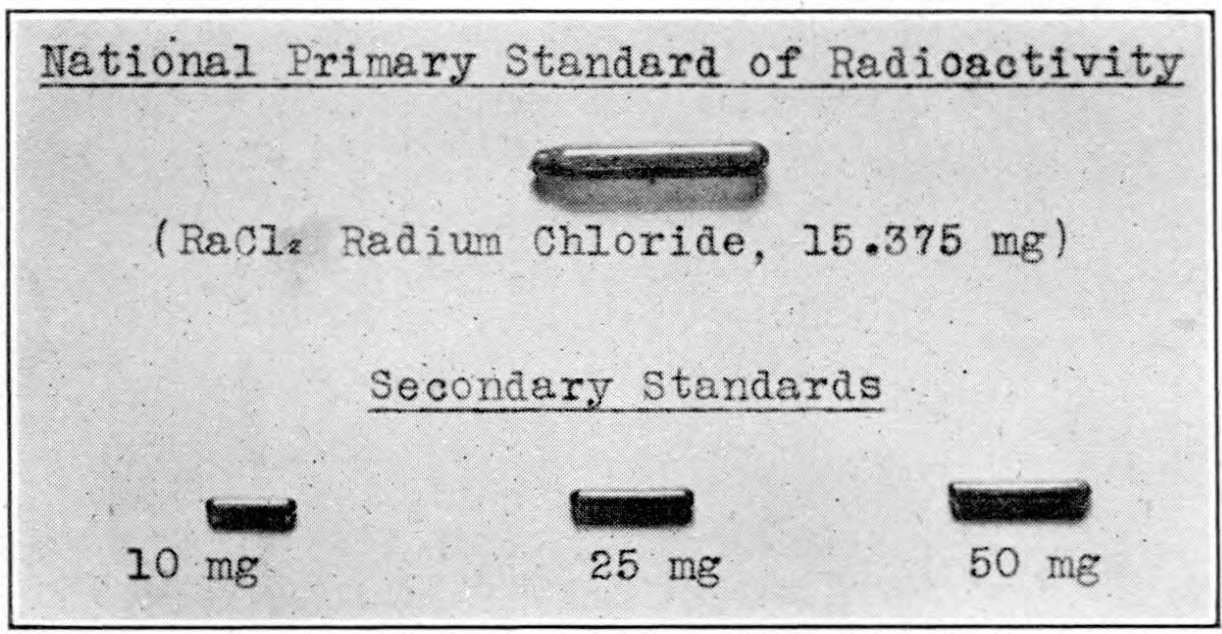

Identifiers
CAS Number	10025-66-8
3D model (JSmol)	Interactive image
ChemSpider	20138060
ECHA InfoCard	100.030.020
EC Number	233-035-7
UNII	KKO873WR2Z
CompTox Dashboard (EPA)	DTXSID00893671
- InChI: InChI=1S/2ClH.Ra/h2*1H;/q;;+2/p-2 Key: RWRDJVNMSZYMDV-UHFFFAOYSA-L; InChI=1/2ClH.Ra/h2*1H;/q;;+2/p-2 Key: RWRDJVNMSZYMDV-NUQVWONBAG
- SMILES: Cl[Ra]Cl

Properties
Chemical formula	RaCl_{2}
Molar mass	296.094 g/mol
Appearance	Colorless solid, glows blue-green
Density	4.9 g/cm^{3}
Melting point	900 °C (1,650 °F; 1,170 K)
Solubility in water	245 g/L (20 °C)

Hazards
- Occupational safety and health (OHS/OSH)
Main hazards	radioactive, highly toxic, corrosive
- GHS labelling
Pictograms	(GHS06: Toxic) (GHS08: Health hazard) (GHS09: Environmental hazard)
Hazard statements	H300, H310, H330, H350, H370, H373, H410
NFPA 704 (fire diamond)	4 0 1

Related compounds
Other anions	Radium fluoride Radium bromide Radium iodide
Other cations	Beryllium chloride Magnesium chloride Calcium chloride Strontium chloride Barium chloride
- Except where otherwise noted, data are given for materials in their standard state (at 25 °C [77 °F], 100 kPa). verify (what is ?) Infobox references

Radium chloride is an inorganic compound with the chemical formula RaCl_{2}. It is a radium salt of hydrogen chloride. It was the first radium compound isolated in a pure state. Marie Curie and André-Louis Debierne used it in their original separation of radium from barium. The first preparation of radium metal was by the electrolysis of a solution of this salt using a mercury cathode.

== Preparation ==
Radium chloride crystallises from aqueous solution as the dihydrate. The dihydrate is dehydrated by heating to 100 °C in air for one hour followed by 5.5 hours at 520 °C under argon. If the presence of other anions is suspected, the dehydration may be effectuated by fusion under hydrogen chloride.

Radium chloride can also be prepared by heating radium bromide in a flow of dry hydrogen chloride gas. It can be produced by treating radium carbonate with hydrochloric acid.

== Properties ==
Radium chloride is a colorless salt with a blue-green luminescence, especially when heated. Its color gradually changes to yellow with aging, whereas contamination by barium may impart a rose tint. It is less soluble in water than other alkaline earth metal chlorides – at 25 °C its solubility is 245 g/L whereas that of barium chloride is 307 g/L, and the difference is even larger in hydrochloric acid solutions. This property is used in the first stages of the separation of radium from barium by fractional crystallization. Radium chloride is only sparingly soluble in azeotropic hydrochloric acid and virtually insoluble in concentrated hydrochloric acid.

Gaseous RaCl_{2} shows strong absorptions in the visible spectrum at 676.3 nm and 649.8 nm (red): the dissociation energy of the radium–chlorine bond is estimated as 2.9 eV, and its length as 292 pm.

Contrary to diamagnetic barium chloride, radium chloride is weakly paramagnetic with a magnetic susceptibility of 1.05×10^{−6}. Its flame color is red.

== Uses ==
Radium chloride is still used for the initial stages of the separation of radium from barium during the extraction of radium from pitchblende. The large quantities of material involved (to extract a gram of pure radium metal, about 7 tonnes of pitchblende is required) favour this less costly (but less efficient) method over those based on radium bromide or radium chromate (used for the later stages of the separation).

It was also used in medicine to produce radon gas which in turn was used as a brachytheraputic cancer treatment.

Radium-223 dichloride (USP, radium chloride Ra 223), tradename Xofigo (formerly Alpharadin), is an alpha-emitting radiopharmaceutical. Bayer received FDA approval for this drug to treat castration-resistant prostate cancer with bone metastases in May 2013. The dose in ranges from 46-250 kBq/kg.

== Bibliography ==
- Gmelins Handbuch der anorganischen Chemie (8. Aufl.), Berlin:Verlag Chemie, 1928, pp. 60–61.
- Weigel, Fritz [in German] (1977). Gmelin Handbuch der anorganischen Chemie (8. Aufl. 2. Ergänzungsband). Gmelin Handbook of Inorganic Chemistry (8th ed.). Berlin: Springer. p. 362–364. ISBN 978-3-540-93335-9.
