= Paneth (crater) =

Crater on the Moon

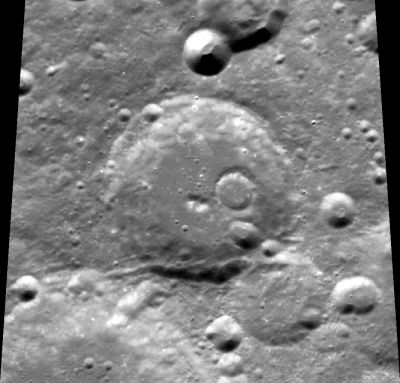
- Clementine mosaic
- Coordinates: 62.60°N 94.63°W
- Diameter: 60.92 km (37.85 mi)
- Depth: Unknown
- Colongitude: 95° at sunrise
- Eponym: Friedrich Paneth

Paneth is a lunar impact crater that is located on the far side of the Moon, just beyond the northwestern limb. It lies just to the north-northeast of the crater Smoluchowski, and to the east-southeast of Boole on the near side. The crater was named in 1970 after German chemist Friedrich Paneth.

The rim of Paneth is worn, but only moderately; the edge remains well-defined and marked only by small craters along the northwest and southeast. This formation partly overlies a shallower crater Paneth K along the southeast of the rim. Only a narrow strip of terrain separates Paneth from Smoluchowski, and this ground is marked by an elongated crater and a short rille.

The interior floor has a central peak formation near the midpoint and a pair of small craters along the eastern rim. The inner surface is otherwise relatively flat and marked only by small craters.

== Satellite craters ==
By convention, these features are identified on lunar maps by placing the letter on the side of the crater midpoint that is closest to Paneth.

Paneth	Latitude	Longitude	Diameter
A	65.3° N	94.1° W	47 km
K	61.7° N	92.9° W	31 km
W	65.0° N	101.2° W	28 km
