= Radium oxide =

Identifiers
CAS Number	12143-02-1
3D model (JSmol)	Interactive image
- InChI: InChI=1S/O.Ra/q-2;+2 Key: PLEZGBHMSVTPPQ-UHFFFAOYSA-N
- SMILES: [Ra+2].[O-2]

Properties
Chemical formula	RaO
Molar mass	242 g/mol
Appearance	solid
Solubility in water	reacts with water

Related compounds
Related compounds	Barium oxide
- Except where otherwise noted, data are given for materials in their standard state (at 25 °C [77 °F], 100 kPa). Infobox references

Radium oxide is an inorganic compound of radium and oxygen with the chemical formula RaO.

== Synthesis ==
The compound can be obtained by heating metallic radium in air:

2Ra + O_{2} → 2RaO

This reaction also produces radium nitride and possibly radium peroxide:

3Ra + N_{2} → Ra_{3}N_{2}
Ra + O_{2} → RaO_{2}

== Chemical properties ==
Radium oxide can react with water to form radium hydroxide:

RaO + H_{2}O → Ra(OH)_{2}

== Uses ==
It is often used as a precursor to create other radium compounds that are used in radiation therapy.
