= Fajans–Paneth–Hahn Law =

Chemistry rule concerning co-precipitation and adsorption

The Fajans–Paneth–Hahn Law (also Fajans precipitation rule, Fajans-Peneth precipitation and adsorption rule, Hahn law of precipitation and adsorption, Fajans Law), in chemistry, is a rule governing how a small amount of one substance (tracer) is carried down to a precipitate of another substance present in much larger amount (carrier) by coprecipitation or adsorption.

The rule states that:

- the lower the solubility of the tracer cation with the anion of the carrier, the greater the amount of the tracer carried down by the carrier through co-precipitates or adsorption;
- when the tracer substance forms a mixed crystal, then the separation by co-precipitation only weakly depends on the conditions;
- the tracer will adsorb on the surface of the carrier precipitate if the precipitate acquired a surface charge opposite to that of the carrier ions in the solution; and then the separation strongly depends on the condition of precipitation.

The amount carried down is strongly affected by presence of complexing species regardless if it occurs by formation of mixed crystals or adsorption.

The law is named after chemists Kazimierz Fajans, Friedrich Paneth and Otto Hahn.

The Fajans-Paneth-Hahn law is essential for understanding the behaviour of minute amounts of substances (e.g., carrier-free radionuclides) in solutions. Note that the tracer is precipitated from the solution even when present at concentration far below its solubility limit. The law is also applied for separation of tracer substances by co-precipitation.

== See also ==
- Hume-Rothery rules
