= Friedrich Paneth =

Austrian-born British chemist (1887–1958)

Friedrich Adolf Paneth FRS
- Born: 31 August 1887; Vienna, Austria-Hungary
- Died: 17 September 1958 (aged 71); Mainz, West Germany
- Education: University of Vienna (PhD 1910)
- Known for: Hydride expertise; Stratosphere studies; Isotope dilution analysis; Lead-mirror experiment; Fajans–Paneth–Hahn Law; Autochrome
- Awards: Lieben Prize (1916); Liversidge Award (1936); Liebig Medal (1957)
- Scientific career
- Fields: Inorganic chemistry
- Workplaces: University of Hamburg; Friedrich Wilhelm University of Berlin; University of Königsberg; Durham University
- Doctoral advisor: Zdenko Hans Skraup

Friedrich Adolf Paneth FRS (31 August 1887 – 17 September 1958) was an Austrian-born British chemist. Fleeing the Nazis, he escaped to Britain. He became a naturalized British citizen in 1939. After the war, Paneth returned to Germany to become director of the Max Planck Institute for Chemistry in 1953. He was considered the greatest authority of his time on volatile hydrides; he also made important contributions to the study of the stratosphere. He was an enthusiastic amateur photographer (using the autochrome method) all his life.

Paneth's conception of ″chemical element″ functions as the official definition adopted by the IUPAC.

== Biography ==
Friedrich (Fritz) Paneth was born as son of the physiologist Joseph Paneth. He and his three brothers were brought up in Protestant faith, although both parents were of Jewish descent. He was educated at the Schottengymnasium a renowned school in Vienna. He studied chemistry at the University of Vienna and after working with Adolf von Baeyer at the Ludwig-Maximilians-Universität München he received his PhD with Zdenko Hans Skraup at the organic chemistry department of the University of Vienna in 1910.

He abandoned organic chemistry and in 1912 joined the Institute for Radium Research, Vienna radiochemistry group of Stefan Meyer. In 1913, he visited Frederick Soddy at the University of Glasgow and Ernest Rutherford at the University of Manchester. In this year he married Else Hartmann; they had a son and daughter. After his habilitation in 1913, he became assistant of Otto Hönigschmid at Charles University in Prague. From 1919 until 1933, he was professor in various German universities:(University of Hamburg 1919, Friedrich Wilhelm University of Berlin 1922, University of Königsberg 1929.

In 1927, Paneth and Kurt Peters published his results on the transformation of hydrogen to helium, now known as cold fusion. They later retracted the results, saying they had measured background helium from the air.

During Hitler's Machtergreifung in 1933 he was on a lecture tour in England and did not return to Germany. In 1939, he became professor at Durham University where he stayed until his retirement in 1953.

A call to become director at the Max Planck Institute for Chemistry in Mainz caused him to return to Germany. He founded the Department of Cosmochemistry there and initiated research on meteorites. He worked in the Institute until his death in 1958.

== Career summary ==
- Assistant in Institute for Radium Research attached to Austrian Academy of Sciences, Vienna, 1912
- Assistant professor, University of Hamburg, 1919
- Head of inorganic department of chemical institute, Friedrich Wilhelm University of Berlin, 1922
- Head of chemical institute, University of Königsberg, 1929
- Reader in atomic chemistry, Imperial College London, 1938; among his assistants was Eugen Glueckauf
- Professor of chemistry, Durham University, 1939
- Head of chemistry division of joint British-Canadian atomic energy team in Montreal, 1943-5
- Returned to Durham and established Londonderry Laboratory for radio-chemistry, heading it until retirement, 1953

== Honours and awards ==
Paneth received the Lieben Prize (1916), the Liversidge Award (1936), and the Liebig Medal (1957). He was elected a Fellow of the Royal Society in 1947.

The mineral panethite is named after him, as is the lunar crater Paneth.

== See also ==
- Fajans–Paneth–Hahn Law
