= Joseph Paneth =

Austrian physiologist (1857–1890)

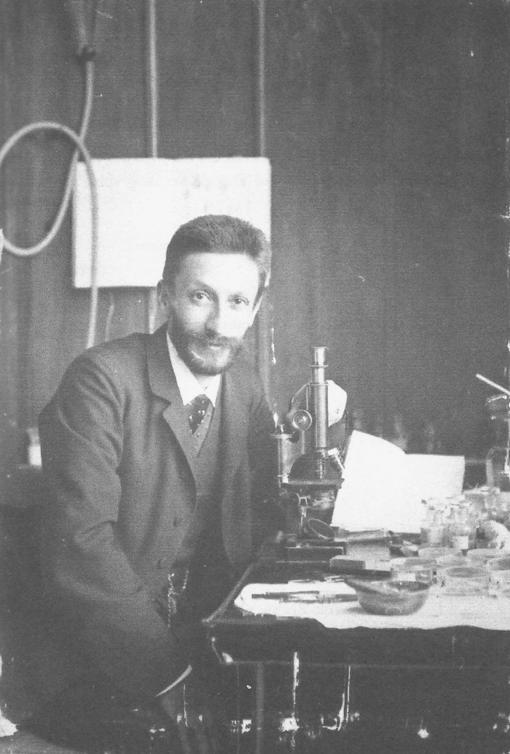
Joseph Paneth, ca. 1885

Joseph Paneth (6 October 1857 – 4 January 1890) was a physiologist born in Vienna. Paneth is remembered for his description of "Paneth cells", which are cells that provide host defense against microbes in the mucosa of the small intestine.

He studied at the Universities of Heidelberg and Vienna, where he worked with physiologist Ernst Wilhelm von Brücke (1819–1892). After a short stay at the University of Breslau, he returned to Vienna, where in 1886 he became a lecturer at the university. In 1883 and 1884 he worked at the zoological station at Villefranche, near Nice.

He was a good friend of psychologist Sigmund Freud, who made a posthumous reference of Paneth in The Interpretation of Dreams. Paneth is also remembered for his correspondence with philosopher Friedrich Nietzsche.

In January of 1890, Paneth died of Tuberculosis. He was the father of chemist Friedrich Paneth (1887–1958).
