= Barium iodate =

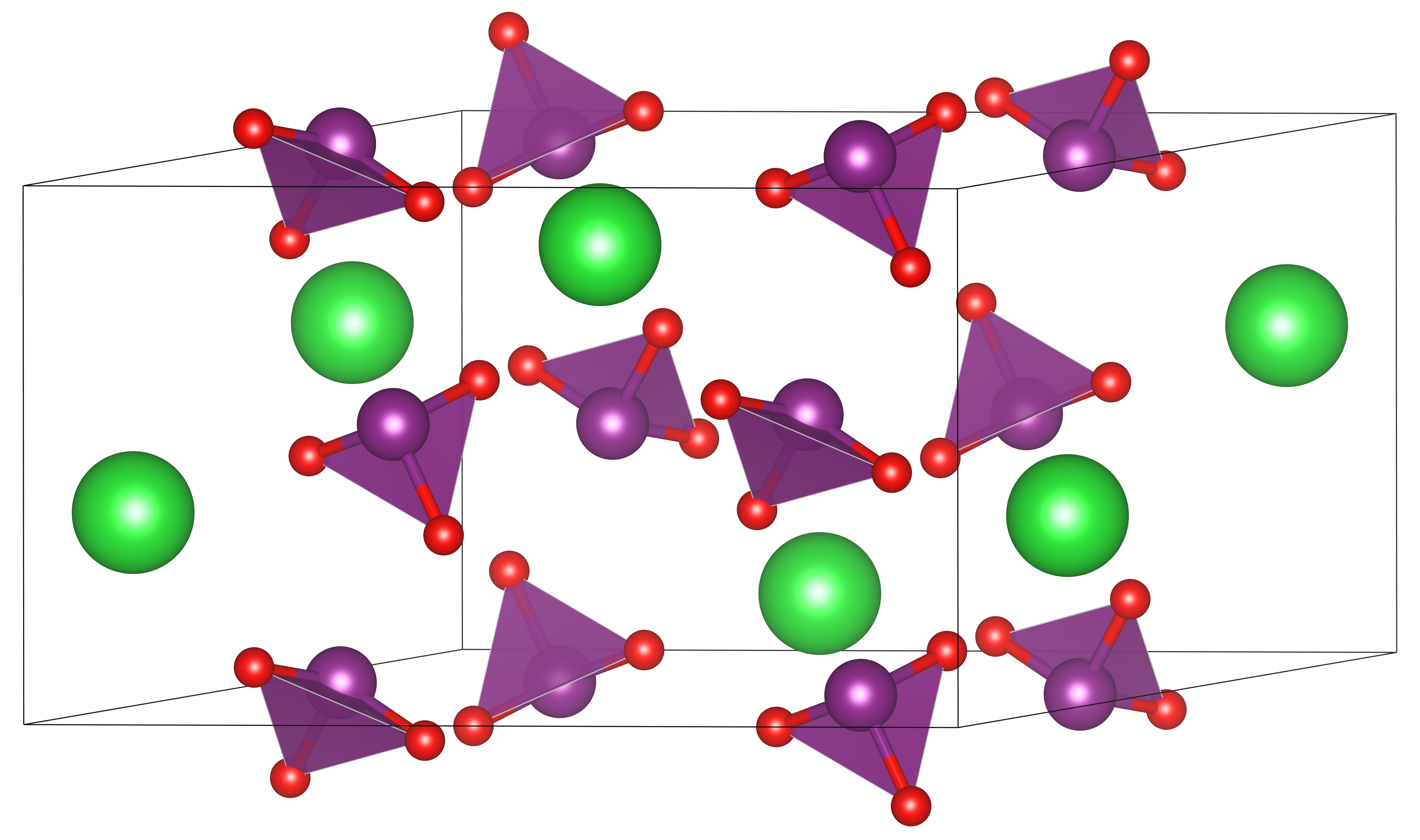
- Unit cell

Identifiers
CAS Number	10567-69-8
3D model (JSmol)	Interactive image
ChemSpider	145385
ECHA InfoCard	100.031.035
PubChem CID	165892
UNII	ST2993NJ5J
CompTox Dashboard (EPA)	DTXSID70909677
- InChI: InChI=1S/Ba.2HIO3/c;2*2-1(3)4/h;2*(H,2,3,4)/q+2;;/p-2 Key: GASILTKHXWGKMG-UHFFFAOYSA-L; InChI=1/Ba.2HIO3/c;2*2-1(3)4/h;2*(H,2,3,4)/q+2;;/p-2 Key: GASILTKHXWGKMG-NUQVWONBAR
- SMILES: [Ba+2].[O-]I(=O)=O.[O-]I(=O)=O

Properties
Chemical formula	Ba(IO_{3})_{2}
Molar mass	487.13 g/mol
Melting point	580 °C (1,076 °F; 853 K)(decomposes)
Solubility product (K_{sp})	1.57 × 10^{−9}
Magnetic susceptibility (χ)	−122.5·10^{−6} cm^{3}/mol
- Except where otherwise noted, data are given for materials in their standard state (at 25 °C [77 °F], 100 kPa). Infobox references

Barium iodate is an inorganic chemical compound with the chemical formula Ba(IO_{3})_{2}. It is a white, granular substance.

== Derivation ==
Barium iodate can be derived either as a product of a reaction of iodine and barium hydroxide or by combining barium chlorate with potassium iodate.

Ba(ClO_{3})_{2} + 2KIO_{3} → Ba(IO_{3})_{2} + 2KClO_{3}

== Chemical properties ==
The compound is stable at a temperature up to approximately 580 °C (1,076 °F). If the temperature is higher than that value, the following reaction, known as Rammelsberg's reaction, occurs:

5 Ba(IO_{3})_{2} → Ba_{5}(IO_{6})_{2} + 9 O_{2} + 4 I_{2}
