= Smoluchowski (crater) =

Crater on the Moon

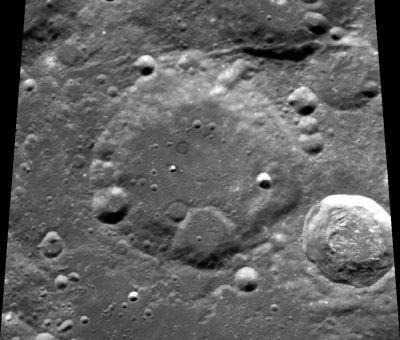
- Clementine mosaic. Smoluchowski H is in lower right.
- Coordinates: 60.22°N 96.91°W
- Diameter: 84.26 km (52.36 mi)
- Depth: Unknown
- Colongitude: 98° at sunrise
- Eponym: Marian Smoluchowski

Smoluchowski is a lunar impact crater on the far side of the Moon. It lies in the part of the lunar surface that is sometimes brought into view of the Earth during periods of favorable libration and illumination from sunlight, but at such times little detail can be seen as the crater is observed from the edge. The crater was named in 1970 after Polish physicist Marian Smoluchowski.

Smoluchowski lies across the northern rim of the larger Poczobutt, a walled plain. Nearly attached to the north-northeastern outer rim of Smoluchowski is the smaller crater Paneth.

This is a worn and eroded crater formation that has still managed to retain much of its original shape. The remains of a small crater lie across the southern floor and inner wall of Smoluchowski, protruding outwards slightly into Poczobutt. A smaller crater lies along the inner wall of the southwestern rim. Along the surface connecting Smoluchowski with Paneth is an elongated depression in the surface that overlies the rim edge and inner wall of Smoluchowski. There is also a narrow groove in the surface near that site running from east to west.

Apart from the small crater rim in the southern floor, the interior surface of Smoluchowski is relatively level and featureless. A few small craters mark the floor, the most notable being along the eastern edge.

== Satellite craters ==
By convention these features are identified on lunar maps by placing the letter on the side of the crater midpoint that is closest to Smoluchowski.

Smoluchowski	Latitude	Longitude	Diameter
F	60.1° N	90.9° W	35 km
H	59.5° N	92.7° W	41 km

Smoluchowski H, to the southeast of Smoluchowski, is a relatively fresh crater, possibly of Eratosthenian age.

== Bibliography ==
- Andersson, L. E.; Whitaker, E. A. (1982). NASA Catalogue of Lunar Nomenclature. NASA RP-1097.
- Blue, Jennifer (July 25, 2007). "Gazetteer of Planetary Nomenclature". USGS.
- Bussey, B.; Spudis, P. (2004). The Clementine Atlas of the Moon. New York: Cambridge University Press. ISBN 978-0-521-81528-4.
- Cocks, Elijah E.; Cocks, Josiah C. (1995). Who's Who on the Moon: A Biographical Dictionary of Lunar Nomenclature. Tudor Publishers. ISBN 978-0-936389-27-1.
- McDowell, Jonathan (July 15, 2007). "Lunar Nomenclature". Jonathan's Space Report. Archived from the original on 2012-02-08.
- Menzel, D. H.; Minnaert, M.; Levin, B.; Dollfus, A.; Bell, B. (1971). "Report on Lunar Nomenclature by the Working Group of Commission 17 of the IAU". Space Science Reviews. 12 (2): 136–186. Bibcode:1971SSRv...12..136M. doi:10.1007/BF00171763. S2CID 122125855.
- Moore, Patrick (2001). On the Moon. Sterling Publishing Co. ISBN 978-0-304-35469-6.
- Price, Fred W. (1988). The Moon Observer's Handbook. Cambridge University Press. ISBN 978-0-521-33500-3.
- Rükl, Antonín (1990). Atlas of the Moon. Kalmbach Books. ISBN 978-0-913135-17-4.
- Webb, Rev. T. W. (1962). Celestial Objects for Common Telescopes (6th revised ed.). Dover. ISBN 978-0-486-20917-3.
- Whitaker, Ewen A. (1999). Mapping and Naming the Moon. Cambridge University Press. ISBN 978-0-521-62248-6.
- Wlasuk, Peter T. (2000). Observing the Moon. Springer. ISBN 978-1-85233-193-1.
