= Radium carbonate =

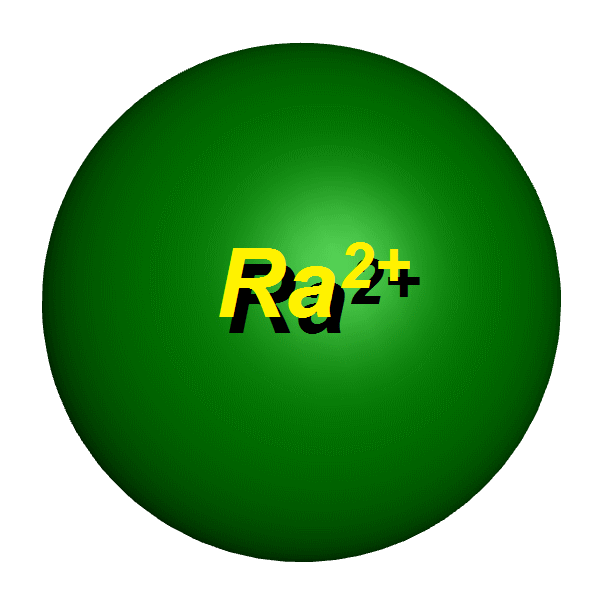

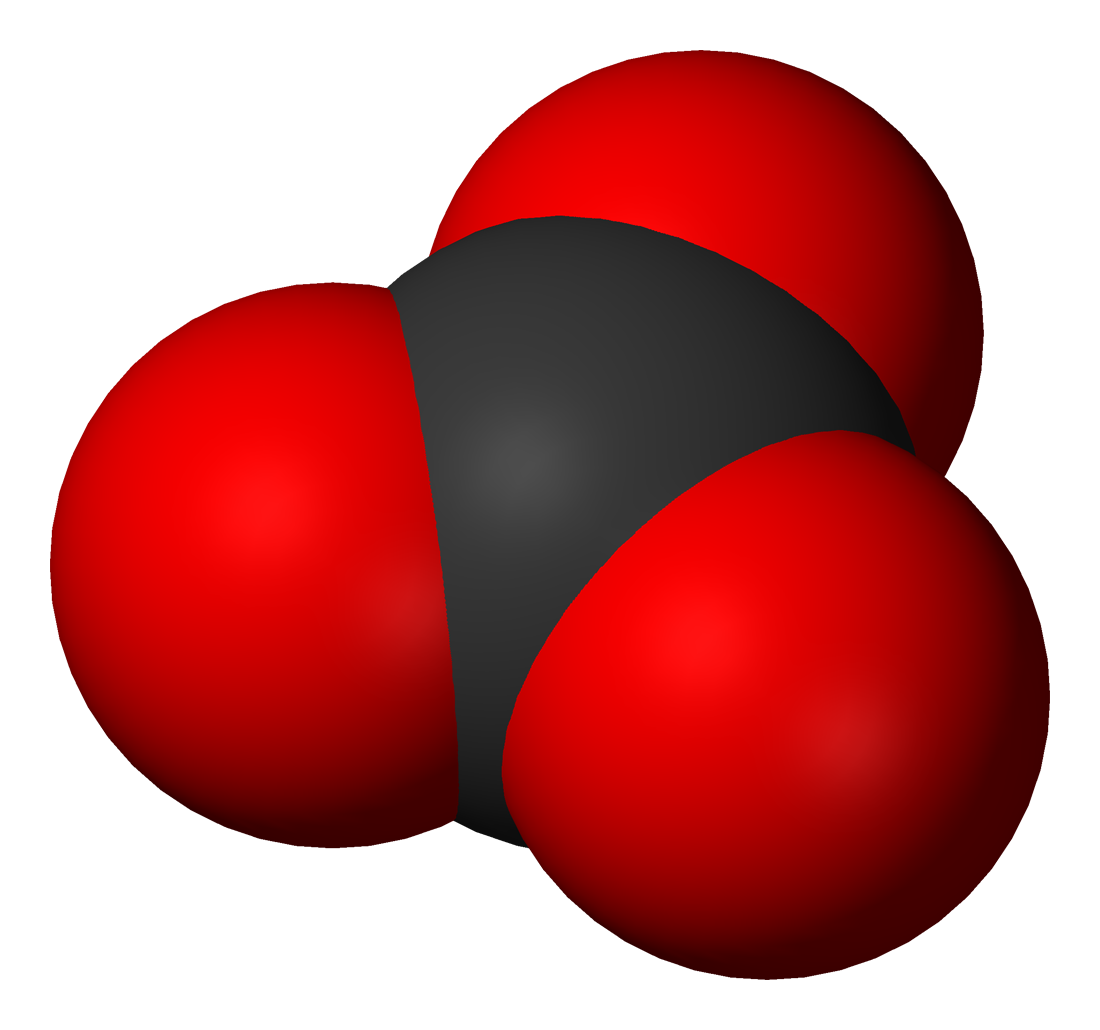

Names
- IUPAC name Radium carbonate

Identifiers
CAS Number	7116-98-5
3D model (JSmol)	Interactive image
- InChI: InChI=1S/CH2O3.Ra/c2-1(3)4;/h(H2,2,3,4);/q;+2/p-2 Key: YPWICUOZSQYGTD-UHFFFAOYSA-L
- SMILES: [Ra+2].[O-]C([O-])=O

Properties
Chemical formula	RaCO_{3}
Molar mass	286.0089 g/mol
Appearance	white powder
Solubility in water	0.05 g/L (25 °C)
Solubility product (K_{sp})	10^{−7.5±0.1} (25 °C)

Hazards
- Occupational safety and health (OHS/OSH)
Main hazards	radioactive

Related compounds
Other cations	Beryllium carbonate; Magnesium carbonate; Calcium carbonate; Strontium carbonate; Barium carbonate; Lead(II) carbonate; Zinc carbonate; Cadmium carbonate
- Except where otherwise noted, data are given for materials in their standard state (at 25 °C [77 °F], 100 kPa). Infobox references

Radium carbonate is a chemical compound of radium, carbon, and oxygen, having the chemical formula RaCO_{3}. It is the radium salt of carbonic acid. It contains radium cations (Ra^{2+}) and carbonate anions (CO^{2−}_{3}). This salt is a highly radioactive, amorphous, white powder that has potential applications in medicine. It is notable for forming disordered crystals at room temperature and for being approximately 10 times more soluble than its lighter congener barium carbonate. Radium carbonate is one of a few radium compounds which has significantly different properties from corresponding barium compounds. Moreover, radium is the only alkaline-earth metal which forms disordered crystals in its carbonate phase. Even though radium carbonate has very low solubility in water, it is soluble in dilute mineral acids and concentrated ammonium carbonate.

== Preparation ==
Radium carbonate can be produced by dissolving radium sulfate at elevated temperatures in concentrated sodium carbonate and subsequent removal of supernatant:

RaSO_{4}(s) → Ra^{2+} + SO^{2−}_{4}
Ra^{2+} + CO^{2−}_{3} → RaCO_{3}(s)

Because of the very low solubility of RaCO_{3}, it will form a white precipitate.

== Reactions ==
Radium carbonate can be used to produce radium nitrate and other radium salts:

RaCO_{3} + 2 HNO_{3} → Ra(NO_{3})_{2} + H_{2}O + CO_{2}
