= Radium sulfate =

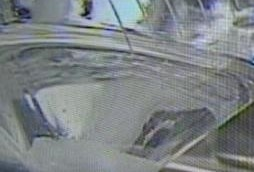

Identifiers
CAS Number	7446-16-4
3D model (JSmol)	Interactive image
ChemSpider	10745681
PubChem CID	6365199
- InChI: InChI=1S/H2O4S.Ra/c1-5(2,3)4;/h(H2,1,2,3,4);/p-2 Key: XOROGAYSRYIXBN-UHFFFAOYSA-L
- SMILES: [O-]S(=O)(=O)[O-].[Ra]

Properties
Chemical formula	O_{4}RaS
Molar mass	322 g·mol^{−1}
Appearance	White solid
Solubility product (K_{sp})	3.66×10^{−11}

Related compounds
Other cations	strontium sulfate, barium sulfate, lead(II) sulfate
- Except where otherwise noted, data are given for materials in their standard state (at 25 °C [77 °F], 100 kPa). Infobox references

Radium sulfate (or radium sulphate) is an inorganic compound with the formula RaSO_{4} and an average molecular mass of 322.088 g/mol (for ^{226}Ra). This white salt is the least soluble of all known alkaline-earth sulfate salts and the least soluble of all radium salts. It was formerly used in radiotherapy and smoke detectors, but this has been phased out in favor of less hazardous alternatives.

== Properties ==
Radium sulfate crystallizes in a solid in the same structure as barium sulfate. It forms crystals in the orthorhombic crystal system, with a unit cell of dimensions a = 0.9129(8) nm, b= 0.5538(3) nm and c = 0.7313(5) nm. The unit cell volume is 369.7(5) Å^{3}. Distance from the radium ion to oxygen is 2.96 Å and the sulfur to oxygen bond length in the sulfate ion is 1.485 Å. In this compound the ionic radius of the radium ion is 1.66 Å, and it is in ten coordination.

Radium sulfate can form solid solutions with the sulfates of strontium, barium or lead.
