= Coprecipitation =

Chemical process

In chemistry, coprecipitation (CPT) or co-precipitation is the carrying down by a precipitate of substances normally soluble under the conditions employed. Analogously, in medicine, coprecipitation (referred to as immunoprecipitation) is specifically "an assay designed to purify a single antigen from a complex mixture using a specific antibody attached to a beaded support".

Coprecipitation is an important topic in chemical analysis, where it can be undesirable, but can also be usefully exploited. In gravimetric analysis, which consists on precipitating the analyte and measuring its mass to determine its concentration or purity, coprecipitation is a problem because undesired impurities often coprecipitate with the analyte, resulting in excess mass. This problem can often be mitigated by "digestion" (waiting for the precipitate to equilibrate and form larger and purer particles) or by redissolving the sample and precipitating it again.

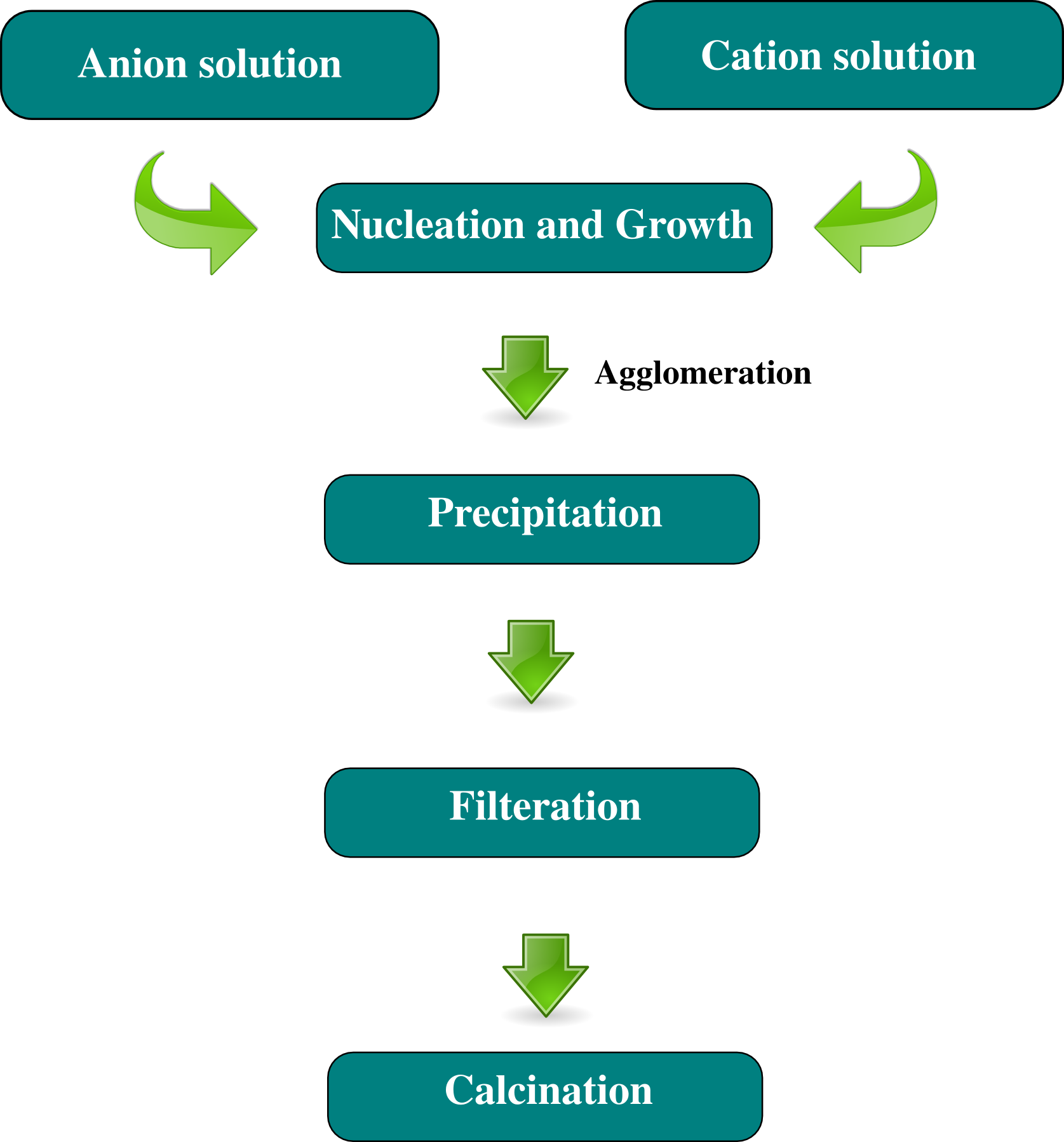
Typical co-precipitation method for micro and nano particle synthesis

On the other hand, in the analysis of trace elements, as is often the case in radiochemistry, coprecipitation is often the only way of separating an element. Since the trace element is too dilute (sometimes less than a part per trillion) to precipitate by conventional means, it is typically coprecipitated with a carrier, a substance that has a similar crystalline structure that can incorporate the desired element. An example is the separation of francium from other radioactive elements by coprecipitating it with caesium salts such as caesium perchlorate. Otto Hahn is credited for promoting the use of coprecipitation in radiochemistry.

There are three main mechanisms of coprecipitation: inclusion, occlusion, and adsorption. An inclusion (incorporation in the crystal lattice) occurs when the impurity occupies a lattice site in the crystal structure of the carrier, resulting in a crystallographic defect; this can happen when the ionic radius and charge of the impurity are similar to those of the carrier. An occlusion occurs when an adsorbed impurity gets physically trapped inside the crystal as it grows. An adsorbate is an impurity that is weakly, or strongly, bound (adsorbed) to the surface of the precipitate.

Besides its applications in chemical analysis and in radiochemistry, coprecipitation is also important to many environmental issues related to water resources, including acid mine drainage, radionuclide migration around waste repositories, toxic heavy metal transport at industrial and defense sites, metal concentrations in aquatic systems, and wastewater treatment technology.

Coprecipitation is also used as a method of magnetic nanoparticle synthesis.

== Distribution between precipitate and solution ==
There are two models describing of the distribution of the tracer compound between the two phases (the precipitate and the solution):

- Doerner-Hoskins law (logarithmic):

$$\ln\frac a{a-x} = \lambda \ln\frac b{b-y}$$

- Berthelot-Nernst law:

$$\frac x{a-x} = D \frac y{b-y}$$

where:

a and b are the initial concentrations of the tracer and carrier, respectively;
a − x and b − y are the concentrations of tracer and carrier after separation;
x and y are the amounts of the tracer and carrier on the precipitate;
D and λ are the distribution coefficients.

For D and λ greater than 1, the precipitate is enriched in the tracer.

Depending on the co-precipitation system and conditions either λ or D may be constant.

The derivation of the Doerner-Hoskins law assumes that there in no mass exchange between the interior of the precipitating crystals and the solution. When this assumption is fulfilled, then the content of the tracer in the crystal is non-uniform (the crystals are said to be heterogeneous). When the Berthelot-Nernst law applies, then the concentration of the tracer in the interior of the crystal is uniform (and the crystals are said to be homogeneous). This is the case when diffusion in the interior is possible (like in the liquids) or when the initial small crystals are allowed to recrystallize. Kinetic effects (like speed of crystallization and presence of mixing) play a role.

== See also ==
- Fajans–Paneth–Hahn Law
