= List of UN numbers 1501 to 1600 =

UN numbers from UN1501 to UN1600 as assigned by the United Nations Committee of Experts on the Transport of Dangerous Goods are as follows:

== UN 1501 to UN 1600 ==
UN Number	Class	Proper Shipping Name
UN 1501	?	(UN No. no longer in use)
UN 1502	5.1	Sodium perchlorate
UN 1503	5.1	Sodium permanganate
UN 1504	5.1	Sodium peroxide
UN 1505	5.1	Sodium persulfate
UN 1506	5.1	Strontium chlorate
UN 1507	5.1	Strontium nitrate
UN 1508	5.1	Strontium perchlorate
UN 1509	5.1	Strontium peroxide
UN 1510	5.1	Tetranitromethane
UN 1511	5.1	Urea hydrogen peroxide
UN 1512	5.1	Zinc ammonium nitrite
UN 1513	5.1	Zinc chlorate
UN 1514	5.1	Zinc nitrate
UN 1515	5.1	Zinc permanganate
UN 1516	5.1	Zinc peroxide
UN 1517	4.1	Zirconium picramate, wetted with not less than 20 percent water, by mass
UN 1518 to 1540	?	(UN No.s no longer in use)
UN 1541	6.1	Acetone cyanohydrin, stabilized
UN 1542 to 1543	?	(UN No.s no longer in use)
UN 1544	6.1	Alkaloids, solid, n.o.s. or Alkaloid salts, solid, n.o.s., toxic
UN 1545	6.1	Allyl isothiocyanate, stabilized
UN 1546	6.1	Ammonium arsenate
UN 1547	6.1	Aniline
UN 1548	6.1	Aniline hydrochloride
UN 1549	6.1	Antimony compounds, inorganic, solid, n.o.s.
UN 1550	6.1	Antimony lactate
UN 1551	6.1	Antimony potassium tartrate
UN 1552	?	(UN No. no longer in use)
UN 1553	6.1	Arsenic acid, liquid
UN 1554	6.1	Arsenic acid, solid
UN 1555	6.1	Arsenic bromide
UN 1556	6.1	Arsenic compounds, liquid, n.o.s. inorganic, including arsenates, n.o.s.; arsenites, n.o.s.; arsenic sulfides, n.o.s.; and organic compounds of arsenic, n.o.s.
UN 1557	6.1	Arsenic compounds, solid, n.o.s. inorganic, including arsenates, n.o.s.; arsenites, n.o.s.; arsenic sulfides, n.o.s.; and organic compounds of arsenic, n.o.s.
UN 1558	6.1	Arsenic
UN 1559	6.1	Arsenic pentoxide
UN 1560	6.1	Arsenic trichloride
UN 1561	6.1	Arsenic trioxide
UN 1562	6.1	Arsenical dust
UN 1563	?	(UN No. no longer in use)
UN 1564	6.1	Barium compounds, n.o.s.
UN 1565	6.1	Barium cyanide
UN 1566	6.1	Beryllium compounds, n.o.s.
UN 1567	6.1	Beryllium, powder
UN 1568	?	(UN No. no longer in use)
UN 1569	6.1	Bromoacetone
UN 1570	6.1	Brucine
UN 1571	4.1	Barium azide, wetted with not less than 50 percent water, by mass
UN 1572	6.1	Cacodylic acid
UN 1573	6.1	Calcium arsenate
UN 1574	6.1	Calcium arsenate and calcium arsenite, mixtures, solid
UN 1575	6.1	Calcium cyanide
UN 1576	?	(UN No. no longer in use)
UN 1577	6.1	Chlorodinitrobenzenes
UN 1578	6.1	Chloronitrobenzene, ortho, liquid or Chloronitrobenzenes meta or para, solid
UN 1579	6.1	4-Chloro-o-toluidine hydrochloride
UN 1580	6.1	Chloropicrin
UN 1581	2	Chloropicrin and methyl bromide mixtures
UN 1582	2	Chloropicrin and methyl chloride mixtures
UN 1583	6.1	Chloropicrin mixtures, n.o.s.
UN 1584	?	(UN No. no longer in use) Cocculus (Indian berry) (UN No. no longer in use)
UN 1585	6.1	Copper acetoarsenite
UN 1586	6.1	Copper arsenite
UN 1587	6.1	Copper cyanide
UN 1588	6.1	Cyanides, inorganic, solid, n.o.s.
UN 1589	2	Cyanogen chloride, inhibited
UN 1590	6.1	Dichloroanilines, liquid or Dichloroanilines, solid
UN 1591	6.1	o-Dichlorobenzene
UN 1592	?	(UN No. no longer in use) p-Dichlorobenzene (UN No. no longer in use)
UN 1593	6.1	Dichloromethane
UN 1594	6.1	Diethyl sulfate
UN 1595	6.1	Dimethyl sulfate
UN 1596	6.1	Dinitroanilines
UN 1597	6.1	Dinitrobenzenes, liquid or Dinitrobenzenes, solid
UN 1598	6.1	Dinitro-o-cresol, solid or Dinitro-o-cresol, solution
UN 1599	6.1	Dinitrophenol solutions
UN 1600	6.1	Dinitrotoluenes, molten

n.o.s. = not otherwise specified meaning a collective entry to which substances, mixtures, solutions or articles may be assigned if a) they are not mentioned by name in 3.2 Dangerous Goods List AND b) they exhibit chemical, physical and/or dangerous properties corresponding to the Class, classification code, packing group and the name and description of the n.o.s. entry

== See also ==
- Lists of UN numbers
