= Strontium chlorate =

Identifiers
CAS Number	7791-10-8
3D model (JSmol)	Interactive image
ChemSpider	23043
ECHA InfoCard	100.029.309
EC Number	232-239-3
PubChem CID	24641
UNII	XG48A4P4FB
CompTox Dashboard (EPA)	DTXSID70890637
- InChI: InChI=1S/2ClHO3.Sr/c2*2-1(3)4;/h2*(H,2,3,4);/q;;+2/p-2 Key: FRTABACCYANHFP-UHFFFAOYSA-L
- SMILES: [O-]Cl(=O)=O.[O-]Cl(=O)=O.[Sr+2]

Properties
Chemical formula	Sr(ClO_{3})_{2}
Molar mass	254.51 g·mol^{−1}
Appearance	colorless or white crystals
Density	3.15 g/cm^{3}
Melting point	120 °C (248 °F; 393 K) (hydrates, decompose to anhydrous); 290 °C (554 °F; 563 K) (anhydrous, decomposes)
Solubility in water	174.9 g/100 mL (18 °C (64 °F; 291 K))
Solubility in ethanol	soluble (in dilute), insoluble (in absolute)
Magnetic susceptibility (χ)	73.0×10^{−6} cm^{3}/mol
Refractive index (n_{D})	1.516, 1.605, & 1.626

Structure
Crystal structure	rhombic

Hazards
- GHS labelling
Pictograms	(GHS03: Oxidizing) (GHS07: Exclamation mark) (GHS09: Environmental hazard)
Signal word	Danger
Hazard statements	H271, H302, H312, H315, H320, H332, H335, H411
Precautionary statements	P210, P220, P221, P261, P273, P280, P301+P312, P302+P352, P304+P340, P305+P351+P338, P332+P313
NFPA 704 (fire diamond)	2 0 2 OX

Related compounds
Other anions	Strontium chromate; Strontium nitrate; Strontium perchlorate; Strontium peroxide
Other cations	Potassium chlorate; Magnesium chlorate; Barium chlorate
- Except where otherwise noted, data are given for materials in their standard state (at 25 °C [77 °F], 100 kPa). Infobox references

Strontium chlorate is a chemical compound with the formula Sr(ClO_{3})_{2}. It is a strong oxidizing agent. It exists in several hydrated forms; the monohydrate (Sr(ClO_{3})_{2}·H_{2}O), the trihydrate (Sr(ClO_{3})_{2}·3H_{2}O), and the octahydrate (Sr(ClO_{3})_{2}·8H_{2}O)

It has been used as an oxidizing agent in explosive mixtures, where it has a cooling effect because of the large amount of water of crystallization. It has also been used in a published Italian pyrotechnic violet star formula.

== Preparation ==
Strontium chlorate may be prepared by neutralizing an aqueous chloric acid (HClO_{3}) solution with Sr(OH)_{2} or strontium carbonate (SrCO_{3}) and then warming this solution over concentrated sulfuric acid (H_{2}SO_{4}). The anhydrous salt may be prepared by heating any of the hydrates to 120 °C (248 °F).

It may also be prepared by warming a solution of strontium hydroxide and bubbling chlorine through it, with subsequent crystallization. Chlorine has no action on dry Sr(OH)_{2}, but it converts the hydrate (Sr(OH)_{2}·8H_{2}O) into strontium chloride (SrCl_{2}) and chlorate, with a small quantity of strontium hypochlorite also being produced.
