= Pyrotechnic colorant =

Chemical compound that produces coloured flames

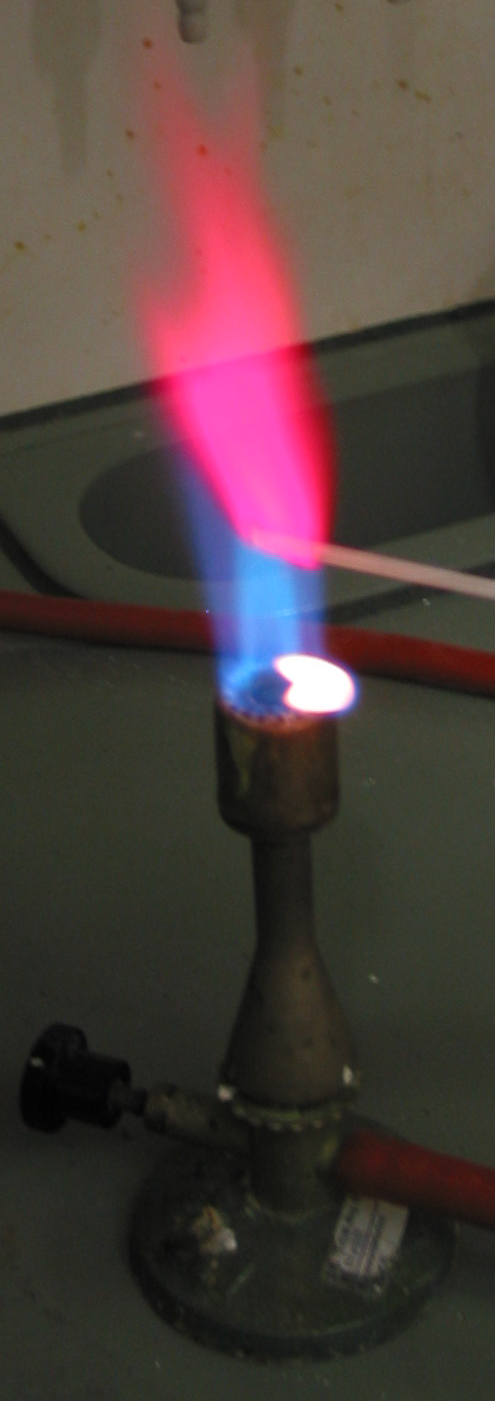
The red lithium flame leads to lithium's use in flares and pyrotechnics

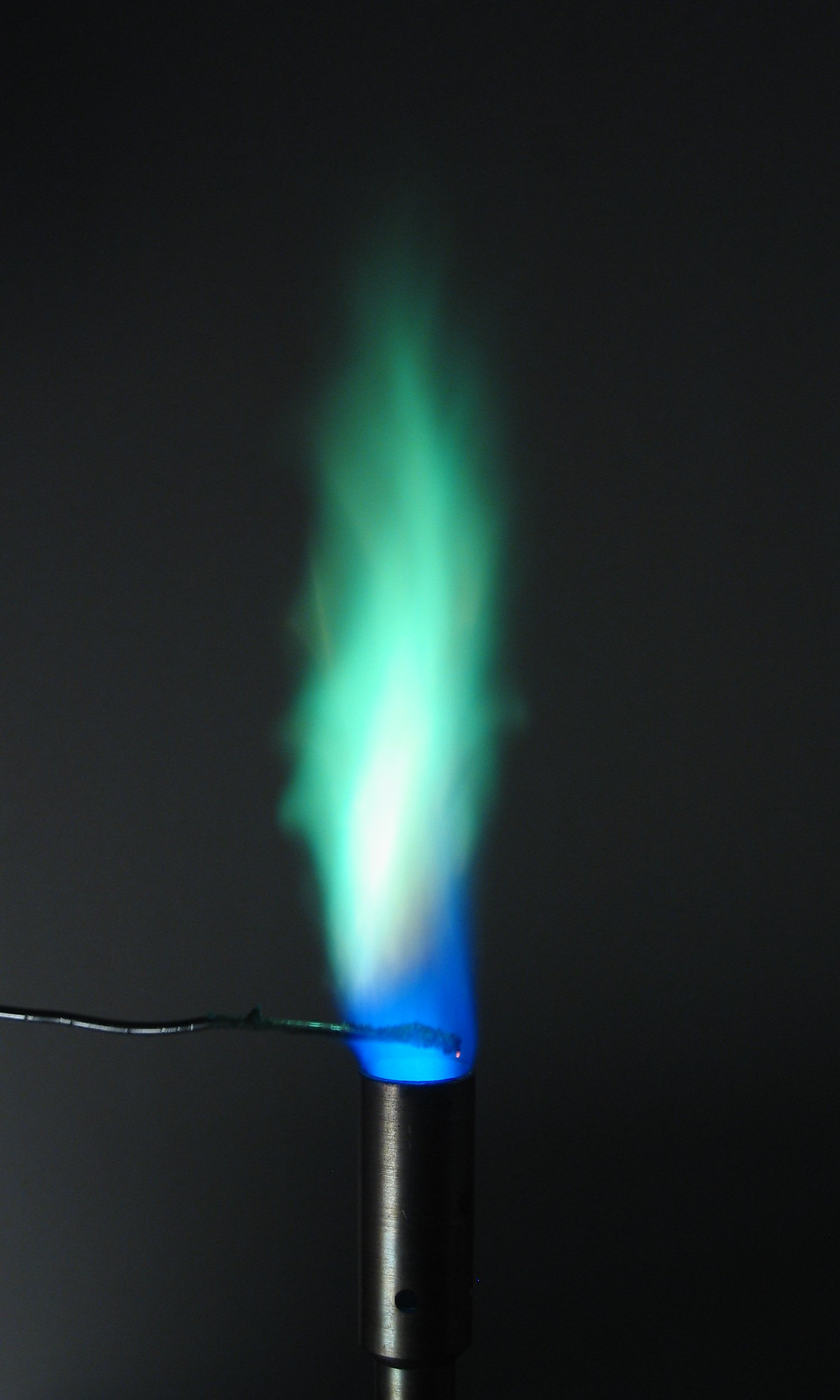
Copper compounds glow green or blue-green in a flame.

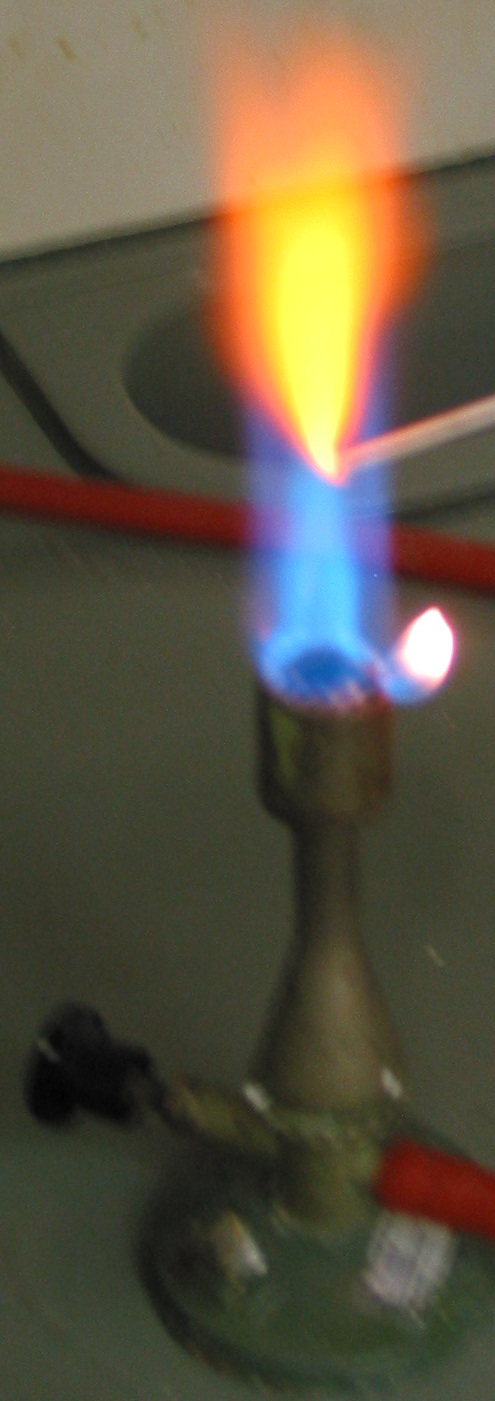
Calcium compounds glow orange in a flame.

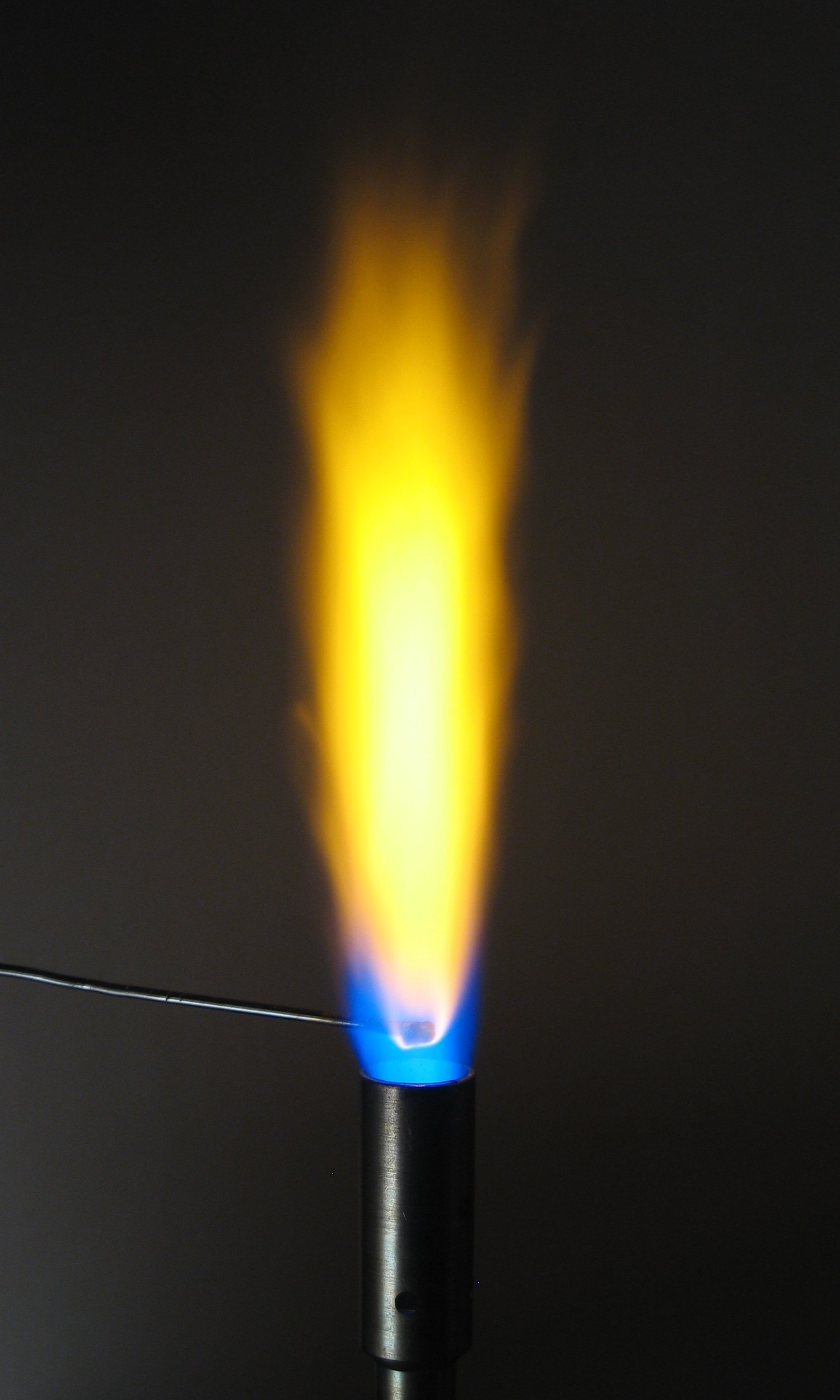
Sodium compounds glow yellow in a flame.

A pyrotechnic colorant is a chemical compound which causes a flame to burn with a particular colour. These are used to create the colours in pyrotechnic compositions like fireworks and coloured fires. The colour-producing species are usually created from other chemicals during the reaction. Metal salts are commonly used; elemental metals are used rarely (e.g. copper for blue flames).

The colour of the flame is dependent on the metal cation; the anion of the salt has very little direct influence. The anions however influence the flame temperature, both by increasing it (e.g. nitrates, chlorates) and decreasing it (e.g. carbonates, oxalates), indirectly influencing the flame brightness and brilliancy. For temperature-decreasing additives, the limit of colorant may be about 10–20 wt.% of the composition.

Some common examples are:

Colour	Compound name	Chemical formula	Notes
Red	Strontium nitrate	Sr(NO_{3})_{2}	Common. Used with chlorine donors. Excellent red, especially with metal fuels. Used in many compositions including road flares.
Red	Strontium carbonate	SrCO_{3}	Common. Produces good red. Slows burning of compositions, decomposes yielding carbon dioxide. Fire retardant in gunpowders. Inexpensive, non-hygroscopic, neutralizes acids. Superior over strontium oxalate in absence of magnesium.
Red	Strontium oxalate	SrC_{2}O_{4}	Decomposes yielding carbon dioxide and carbon monoxide. In presence of magnesium fuel, carbon monoxide reduces particles of magnesium oxide, yielding gaseous magnesium and eliminating the black-body radiation of the MgO particles, resulting in clearer colour.
Red	Strontium sulfate	SrSO_{4}	Common. High-temperature oxidizer. Used in strobe mixtures and some metal-based red compositions.
Red	Strontium chloride	SrCl_{2}	Common. Produces bright red flame.
Orange	Calcium carbonate	CaCO_{3}	Produces orange flame. Yields carbon dioxide on decomposition. Often used in toy fireworks as a substitute for strontium.
Orange	Calcium chloride	CaCl_{2}	
Orange	Calcium sulfate	CaSO_{4}	High-temperature oxidizer. Excellent orange source in strobe compositions.
Orange	Hydrated calcium sulfate	CaSO_{4}(H_{2}O)_{x*}	The * indicates that the compound will burn orange where x=0,2,3,5.
Gold/Yellow	Charcoal powder		
Yellow	Sodium bicarbonate	NaHCO_{3}	Compatible with potassium chlorate. Less burning rate decrease than sodium carbonate. Incompatible with magnesium and aluminium, reacts evolving hydrogen gas.
Yellow	Sodium carbonate	Na_{2}CO_{3}	Hygroscopic. Significantly decreases burning rate, decomposes evolving carbon dioxide. Strongly alkaline. Very effective colorant, can be used in small amounts. Corrodes magnesium and aluminium, incompatible with them.
Yellow	Sodium chloride	NaCl	Loses hygroscopicity on heating. Corrodes metals.
Yellow	Sodium oxalate	Na_{2}C_{2}O_{4}	Non-hygroscopic. Slightly reacts with magnesium, no reaction with aluminium.
Yellow	Sodium nitrate	NaNO_{3}	Also acts as oxidizer. Bright flame, used for illumination.
Yellow	Cryolite	Na_{3}AlF_{6}	One of the few sodium salts that is nonhygroscopic and insoluble in water.
Green	Barium chloride	BaCl_{2}	
Green	Barium chlorate	Ba(ClO_{3})_{2}	Classic exhibition green with shellac fuel. Sensitive to shock and friction. Oxidizer.
Green	Barium carbonate	BaCO_{3}	A pretty colour when ammonium perchlorate is used as oxidizer.
Green	Barium nitrate	Ba(NO_{3})_{2}	Not too strong effect. With chlorine donors yields green colour, without chlorine burns white. In green compositions usually used with perchlorates.
Green	Barium oxalate	BaC_{2}O_{4}	
Blue	Copper(I) chloride	CuCl	The richest blue flame. Almost insoluble in water.
Blue	Copper(I) oxide	Cu_{2}O	Lowest cost blue colorant.
Blue	Copper(II) oxide	CuO	Used with chlorine donors. Excellent in composite stars.
Blue	Basic copper carbonate	CuCO_{3}·Cu(OH)_{2}, 2 CuCO_{3}·Cu(OH)_{2}	Occurs naturally as malachite and azurite. Good with ammonium perchlorate and for high-temperature flames with presence of hydrogen chloride. Not easily airborne, less poisonous than Paris Green.
Blue	Copper oxychloride	3CuO·CuCl_{2}	Good blue colorant with suitable chlorine donor.
Blue	Paris Green	Cu(CH_{3}COO)_{2}.3Cu(AsO_{2})_{2}	Copper acetoarsenite, Emerald Green. Toxic. With potassium perchlorate produces the best blue colours. Non-hygroscopic. Fine powder readily becomes airborne; toxic inhalation hazard.
Blue	Copper arsenite	CuHAsO_{3}	Almost non-hygroscopic. Almost as good colorant as copper acetoarsenite. Toxic. Can be used with chlorate oxidizers.
Blue	Copper sulfate	CuSO_{4}·5 H_{2}O	Can be used with nitrates and perchlorates. Acidic, incompatible with chlorates. With red phosphorus in presence of moisture liberates heat, may spontaneously ignite. Less expensive than copper acetoarsenite. Anhydrous copper sulfate is hygroscopic, can be used as a desiccant. With ammonium perchlorate produces an almost as pretty a blue colour as achievable with copper acetoarsenite.
Blue	Copper metal	Cu	Rarely used, other compounds are easier to work with. Yields pretty blue colour in ammonium perchlorate based compositions; but reacts with ammonium perchlorate and liberates ammonia in presence of moisture. The composition must be kept dry.
Purple	Combination of red and blue compounds	Sr+Cu	
Purple	Rubidium compounds	Rb	rarely used
Silver/White	Aluminium powder	Al	
Silver/White	Magnesium powder	Mg	
Silver/White	Titanium powder	Ti	
Silver/White	Antimony (III) sulfide	Sb_{2}S_{3}	
Infrared	Caesium nitrate	CsNO_{3}	two powerful spectral lines at 852.113 nm and 894.347 nm
Infrared	Rubidium nitrate	RbNO_{3}	

== Radiating species ==
Despite the wide numbers of metal ion donors, they serve to form only a few atomic and molecular species that are useful as light emitters.

In many cases, chlorine donors have to be added in order to achieve sufficiently deep colours, as the desired emitting molecules have to be generated.

Some colour emitters are of atomic nature (e.g. lithium, sodium). Presence of chlorine, and the reaction to monochlorides, may actually impair their colour purity or intensity.

At high temperatures, the atoms will ionize. The emission spectra of ions are different than of neutral atoms; the ions may emit in undesired spectral ranges. For example, Ba^{+} emits in blue wavelengths. Ionization can be suppressed by addition of an easier-to-ionize metal with weak visible emission of its own, e.g. potassium; the potassium atoms then act as electron donors, neutralizing the barium ions.

The colour blue is notoriously difficult to produce in fireworks, as the copper compounds need to be heated at a specific temperature for the optimal shade of blue to be produced. Thus, a deep, rich blue is usually viewed as the mark of an experienced fireworks maker.

Care should be taken to avoid formation of solid particles in the flame zone, whether metal oxides or carbon; incandescent solid particles emit black-body radiation that causes "washing out" of the colours. Addition of aluminium raises the flame temperature but also leads to formation of solid incandescent particles of aluminium oxide and molten aluminium. Magnesium has less such effect and is therefore more suitable for coloured flames; it is more volatile than aluminium and more likely to be present as vapours than as particulates. Formation of solid particles of magnesium oxide can further be inhibited by presence of carbon monoxide, either by negative oxygen balance of the composition in presence of organic fuels, or by addition of the colorant in the form of an oxalate, which decomposes to carbon dioxide and carbon monoxide; the carbon monoxide reacts with the magnesium oxide particles to gaseous magnesium and gaseous carbon dioxide.

Colour	Emitter	Wavelengths	Notes
Yellow	Sodium (D-line)	589 nm	Very strong, overpowers other colours, avoid contamination
Orange	CaCl (molecular bands)	most intense: 591–599 nm and 603–608 nm, and others	
Red	SrCl (molecular bands)	a: 617–623 nm b: 627–635 nm c: 640–646 nm	The SrCl species tends to be oxidized to less desirable SrO; strontium-containing compositions are therefore usually formulated to be oxygen-deficient.
Red	SrOH(?) (molecular bands)	600–613 nm	
Red	Li (atomic spectral lines)		
Green	BaCl (molecular bands)	a: 511–515 nm b: 524–528 nm d: 530–533 nm	Lines of BaOH and BaO are also present, emitting in yellow and yellowish-green (487, 512, 740, 828, and 867 nm for BaOH, 549, 564, 604 and 649 for BaO). The BaOH lines are much stronger than the BaO lines. In absence of chlorine, the BaCl lines are not present and only the BaOH and BaO lines are visible. The BaCl species tends to be oxidized to less desirable BaO; barium-containing compositions are therefore usually formulated to be oxygen-deficient. Presence of Ba^{+} is undesired, as it emits in a blue region at 455.4 nm. Potassium may be added to suppress barium ionization, as it ionizes easier and acts as an electron donor for the barium ions.
Blue	CuCl (molecular bands)	several intense bands between 403–456 nm, less intense at 460–530 nm	Low dissociation energy of copper compounds causes presence of free copper atoms in the flame, weakly emitting in green (lines between 325–522 nm). In presence of chlorine, CuCl is formed, emitting strongly in blue. At higher temperatures CuCl dissociates and lines of atomic copper are present in the spectrum; CuO and CuOH are also formed, emitting molecular bands at green-yellow (535–555 nm) for CuOH and at orange-red (580–655 nm) for CuOH. Adequate control of temperature is therefore required for blue-burning compositions.
Infrared	Carbon particles	black-body radiation	For good broadband infrared output, compositions producing much heat and many carbon particles are required. The burning temperature should be lower than of visible-illuminating compounds. The intensity of the emitted radiation depends on the burn rate. Temperature can be increased by addition of magnesium. A magnesium/Teflon/Viton composition is common for missile decoy flares.
Infrared	CO_{2} (molecular bands)	mostly 4300 nm	Produced by carbon-containing fuels.
Infrared	Cs (atomic spectral lines)	two powerful spectral lines at 852.113 nm and 894.347 nm	Used in infrared illumination compositions. Metal is avoided in the compositions to prevent formation of bright, visible-radiating particles.
Infrared	Rb (atomic spectral lines)	spectral lines in near-infrared	Used in infrared illumination compositions, less commonly than caesium.

== See also ==
- Environmentally friendly red light flare
- Flame test
