= Strontium hydroxide =

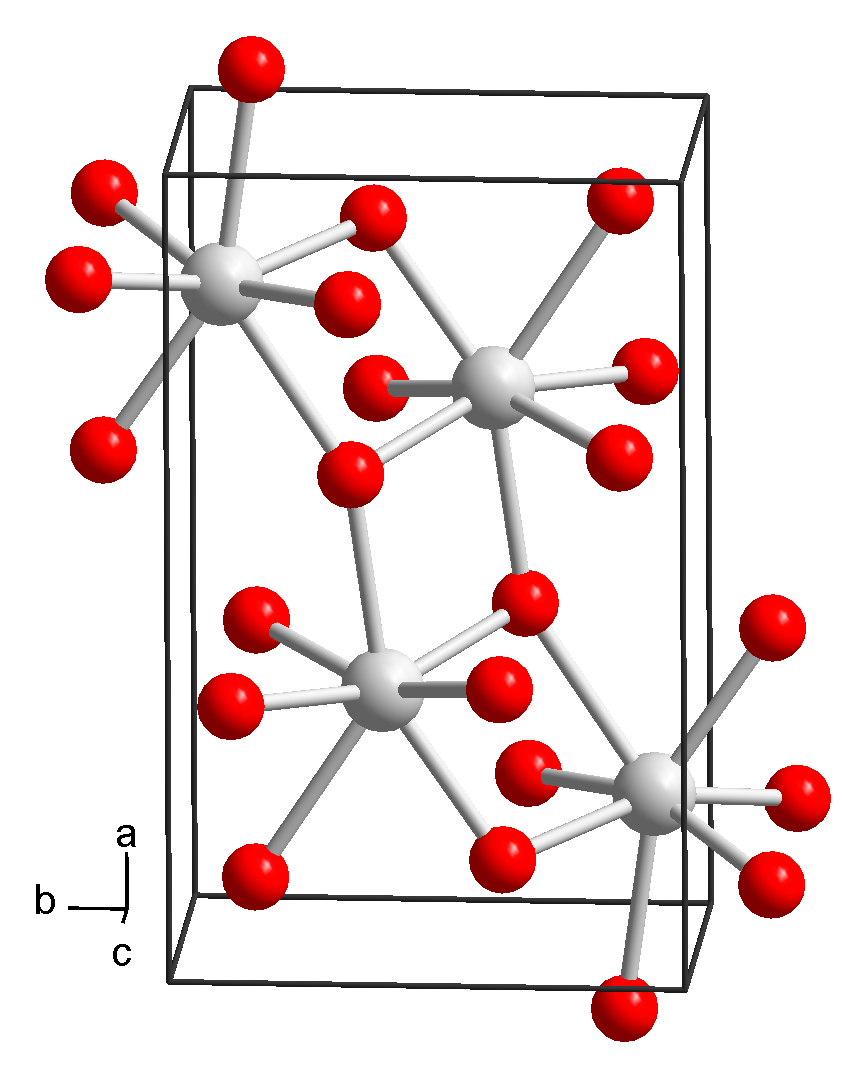

Identifiers
CAS Number	18480-07-4; 1311-10-0 (octahydrate)
3D model (JSmol)	Interactive image
ChEBI	CHEBI:35105
ChemSpider	79094
ECHA InfoCard	100.038.501
EC Number	242-367-1
Gmelin Reference	847042
PubChem CID	87672
UNII	EPK818UET5; T2B33T08R4 (octahydrate)
CompTox Dashboard (EPA)	DTXSID60893975
- InChI: InChI=1S/2H2O.Sr/h2*1H2;/q;;+2/p-2 Key: UUCCCPNEFXQJEL-UHFFFAOYSA-L; InChI=1/2H2O.Sr/h2*1H2;/q;;+2/p-2 Key: UUCCCPNEFXQJEL-NUQVWONBAP
- SMILES: [Sr+2].[OH-].[OH-]

Properties
Chemical formula	Sr(OH)_{2}
Molar mass	121.63 g⋅mol^{−1} (anhydrous); 139.65 g⋅mol^{−1} (monohydrate); 265.76 g⋅mol^{−1} (octahydrate)
Appearance	colourless orthorhombic crystals, hygroscopic
Density	3.625 g/cm^{3} (anhydrous); 1.90 g/cm^{3} (octahydrate)
Melting point	anhydrous: 535 °C (995 °F; 808 K): monohydrate: 450 °C (842 °F)) (decomposes to anhydrous); octahydrate: 102 °C (216 °F) (decomposes to heptahydrate)
Boiling point	710 °C (1,310 °F; 983 K): decomposes (anhydrous); dehydration above 850 °C (1,560 °F) produces SrO
Solubility in water	2.25 g/100 g
Basicity (pK_{b})	1st: 0.3; 2nd: 0.83
Magnetic susceptibility (χ)	−40.0×10^{−6} cm^{3}/mol

Structure
Crystal structure	Orthorhombic
Space group	Pmc2_{1} [26]
Point group	mm2
Lattice constant	a = 3.997 Å, b = 6.078 Å, c = 10.072 Å α = 90°, β = 90°, γ = 90°
Lattice volume (V)	244.677 Å^{3}
Formula units (Z)	4

Thermochemistry
Std enthalpy of formation (Δ_{f}H^{⦵}_{298})	−959.0 kJ⋅mol^{−1}
Enthalpy of fusion (Δ_{f}H^{⦵}_{fus})	23 kJ⋅mol^{−1}

Hazards
NFPA 704 (fire diamond)	1 0 1

Related compounds
Other anions	Strontium oxide; Strontium peroxide
Other cations	Magnesium hydroxide; Calcium hydroxide; Barium hydroxide
- Except where otherwise noted, data are given for materials in their standard state (at 25 °C [77 °F], 100 kPa). verify (what is ?) Infobox references

Strontium hydroxide, Sr(OH)_{2}, is a caustic alkali composed of one strontium ion and two hydroxide ions. It is synthesized by combining a strontium salt with a strong base. Sr(OH)_{2} exists in anhydrous, monohydrate, heptahydrate, and octahydrate form.

== Preparation ==
Because Sr(OH)_{2} is only slightly soluble in cold water, its preparation can be easily carried out by the addition of a strong base such as NaOH or KOH drop by drop to a solution of any soluble strontium salt, most commonly Sr(NO_{3})_{2} (strontium nitrate), which forms the octahydrate. This must be done in the absence of CO_{2} to prevent formation of the nearly insoluble carbonate which would complicate purification:

Sr(NO_{3})_{2}·4H_{2}O + 2 KOH + 4 H_{2}O → Sr(OH)_{2}·8H_{2}O + 2 KNO_{3}

The Sr(OH)_{2} will precipitate out as a fine white powder. From here, the solution is filtered, and the Sr(OH)_{2} is washed with a large excess of ice cold water and dried.

The anhydrous form or any of the hydrates may be prepared by adding one molar equivalent of water to strontium oxide (SrO). The hydrates may be prepared by adding the required amount of water (one, seven, or eight more molar equivalents) to the anhydrous form.

== Applications ==
Strontium hydroxide is used chiefly in the refining of beet sugar and as a stabilizer in plastic. It may be used as a source of strontium ions when the chlorine from strontium chloride (SrCl_{2}) is undesirable. Strontium hydroxide absorbs carbon dioxide (CO_{2}) from the air to form strontium carbonate (SrCO_{3}).

== Safety ==
Strontium hydroxide is a severe skin, eye and respiratory irritant. It is harmful if swallowed.
