= Strontium lactate =

Identifiers
CAS Number	29870-99-3
3D model (JSmol)	Interactive image
ChemSpider	171447
ECHA InfoCard	100.045.363
EC Number	249-915-9
PubChem CID	198085
UNII	DC1ZYY6LNZ
- InChI: InChI=1S/2C3H6O3.Sr/c2*1-2(4)3(5)6;/h2*2,4H,1H3,(H,5,6);/q;;+2/p-2 Key: CCUZKVDGQHXAFK-UHFFFAOYSA-L
- SMILES: CC(C(=O)[O-])O.CC(C(=O)[O-])O.[Sr+2]

Properties
Chemical formula	Sr(C_{3}H_{5}O_{3})_{2}
Molar mass	265.76
Appearance	white powder
Density	1.276 g/cm^{3}
Boiling point	227 °C (441 °F; 500 K)
Solubility in water	Soluble

Hazards
- GHS labelling
Pictograms	(GHS07: Exclamation mark)
Signal word	Warning
Hazard statements	H302, H312, H315, H319, H332, H335
Precautionary statements	P261, P280, P301+P312, P302+P352, P304+P340, P305+P351+P338, P332+P313
NFPA 704 (fire diamond)	1 1 0
Flash point	109 °C (228 °F; 382 K)
- Lethal dose or concentration (LD, LC)
LD_{50} (median dose)	900 mg/kg (Rat, intraperitoneal)
- Except where otherwise noted, data are given for materials in their standard state (at 25 °C [77 °F], 100 kPa). Infobox references

Strontium lactate is a chemical compound, a salt of strontium and lactic acid with the formula Sr(C_{3}H_{5}O_{3})_{2}.

== Synthesis ==
Strontium lactate can be obtained by neutralizing moderately dilute lactic acid with strontium carbonate or hydroxide and evaporating the resulting solution to dryness with a moderate heat.
