= Strontium sulfide =

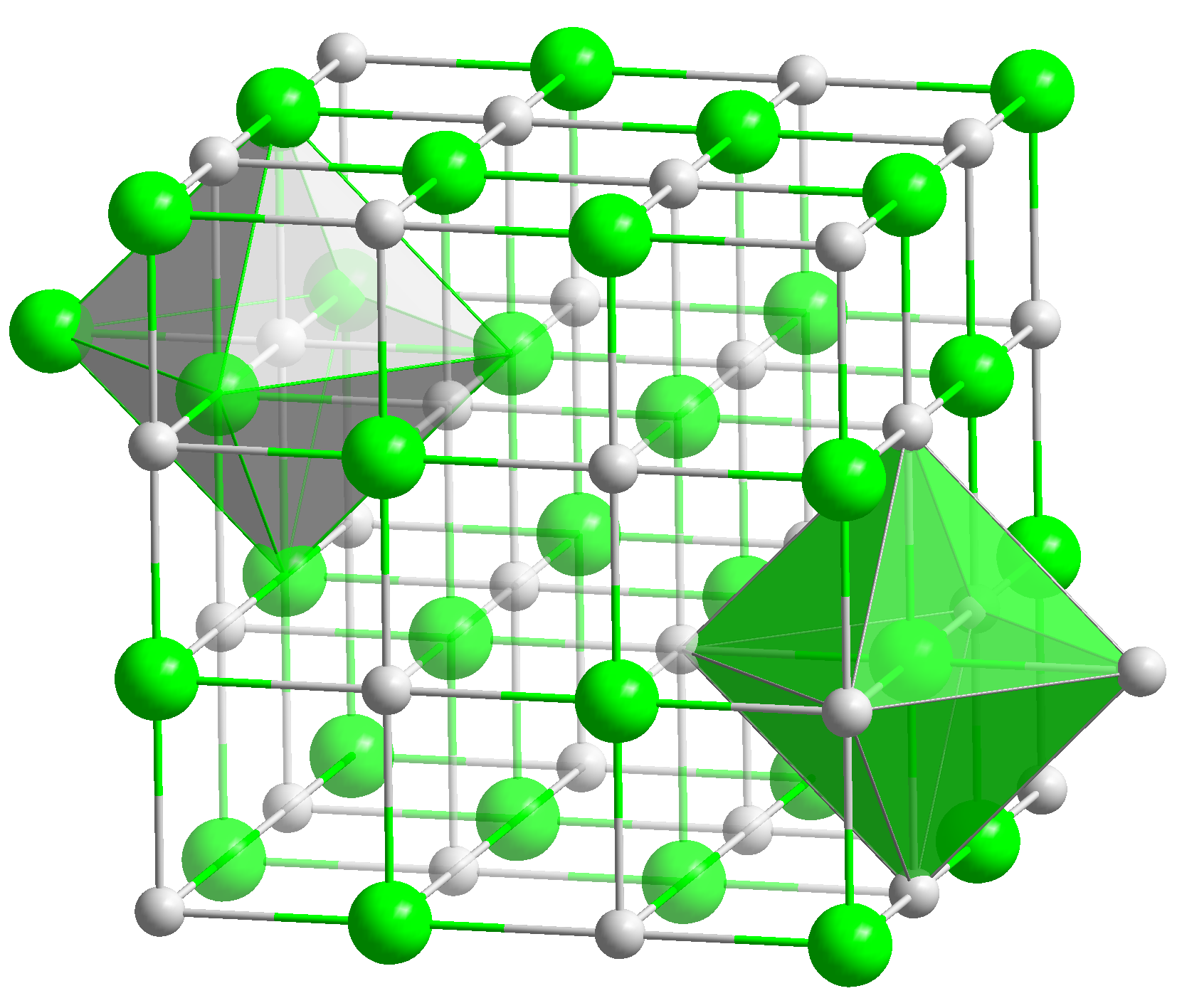

Names
- Other names Strontium monosulfide C.I. 77847

Identifiers
CAS Number	1314-96-1
3D model (JSmol)	Interactive image
ChemSpider	8394912
ECHA InfoCard	100.013.864
EC Number	215-249-2
PubChem CID	14820
UNII	06I13IA27T
CompTox Dashboard (EPA)	DTXSID70927179
- InChI: Key: XXCMBPUMZXRBTN-UHFFFAOYSA-N; InChI=1S/S.Sr
- SMILES: S=[Sr]

Properties
Chemical formula	SrS
Molar mass	119.68 g/mol
Appearance	white solid (spoiled samples are colored)
Odor	none (degraded samples smell of hydrogen sulfide)
Density	3.70 g/cm^{3}
Melting point	2,002 °C (3,636 °F; 2,275 K)
Solubility in water	slightly soluble
Solubility in acids	decomposes
Refractive index (n_{D})	2.107

Structure
Crystal structure	Halite (cubic), cF8
Space group	Fm3̅m, No. 225
Coordination geometry	Octahedral (Sr^{2+}); octahedral (S^{2−})

Hazards
- GHS labelling
Pictograms	(GHS05: Corrosive) (GHS07: Exclamation mark) (GHS09: Environmental hazard)
Signal word	Danger
Hazard statements	H290, H302, H314, H400
Precautionary statements	P234, P260, P264, P264+P265, P270, P273, P280, P301+P317, P301+P330+P331, P302+P361+P354, P304+P340, P305+P354+P338, P316, P317, P321, P330, P363, P390, P391, P405, P501
Safety data sheet (SDS)	External MSDS

Related compounds
Other anions	Strontium oxide Strontium selenide
Other cations	Magnesium sulfide Calcium sulfide Barium sulfide
- Except where otherwise noted, data are given for materials in their standard state (at 25 °C [77 °F], 100 kPa). verify (what is ?) Infobox references

Strontium sulfide is the inorganic compound with the formula SrS. It is a white solid. The compound is an intermediate in the conversion of strontium sulfate, the main strontium ore called celestite (or, more correctly, celestine), to other more useful compounds.

== Production and reactions ==
Strontium sulfide is produced by roasting celestine with coke at 1100–1300 °C. The sulfate is reduced, leaving the sulfide:

SrSO_{4} + 2 C → SrS + 2 CO_{2}

About 300,000 tons are processed in this way annually. Both luminous and nonluminous sulfide phases are known, impurities, defects, and dopants being important.

As expected for a sulfide salt of alkaline earth, the sulfide hydrolyzes readily:

SrS + 2 H_{2}O → Sr(OH)_{2} + H_{2}S

For this reason, samples of SrS have an odor of rotten eggs.

Similar reactions are used in the production of commercially useful compounds, including the most useful strontium compound, strontium carbonate: a mixture of strontium sulfide with either carbon dioxide gas or sodium carbonate leads to formation of a precipitate of strontium carbonate.

SrS + H_{2}O + CO_{2} → SrCO_{3} + H_{2}S
SrS + Na_{2}CO_{3} → SrCO_{3} + Na_{2}S

Strontium nitrate can also be prepared in this way.
