= Environmentally friendly red light flare =

An environmentally friendly red-light flare is a pyrotechnic (firework) flare which used lithium-based formulations that emitted red light. A flare is used for signaling, illumination, or defensive countermeasures in civilian or military applications. It is based on a non-hygroscopic (not absorbing air) dilithium nitrogen-rich salt that served as an oxidizer and red colorant. The U.S. Army Research Laboratory and LMU Munich were credited as the research facilities for developing this product announced in January 2018.

== Formulation ==
As of 2018, this is the first documented red-light flare compound that is based on lithium and does not contain any perchlorates, halogenated materials, or strontium-based materials. This formulation was assessed as having high color quality. To achieve the red-light emission from the flare, the authors report a formulation mixture of powdered magnesium and hexamine as fuels, nitrocellulose, an epoxy binder system, and lithium-based nitrogen salts as the oxidizer and color agent. When burned, users could observe a cool burning flame emitting a deep red color.

Previously, many formulations for red-light-emitting pyrotechnics depended on a chemical reaction involving strontium chloride (SrCl). SrCl emits the red color after the flare is ignited. This chemical compound is known as a metastable molecular emitter, meaning, it is not stable at low temperatures but stable in excited high-temperature combustion processes.

== History ==
Before 2018, the formulations for red-light emitting pyrotechnic formulations included powdered metal fuels like magnesium, aluminum, strontium nitrate and perchlorate oxidizers, as well as carbon-based chlorinated organic materials such as poly(vinyl) chloride.

In 2014, the EPA made a decision to develop regulations on the amount of strontium present in drinking water. Strontium had been detected in 99% of all public U.S. water systems and at levels of concern in 7%. The agency reported that strontium is potentially harmful to human health. This chemical replaces calcium in the bone, interferes with bone strength, and affects skeletal development. The U.S. military training grounds were not included in the above study; therefore, the presence or percentage of strontium in their water systems were unknown. However, strontium was identified to be present in the red flares and signaling fireworks available in 2014. Due to these finding, the developers of the environmentally friendly red-light flare concluded that the development of environmentally safer flares was a necessity for users.

== See also ==
- Colored fire
- Pyrotechnic colorant
