= Strontium sulfate =

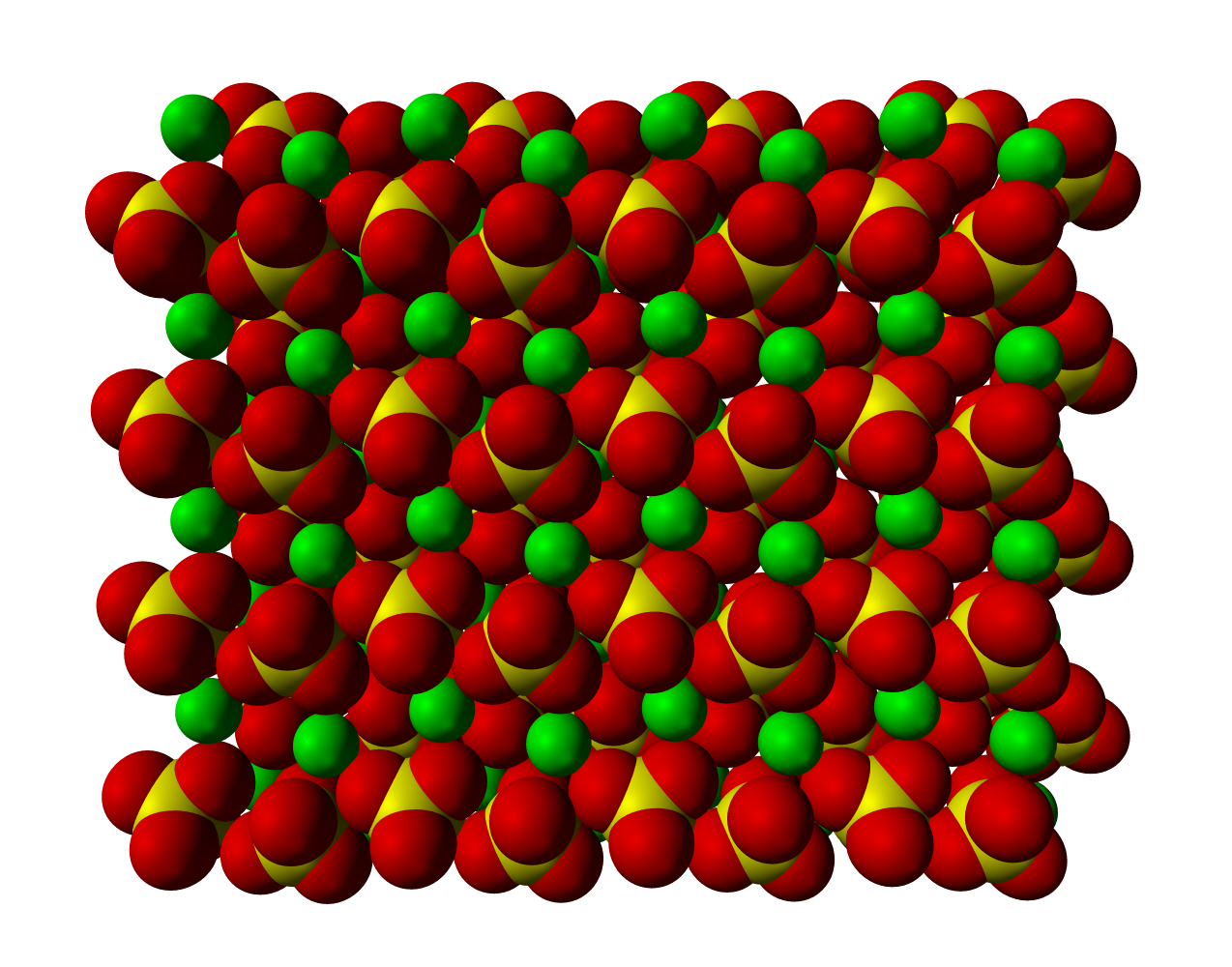

Names
- IUPAC name Strontium sulfate
- Other names Celestine

Identifiers
| CAS Number | 7759-02-6 |
| 3D model (JSmol) | Interactive image |
| ChemSpider | 2341151 |
| ECHA InfoCard | 100.028.955 |
| EC Number | 231-850-2 |
| PubChem CID | 3084026 |
| UNII | 7Q3KX2L47F |
| CompTox Dashboard (EPA) | DTXSID10884419 |
- InChI: InChI=1S/H2O4S.Sr/c1-5(2,3)4;/h(H2,1,2,3,4);/q;+2/p-2 Key: UBXAKNTVXQMEAG-UHFFFAOYSA-L; InChI=1/H2O4S.Sr/c1-5(2,3)4;/h(H2,1,2,3,4);/q;+2/p-2 Key: UBXAKNTVXQMEAG-NUQVWONBAV
- SMILES: [Sr+2].[O-]S([O-])(=O)=O

Properties
| Chemical formula | SrSO_{4} |
| Molar mass | 183.68 g·mol^{−1} |
| Appearance | white orthorhombic crystals |
| Density | 3.96 g/cm^{3} |
| Melting point | 1,606 °C (2,923 °F; 1,879 K) |
| Solubility in water | 0.00138 g/100 mL |
| Solubility product (K_{sp}) | 3.44×10^{−7} |
| Solubility | slightly soluble in acids |
| Band gap | 5.92 eV |
| Magnetic susceptibility (χ) | −57.9×10^{−6} cm^{3}/mol |
| Refractive index (n_{D}) | 1.622 |

Structure
| Crystal structure | Orthorhombic |
| Space group | Pnma, No. 62 |
| Point group | mmm |
| Lattice constant | a = 5.34 Å, b = 6.87 Å, c = 8.36 Å α = 90°, β = 90°, γ = 90° |
| Lattice volume (V) | 306.72 Å^{3} |
| Formula units (Z) | 4 |

Thermochemistry
| Std molar entropy (S^{⦵}_{298}) | 117.0 J⋅mol^{−1}·K^{-1} |
| Std enthalpy of formation (Δ_{f}H^{⦵}_{298}) | −1453.1 kJ⋅mol^{−1} |
| Gibbs free energy (Δ_{f}G^{⦵}) | −1340.9 kJ⋅mol^{−1} |
| Enthalpy of fusion (Δ_{f}H^{⦵}_{fus}) | 36 kJ⋅mol^{−1} |

Hazards
- GHS labelling
| Pictograms | (GHS07: Exclamation mark) |
| Signal word | Warning |
| Hazard statements | H302, H315, H319, H335 |
| Precautionary statements | P261, P305+P351+P338 |
| NFPA 704 (fire diamond) | 0 0 0 |

Related compounds
| Other anions | Strontium chloride; Strontium oxide; Strontium sulfite |
| Other cations | Beryllium sulfate; Magnesium sulfate; Calcium sulfate; Barium sulfate |
- Except where otherwise noted, data are given for materials in their standard state (at 25 °C [77 °F], 100 kPa). verify (what is ?) Infobox references

Strontium sulfate (SrSO_{4}) is the sulfate salt of strontium. It is a white crystalline powder and occurs in nature as the mineral celestine. It is very poorly soluble in water.

== Structure ==
Strontium sulfate is a polymeric material, isostructural with barium sulfate.

== Applications and chemistry ==
Strontium sulfate is of interest as a naturally occurring precursor to other strontium compounds, which are more useful. In industry it is converted to strontium carbonate (SrCO_{3}) for use as ceramic precursor and strontium nitrate (Sr(NO_{3})_{2}) for use in pyrotechnics.

The low aqueous solubility of strontium sulfate can lead to scale formation in processes where these ions meet. For example, it can form on surfaces of equipment in underground oil wells depending on the groundwater conditions.

=== Pyrotechnics ===
Strontium sulfate is used as a high temperature / flash phase oxidizer in some red strobing compositions, along with ammonium perchlorate (NH_{4}ClO_{4}) and treated magnesium or magnalium powder. One theory as to why this occurs is that the ammonium perchlorate sustains combustion at a very low temperature until enough heat has built up for the sulfate combustion reaction to occur. This reaction is extremely rapid and consumes the portion of the composition that was hot enough for the sulfate to act as an oxidizer producing a rapid flash of light, the ammonium perchlorate-metal portion of the composition continues burning with very little flame, and the cycle repeats.

== Biological role ==
Crystallized strontium sulfate is utilized by a small group of radiolarian protozoa, called the Acantharea, as a main constituent of their skeleton.
