= Barium cyanide =

Names
- IUPAC name Barium dicyanide

Identifiers
CAS Number	542-62-1
3D model (JSmol)	Interactive image
ChemSpider	10496
ECHA InfoCard	100.008.021
EC Number	208-882-3
PubChem CID	10961
UNII	62X6NA0R43
CompTox Dashboard (EPA)	DTXSID3023895
- InChI: InChI=1S/2CN.Ba/c2*1-2;/q2*-1;+2 Key: UNLSXXHOHZUADN-UHFFFAOYSA-N; InChI=1/2CN.Ba/c2*1-2;/q2*-1;+2 Key: UNLSXXHOHZUADN-UHFFFAOYAI
- SMILES: [Ba+2].[C-]#N.[C-]#N

Properties
Chemical formula	Ba(CN)_{2}
Molar mass	189.362 g/mol
Appearance	white crystalline powder
Melting point	600 °C (1,112 °F; 873 K)
Solubility in water	80 g/100 mL (14 °C)
Solubility	Soluble in ethanol
Vapor pressure	740 mmHg

Hazards
- GHS labelling
Pictograms	(GHS06: Toxic) (GHS09: Environmental hazard)
Signal word	Danger
Hazard statements	H300, H310, H330, H410
Precautionary statements	P260, P262, P264, P270, P271, P273, P280, P284, P301+P316, P302+P352, P304+P340, P316, P320, P321, P330, P361+P364, P391, P403+P233, P405, P501
NFPA 704 (fire diamond)	4 0 0
- Except where otherwise noted, data are given for materials in their standard state (at 25 °C [77 °F], 100 kPa). Infobox references

Barium cyanide is a chemical compound with the formula Ba(CN)_{2}. It is synthesized by the reaction of hydrogen cyanide and barium hydroxide in water or petroleum ether. It is a white crystalline salt.

== Uses ==
Barium cyanide is used in electroplating and other metallurgical processes.

== Preparation ==
Barium cyanide is prepared by reacting barium hydroxide with hydrocyanic acid:

Ba(OH)_{2} + 2HCN → Ba(CN)_{2} +2H_{2}O

The product is crystallized from the solution.

== Reactions ==
Barium cyanide reacts with water and carbon dioxide in air slowly, producing highly toxic hydrogen cyanide gas.

When barium cyanide is heated to 300°C with steam present, the nitrogen evolves to ammonia, leaving barium formate.

Ba(CN)_{2} + 4 H_{2}O = Ba(HCOO)_{2} + 2 NH_{3}

Aqueous solutions of barium cyanide dissolve insoluble cyanides of some of the heavy metals forming crystalline double salts. For example, BaHg(CN)_{4}.3H_{2}O in needles, 2Ba(CN)_{2}.3Hg(CN)_{2}.23H_{2}O in transparent octahedra, and Ba(CN)_{2}.Hg(CN)_{2}.HgI_{2}.6H_{2}O.
