= Ammonium arsenate =

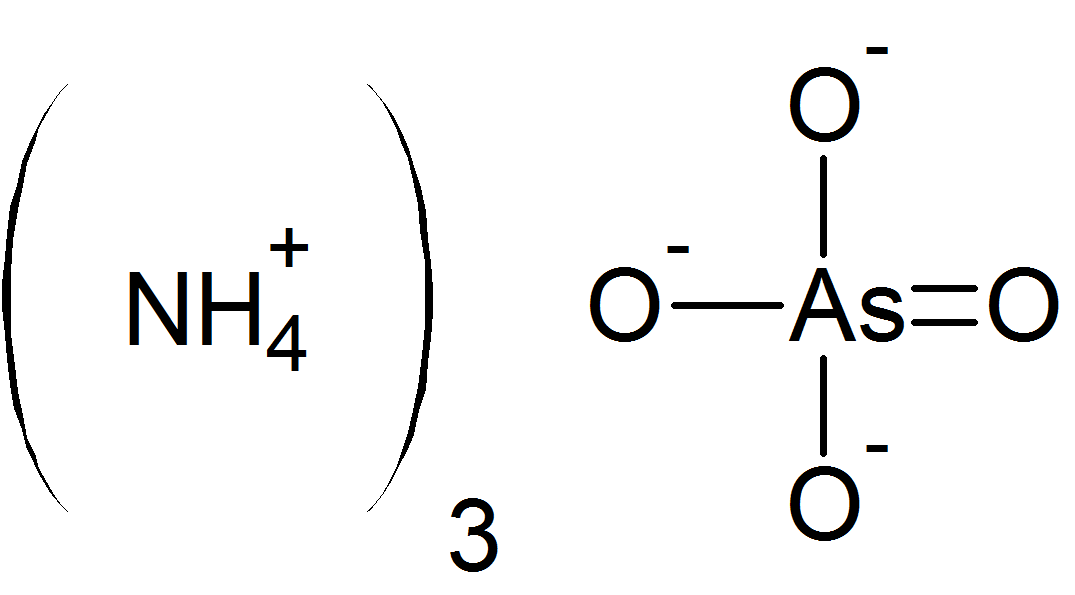

Names
- Other names Ammonium orthoarsenate

Identifiers
CAS Number	24719-13-9
3D model (JSmol)	Interactive image
ChemSpider	11663170
ECHA InfoCard	100.029.152
EC Number	246-428-3
PubChem CID	18762179
CompTox Dashboard (EPA)	DTXSID0036895
- InChI: InChI=1S/AsH3O4.3H3N/c2-1(3,4)5;;;/h(H3,2,3,4,5);3*1H3 Key: SNSGFXVMSAYXTC-UHFFFAOYSA-N; InChI=1/AsH3O4.2H3N/c2-1(3,4)5;;/h(H3,2,3,4,5);2*1H3 Key: XPVHUBFHKQQSDA-UHFFFAOYAT
- SMILES: [NH4+].[NH4+].[NH4+].[O-][As](=O)([O-])[O-]

Properties
Chemical formula	(NH_{4})_{3}AsO_{4} . 3 H_{2}O
Molar mass	247.1 (trihydrate)
Solubility in water	Soluble
- Except where otherwise noted, data are given for materials in their standard state (at 25 °C [77 °F], 100 kPa). verify (what is ?) Infobox references

Ammonium arsenate is the inorganic compound with the formula (NH_{4})_{3}AsO_{4}. It is prepared by treating a concentrated solution of arsenic acid with ammonia, resulting in precipitation of colorless crystals of the trihydrate. Upon heating, it releases ammonia.

Like other compounds of arsenic, it is classified as an IARC Group 1 carcinogen, i.e. carcinogenic to humans.

Acid salts are also known, including diammonium arsenate and ammonium dihydrogen arsenate.
