= Strontium perchlorate =

Chemical compound (Sr(ClO4)2)

Names
- Other names Strontium(II) perchlorate; Strontium diperchlorate

Identifiers
CAS Number	13450-97-0
3D model (JSmol)	Interactive image
ChemSpider	55515
ECHA InfoCard	100.033.272
EC Number	236-614-2
PubChem CID	61607
CompTox Dashboard (EPA)	DTXSID30890693
- InChI: InChI=1S/2ClHO4.Sr/c2*2-1(3,4)5;/h2*(H,2,3,4,5);/q;;+2/p-2 Key: MXRFIUHRIOLIIV-UHFFFAOYSA-L
- SMILES: [O-]Cl(=O)(=O)=O.[O-]Cl(=O)(=O)=O.[Sr+2]

Properties
Chemical formula	Sr(ClO_{4})_{2}
Molar mass	286.51 g·mol^{−1}
Appearance	White crystals
Density	2.973 g/cm^{3}
Melting point	477 °C (891 °F; 750 K) (decomposes vigorously)
Solubility in water	309.7 g/100 g
Solubility in ethyl acetate	136.9 g/100 g
Solubility in methanol	221.0 g/100 g
Solubility in ethanol	180.7 g/100 g
Solubility in 1-propanol	140.4 g/100 g
Solubility in 1-butanol	113.5 g/100 g
Solubility in isobutanol	77.9 g/100 g
Solubility in acetone	140.1 g/100 g

Structure
Crystal structure	orthorhombic
Space group	Pbca
Lattice constant	a = 14.18206 Å, b = 9.78934 Å, c = 9.37624 Å α = 10.009°, β = 90°, γ = 90°
Lattice volume (V)	1301.73 Å^{3}
Coordination geometry	8

Hazards
- GHS labelling
Pictograms	(GHS03: Oxidizing) (GHS07: Exclamation mark)
Signal word	Danger
Hazard statements	H272, H315, H319, H335
Precautionary statements	P210, P221, P280, P305+P351+P338, P403+P233, P501
NFPA 704 (fire diamond)	1 3 0 OX
- Except where otherwise noted, data are given for materials in their standard state (at 25 °C [77 °F], 100 kPa). Infobox references

Strontium perchlorate is a deliquescent white crystalline compound with the formula Sr(ClO_{4})_{2}.

It is a strong oxidizer which gives red flames. It can be used in pyrotechnics; however, usually the more common strontium nitrate is used. Strontium perchlorate has been used in gelled flame compositions where its hygroscopic nature isn't an issue, in a polymerized candle composition that excluded water, and in an experimental high-atmosphere flash powder.

It is also used in Liquid Injection Thrust Vector Control (LITVC) in solid-propellant rockets to enable steering control with a simple fixed nozzle.

Strontium perchlorate has been characterized in multiple hydrated forms; a trihydrate (Sr(ClO_{4})_{2}·3H_{2}O), tetrahydrate (Sr(ClO_{4})_{2}·4H_{2}O) and nonahydrate (Sr(ClO_{4})_{2}·9H_{2}O).

== Synthesis ==
Hydrated forms may be prepared by dissolving pure strontium nitrate in an excess of perchloric acid, neutralizing the excess acid with strontium carbonate, centrifuging off solids, and chilling to precipitate crystals.

The anhydrous form may be prepared by drying the hydrate at 250 °C (482 °F), which gives a yield of 50%, or by the addition of anhydrous perchloric acid to a solution of strontium ion in anhydrous trifluoroacetic acid followed by filtration of the precipitated solid and removal of excess acid under vacuum.
