= Strontium peroxide =

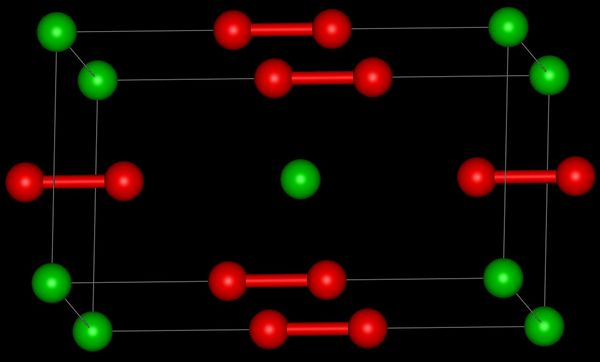

Identifiers
CAS Number	1314-18-7
3D model (JSmol)	Interactive image
ChemSpider	14123
ECHA InfoCard	100.013.841
EC Number	215-224-6
PubChem CID	14807
UNII	E0830P344P
UN number	1509 (STRONTIUM PEROXIDE)
CompTox Dashboard (EPA)	DTXSID80905100
- InChI: Key: UHCGLDSRFKGERO-UHFFFAOYSA-N; InChI=1S/O2.Sr/c1-2;/q-2;+2
- SMILES: [O-][O-].[Sr+2]

Properties
Chemical formula	SrO_{2}
Molar mass	119.619 g/mol
Appearance	white powder
Odor	odorless
Density	4.56 g/cm^{3} (anhydrous) 1.91 g/cm^{3} (octahydrate)
Melting point	215 °C (419 °F; 488 K) (decomposes)
Solubility in water	slightly soluble
Solubility	very soluble in alcohol, ammonium chloride insoluble in acetone

Structure
Crystal structure	Tetragonal
Space group	D^{17}_{4h}, I4/mmm, tI6
Coordination geometry	6

Hazards
- GHS labelling
Pictograms	(GHS03: Oxidizing) (GHS05: Corrosive) (GHS07: Exclamation mark)
Signal word	Danger
Hazard statements	H302, H312, H317, H331, H350
Precautionary statements	P220, P261, P280, P305+P351+P338
- Except where otherwise noted, data are given for materials in their standard state (at 25 °C [77 °F], 100 kPa). verify (what is ?) Infobox references

Strontium peroxide is an inorganic compound with the formula Sr O_{2} that exists in both anhydrous and octahydrate form, both of which are white solids. The anhydrous form adopts a structure similar to that of calcium carbide.

== Uses ==
It is an oxidizing agent used for bleaching. It is used in some pyrotechnic compositions as an oxidizer and a vivid red pyrotechnic colorant. It can also be used as an antiseptic and in tracer munitions.

== Production ==
Strontium peroxide is produced by passing oxygen over heated strontium oxide. Upon heating in the absence of O_{2}, it degrades to SrO and O_{2}. It is more thermally labile than BaO_{2}.

== See also ==
- Barium peroxide
- Strontium oxide
