= Strontium oxide =

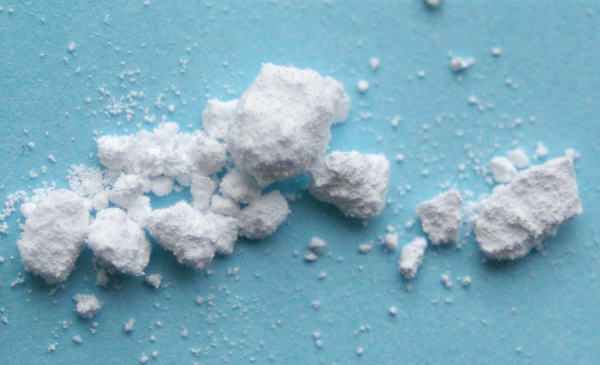
- __ Sr^{2+} __ O^{2−}

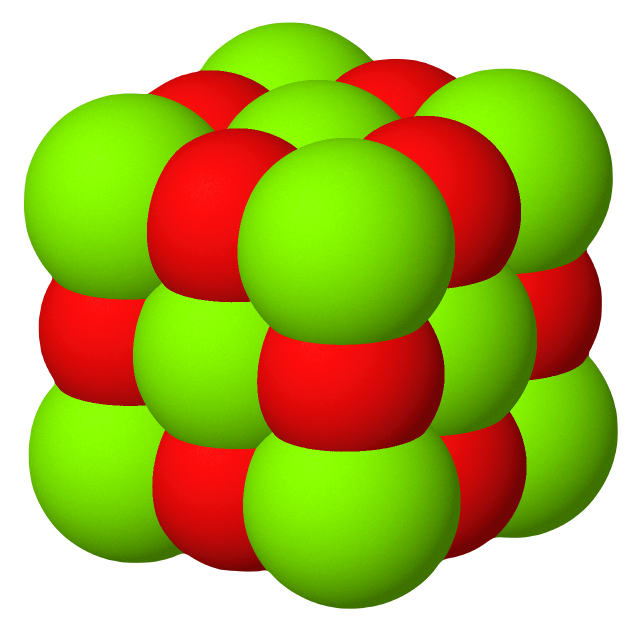

Names
- IUPAC name Strontium oxide
- Other names Strontia

Identifiers
CAS Number	1314-11-0
3D model (JSmol)	Interactive image
ChemSpider	66603
ECHA InfoCard	100.013.837
EC Number	215-219-9
PubChem CID	73975
UNII	64RA22280P
CompTox Dashboard (EPA)	DTXSID00893853
- InChI: InChI=1S/O.Sr/q-2;+2 Key: IATRAKWUXMZMIY-UHFFFAOYSA-N
- SMILES: [O-2].[Sr+2]

Properties
Chemical formula	SrO
Molar mass	103.619 g/mol
Appearance	colorless cubic crystals
Density	4.70 g/cm^{3}
Melting point	2,531 °C (4,588 °F; 2,804 K)
Boiling point	3,200 °C (5,790 °F; 3,470 K) (decomposes)
Solubility in water	reacts, forms Sr(OH)_{2}
Solubility	miscible with potassium hydroxide slightly soluble in alcohol insoluble in acetone and ether
Magnetic susceptibility (χ)	−35.0·10^{−6} cm^{3}/mol
Refractive index (n_{D})	1.810

Structure
Crystal structure	Halite (cubic), cF8
Space group	Fm3̅m, No. 225
Coordination geometry	Octahedral (Sr^{2+}); octahedral (O^{2−})

Thermochemistry
Heat capacity (C)	44.3 J·mol^{−1}·K^{−1}
Std molar entropy (S^{⦵}_{298})	57.2 J·mol^{−1}·K^{−1}
Std enthalpy of formation (Δ_{f}H^{⦵}_{298})	−592.0 kJ·mol^{−1}

Hazards
- GHS labelling
Pictograms	(GHS05: Corrosive)
Signal word	Danger
Hazard statements	H314
Precautionary statements	P260, P264, P264+P265, P280, P301+P330+P331, P302+P361+P354, P304+P340, P305+P354+P338, P316, P317, P321, P363, P405, P501
Flash point	Non-flammable

Related compounds
Other anions	Strontium sulfide
Other cations	Beryllium oxide Magnesium oxide Calcium oxide Barium oxide
Related compounds	Strontium hydroxide
- Except where otherwise noted, data are given for materials in their standard state (at 25 °C [77 °F], 100 kPa). verify (what is ?) Infobox references

Strontium oxide or strontia, SrO, is formed when strontium reacts with oxygen. Burning strontium in air results in a mixture of strontium oxide and strontium nitride. It also forms from the decomposition of strontium carbonate SrCO_{3}. It is a strongly basic oxide.

== Uses ==
About 8% by weight of cathode-ray tubes is strontium oxide, which has been the major use of strontium since 1970. Color televisions and other devices containing color cathode-ray tubes sold in the United States are required by law to use strontium in the faceplate to block X-ray emission (these X-ray emitting TVs are no longer in production). Lead(II) oxide can be used in the neck and funnel, but causes discoloration when used in the faceplate.

== Reactions ==
Elemental strontium is formed when strontium oxide is heated with aluminium in a vacuum.
