= Strontium chloride =

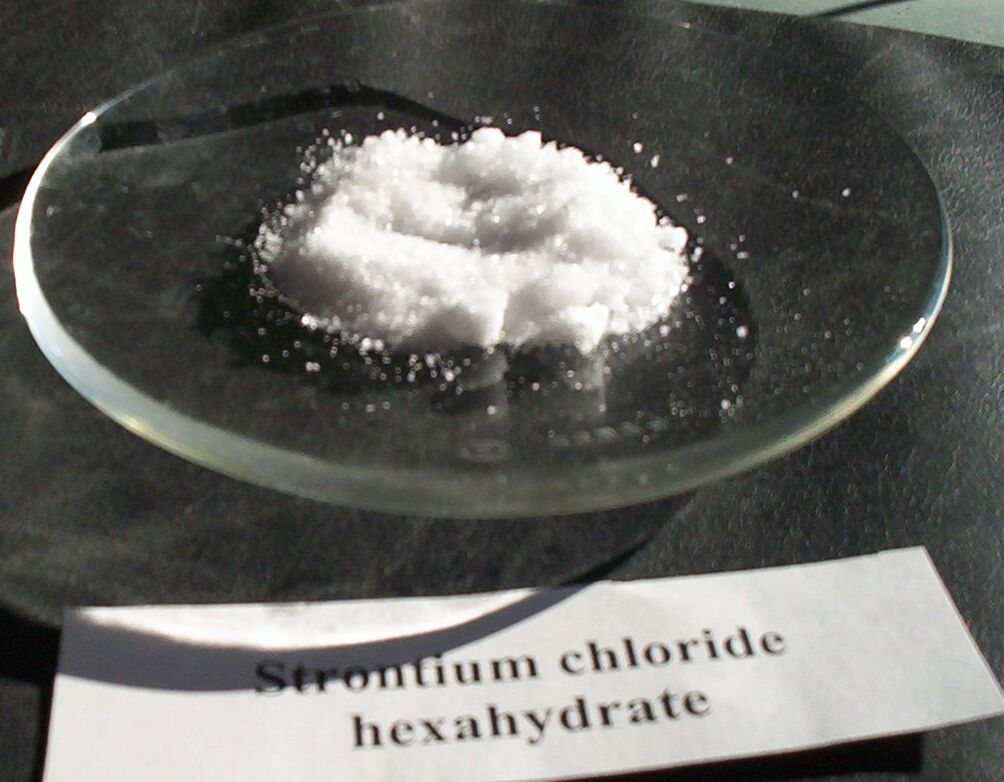
- Strontium chloride hexahydrate

Names
- IUPAC name Strontium chloride
- Other names Strontium(II) chloride

Identifiers
CAS Number	10476-85-4; 10025-70-4 (hexahydrate)
3D model (JSmol)	Interactive image
ChEBI	CHEBI:36383
ChEMBL	ChEMBL2219640
ChemSpider	55440
ECHA InfoCard	100.030.870
EC Number	233-971-6
PubChem CID	61520
UNII	EKE8PS9J6Z; O09USB7Z44 (hexahydrate)
CompTox Dashboard (EPA)	DTXSID6040616
- InChI: InChI=1S/2ClH.Sr/h2*1H;/q;;+2/p-2 Key: AHBGXTDRMVNFER-UHFFFAOYSA-L; InChI=1S/2ClH.Sr/h2*1H;/q;;+2/p-2; Key: AHBGXTDRMVNFER-UHFFFAOYSA-L
- SMILES: [Sr+2].[Cl-].[Cl-]

Properties
Chemical formula	SrCl_{2}
Molar mass	158.53 g/mol (anhydrous); 266.62 g/mol (hexahydrate)
Appearance	White crystalline solid
Density	3.052 g/cm^{3} (anhydrous, monoclinic form); 2.672 g/cm^{3} (dihydrate); 1.930 g/cm^{3} (hexahydrate)
Melting point	874 °C (1,605 °F) (anhydrous); 61 °C (142 °F) (hexahydrate, decomposes)
Boiling point	1,250 °C (2,280 °F; 1,520 K) (anhydrous)
Solubility in water	anhydrous: 53.8 g/100mL (20 °C (68 °F)); hexahydrate: 106 g/100mL (0 °C (32 °F)); 206 g/100mL (40 °C (104 °F))
Solubility in ethanol	very slight
Solubility in acetone	very slight
Band gap	5.23 eV
Magnetic susceptibility (χ)	−63.0×10^{−6} cm^{3}/mol
Refractive index (n_{D})	1.650 (anhydrous); 1.594 (dihydrate); 1.536 (hexahydrate)

Structure
Crystal structure	Fluorite structure
Space group	Fm3̅m
Point group	m3̅m
Lattice constant	a = 7.00 Å, b = 7.00 Å, c = 7.00 Å α = 90°, β = 90°, γ = 90°
Lattice volume (V)	342.93 Å^{3}
Formula units (Z)	4
Coordination geometry	Body-centered cubic at Sr^{2+} to 8 equivalent Cl^{−}; Tetrahedral at Cl^{−} to 4 equivalent Sr^{2+}

Hazards
- Occupational safety and health (OHS/OSH)
Main hazards	Irritant
NFPA 704 (fire diamond)	2 0 0

Related compounds
Other anions	Strontium fluoride; Strontium bromide; Strontium iodide
Other cations	Beryllium chloride; Magnesium chloride; Calcium chloride; Barium chloride; Radium chloride
- Except where otherwise noted, data are given for materials in their standard state (at 25 °C [77 °F], 100 kPa). verify (what is ?) Infobox references

Strontium chloride (SrCl_{2}) is a salt of strontium and chloride. It is a "typical" salt, forming neutral aqueous solutions. As with all compounds of strontium, this salt emits a bright red colour in flame. Its properties are intermediate between those for barium chloride, which is more toxic, and calcium chloride.

== Preparation ==
Strontium chloride can be prepared by treating aqueous strontium hydroxide or strontium carbonate with hydrochloric acid:

Sr(OH)_{2} + 2 HCl → SrCl_{2} + 2 H_{2}O

Crystallization from cold aqueous solution gives the hexahydrate (SrCl_{2}·6H_{2}O. Dehydration of this salt occurs in stages, commencing above 61 °C (142 °F). Full dehydration occurs at 320 °C (608 °F).

== Structure ==
In the solid state, SrCl_{2} adopts a fluorite structure. In the vapour phase the SrCl_{2} molecule is non-linear with a Cl−Sr−Cl angle of approximately 130°. This is an exception to VSEPR theory which would predict a linear structure. Ab initio calculations have been cited to propose that contributions from d orbitals in the shell below the valence shell are responsible. Another proposal is that polarisation of the electron core of the strontium atom causes a distortion of the core electron density that interacts with the Sr−Cl bonds.

== Uses ==
Strontium chloride is a precursor to other compounds of strontium, such as yellow strontium chromate (SrCrO_{4}, strontium carbonate (SrCO_{3}), and strontium sulfate (SrSO_{4}). Exposure of aqueous solutions of strontium chloride to the sodium salt of the desired anion often leads to formation of the solid precipitate:

SrCl_{2} + Na_{2}CrO_{4} → SrCrO_{4} + 2 NaCl
SrCl_{2} + Na_{2}CO_{3} → SrCO_{3} + 2 NaCl
SrCl_{2} + Na_{2}SO_{4} → SrSO_{4} + 2 NaCl

It is employed in small quantities in glass-making and metallurgy. The radioactive isotope strontium-89, used for the treatment of bone cancer, is usually administered in the form of strontium chloride.

Seawater aquariums require small amounts of strontium chloride, which is consumed during the growth of certain plankton.

=== Dental care ===
SrCl_{2} is marketed as being useful for reducing tooth sensitivity by forming a barrier over microscopic tubules in the dentin containing nerve endings that have become exposed by gum recession. Known in the U.S. as Elecol and Sensodyne, these products are called strontium chloride toothpastes, although most now use strontium acetate (Sr(CH_{3}COO)_{2}) or potassium nitrate (KNO_{3}) instead which works as an analgesic rather than a barrier. A literature review of studies which met criteria found that neither is very effective at reducing dentine hypersensitivity.

=== Biological research ===
Brief strontium chloride exposure induces parthenogenetic activation of oocytes. This property is used in developmental biological research.

=== Ammonia storage ===
A commercial company is using a strontium chloride-based artificial solid called AdAmmine as a means to store ammonia at low pressure, mainly for use in NO_{x} emission reduction in vehicles with diesel engines. They claim that their patented material can also be made from some other salts, but they have chosen strontium chloride for mass production. Earlier company research also considered using the stored ammonia as a means to store synthetic ammonia fuel under the trademark HydrAmmine and the press name "hydrogen tablet", however, this aspect has not been commercialized. Their processes and materials are patented. Their early experiments used magnesium chloride (MgCl_{2}).

=== Soil testing ===
Strontium chloride is used with citric acid in soil testing as a universal extractant of plant nutrients.
