= Strontium carbonate =

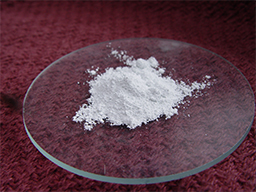

Names
- IUPAC name Strontium carbonate
- Other names Strontianite

Identifiers
CAS Number	1633-05-2
3D model (JSmol)	Interactive image
ChemSpider	14666
ECHA InfoCard	100.015.131
EC Number	216-643-7
PubChem CID	15407
RTECS number	WK8305000
UNII	41YPU4MMCA
CompTox Dashboard (EPA)	DTXSID3029651
- InChI: InChI=1S/CH2O3.Sr/c2-1(3)4;/h(H2,2,3,4);/q;+2/p-2 Key: LEDMRZGFZIAGGB-UHFFFAOYSA-L; InChI=1/CH2O3.Sr/c2-1(3)4;/h(H2,2,3,4);/q;+2/p-2 Key: LEDMRZGFZIAGGB-NUQVWONBAS
- SMILES: [Sr+2].[O-]C([O-])=O

Properties
Chemical formula	SrCO_{3}
Molar mass	147.63 g·mol^{−1}
Appearance	White powder
Odor	Odorless
Density	3.5 g/cm^{3}
Melting point	1,494 °C (2,721 °F; 1,767 K) (decomposes)
Solubility in water	1.1 mg/100mL (18 °C (64 °F; 291 K)); 3.4 mg/100mL (20 °C (68 °F; 293 K)); 65 mg/100mL (100 °C (212 °F; 373 K))
Solubility product (K_{sp})	5.6×10^{−10}
Solubility in ammonia	Slightly soluble
Magnetic susceptibility (χ)	47.0×10^{−6} cm^{3}/mol
Refractive index (n_{D})	1.518

Structure
Crystal structure	Rhombic

Hazards
NFPA 704 (fire diamond)	1 0 0
Flash point	Non-flammable
Safety data sheet (SDS)	External MSDS data

Related compounds
Other anions	Strontium nitrate; Strontium perchlorate; Strontium sulfate
Other cations	Beryllium carbonate; Magnesium carbonate; Calcium carbonate; Barium carbonate; Radium carbonate
- Except where otherwise noted, data are given for materials in their standard state (at 25 °C [77 °F], 100 kPa). verify (what is ?) Infobox references

Strontium carbonate (SrCO_{3}) is the carbonate salt of strontium that has the appearance of a white or grey powder. It occurs in nature as the mineral strontianite.

== Chemical properties ==
Strontium carbonate is a white, odorless, tasteless powder. Being a carbonate, it is a weak base and therefore is reactive with acids. It is otherwise stable and safe to work with. It is practically insoluble in water (0.1 mg/100mL). The solubility is increased significantly if the water is saturated with carbon dioxide, to 100 mg/100mL.

== Preparation ==
Other than the natural occurrence as a mineral, strontium carbonate is prepared synthetically in one of two processes, both of which start with naturally occurring celestine, a mineral form of strontium sulfate (SrSO_{4}). In the "black ash" process, celesite is roasted with coke at 1,100–1,300 °C (2,010–2,370 °F) to form strontium sulfide. The sulfate is reduced, leaving the sulfide:

SrSO_{4} + 2 C → SrS + 2 CO_{2}

A mixture of strontium sulfide with either carbon dioxide gas or sodium carbonate then leads to formation of a precipitate of strontium carbonate.

SrS + H_{2}O + CO_{2} → SrCO_{3} + H_{2}S
SrS + Na_{2}CO_{3} → SrCO_{3} + Na_{2}S

In the "direct conversion" or double-decomposition method, a mixture of celesite and sodium carbonate is treated with steam to form strontium carbonate with substantial amounts of undissolved other solids. This material is mixed with hydrochloric acid, which dissolves the strontium carbonate to form a solution of strontium chloride. Carbon dioxide or sodium carbonate is then used to re-precipitate strontium carbonate, as in the black-ash process.

== Uses ==
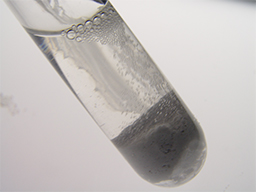
Nitric acid reacts with strontium carbonate to form strontium nitrate.

The most common use is as an inexpensive colorant in fireworks. Strontium and its salts emit a brilliant red color in flame. Unlike other strontium salts, the carbonate salt is generally preferred because of its cost and the fact that it is not hygroscopic. Its ability to neutralize acid is also very helpful in pyrotechnics. Another similar application is in road flares.

Strontium carbonate is used for electronic applications. It is used for manufacturing color television receivers to absorb electrons resulting from the cathode.

It is used in the preparation of iridescent glass, luminous paint, strontium oxide, and strontium salts and in refining sugar and certain drugs.

It is widely used in the ceramics industry as an ingredient in glazes. It acts as a flux and also modifies the color of certain metallic oxides. It has some properties similar to barium carbonate.

It is also used in the manufacturing of strontium ferrites for permanent magnets which are used in loudspeakers and door magnets.

Strontium carbonate is also used for making some superconductors such as BSCCO and also for electroluminescent materials where it is first calcined into SrO and then mixed with sulfur to make SrS:x where x is typically europium. This is the "blue/green" phosphor which is sensitive to frequency and changes from lime green to blue.Other dopants can also be used such as gallium, or yttrium to get a yellow/orange glow instead.

Because of its status as a weak Lewis base, strontium carbonate can be used to produce many different strontium compounds by simple use of the corresponding acid.

== Microbial precipitation ==
The cyanobacteria Calothrix, Synechococcus and Gloeocapsa can precipitate strontian calcite in groundwater. The strontium exists as strontianite in solid solution within the host calcite with the strontium content of up to one percent.
