= Strontium nitrate =

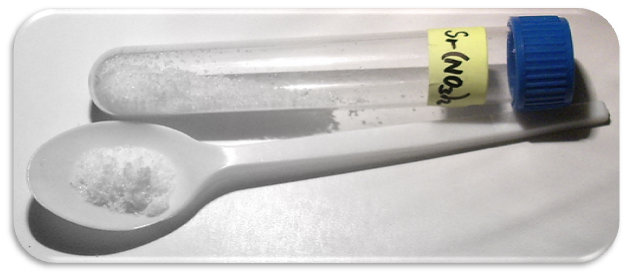

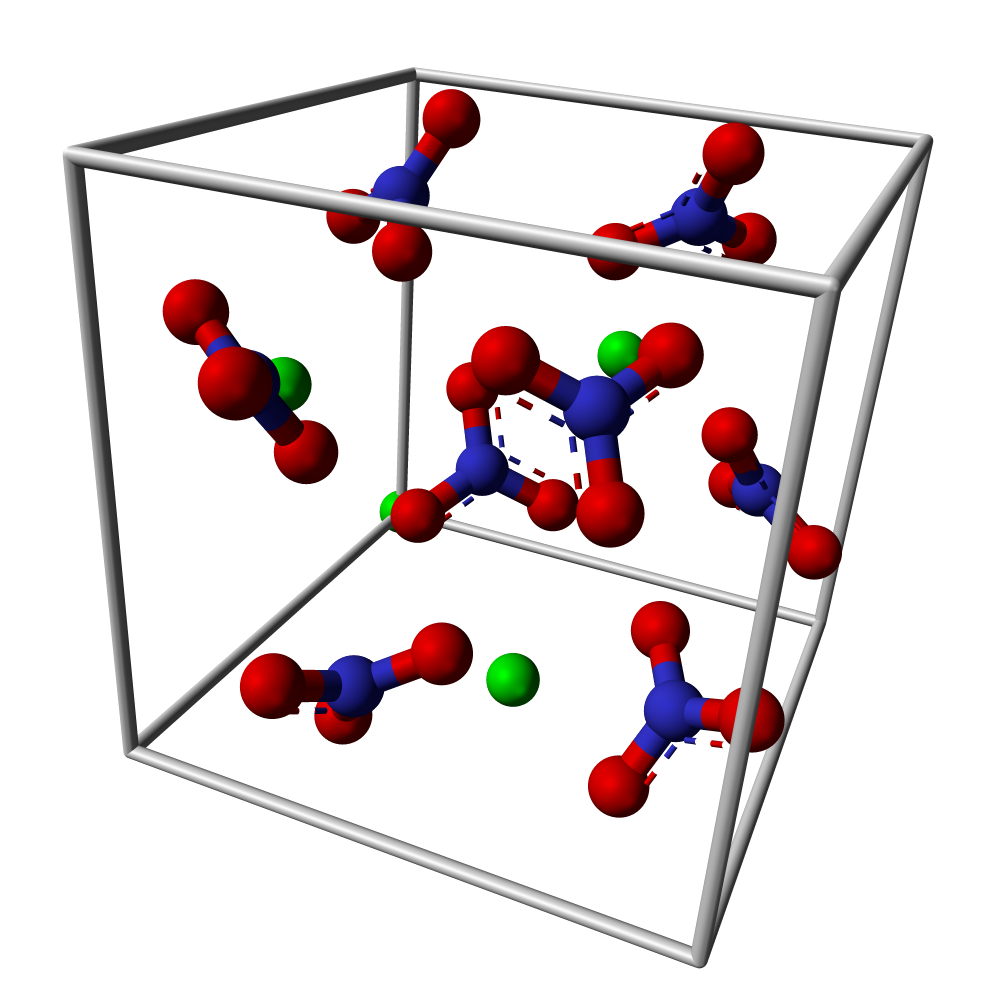

Names
- IUPAC name Strontium nitrate

Identifiers
CAS Number	10042-76-9
3D model (JSmol)	Interactive image
ChemSpider	23231
ECHA InfoCard	100.030.107
EC Number	233-131-9
PubChem CID	24848
UNII	BDG873AQZL
CompTox Dashboard (EPA)	DTXSID9064924
- InChI: InChI=1S/2NO3.Sr/c2*2-1(3)4;/q2*-1;+2 Key: DHEQXMRUPNDRPG-UHFFFAOYSA-N; InChI=1/2NO3.Sr/c2*2-1(3)4;/q2*-1;+2 Key: DHEQXMRUPNDRPG-UHFFFAOYAG
- SMILES: [Sr+2].[O-][N+]([O-])=O.[O-][N+]([O-])=O

Properties
Chemical formula	Sr(NO_{3})_{2}
Molar mass	211.630 g/mol (anhydrous); 283.69 g/mol (tetrahydrate)
Appearance	white crystalline solid
Density	2.986 g/cm^{3} (anhydrous); 2.20 g/cm^{3} (tetrahydrate)
Melting point	570 °C (1,058 °F; 843 K) (anhydrous); 100 °C (212 °F; 373 K), decomposes (tetrahydrate)
Boiling point	645 °C (1,193 °F; 918 K) decomposes
Solubility in water	anhydrous: 660–709 g/L (20 °C (68 °F; 293 K)); tetrahydrate: 604.3 g/L (0 °C (32 °F; 273 K)); 2065 g/L (100 °C (212 °F; 373 K))
Solubility in ammonia	soluble
Solubility in ethanol	slightly soluble
Solubility in acetone	slightly soluble
log P	0.19
Band gap	3.71 eV
Magnetic susceptibility (χ)	57.2×10^{−6} cm^{3}/mol

Structure (anhydrous)
Crystal structure	Cubic
Space group	Pa3̅
Point group	m3̅
Lattice constant	a = 7.76 Å, b = 7.76 Å, c = 7.76 Å α = 90°, β = 90°, γ = 90°
Lattice volume (V)	466.47 Å^{3}
Formula units (Z)	4

Structure (tetrahydrate)
Crystal structure	Monoclinic

Thermochemistry (anhydrous)
Heat capacity (C)	149.9 J⋅mol^{−1}·K^{-1}
Std molar entropy (S^{⦵}_{298})	194.6 J⋅mol^{−1}·K^{-1}
Std enthalpy of formation (Δ_{f}H^{⦵}_{298})	−978.2 kJ⋅mol^{−1}
Gibbs free energy (Δ_{f}G^{⦵})	−780.0 kJ⋅mol^{−1}
Enthalpy of fusion (Δ_{f}H^{⦵}_{fus})	44.6 kJ⋅mol^{−1}

Hazards
- GHS labelling
Pictograms	(GHS03: Oxidizing) (GHS05: Corrosive)
Signal word	Danger
Hazard statements	H271, H318, H402
Precautionary statements	P210, P220, P221, P273, P280, P283, P305+P351+P338+P310, P306+P360, P370+P378, P371+P380+P375, P501
NFPA 704 (fire diamond)	2 0 2 OX
- Lethal dose or concentration (LD, LC)
LD_{50} (median dose)	2750 mg/kg (rat, oral)
LC_{50} (median concentration)	>4.5 mg/L (rat, 4h, inhalation)

Related compounds
Other anions	Strontium carbonate; Strontium chloride; Strontium sulfate
Other cations	Beryllium nitrate; Magnesium nitrate; Calcium nitrate; Barium nitrate
- Except where otherwise noted, data are given for materials in their standard state (at 25 °C [77 °F], 100 kPa). verify (what is ?) Infobox references

Strontium nitrate is an inorganic compound composed of the elements strontium, nitrogen and oxygen with the formula Sr(NO_{3})_{2}. This colorless solid is used as a red colorant and oxidizer in pyrotechnics.

== Preparation ==
Strontium nitrate is typically generated by the reaction of nitric acid with strontium carbonate.

2 HNO_{3} + SrCO_{3} → Sr(NO_{3})_{2} + H_{2}O + CO_{2}

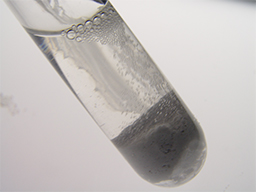
The reaction of nitric acid and strontium carbonate to form strontium nitrate

== Uses ==
=== Pyrotechnics ===
Like many other strontium salts, strontium nitrate is used to produce a rich red flame in fireworks and road flares. Unlike most other commonly used color-producing compounds, (Note: See copper in particular, which can produce any of red, green, or blue / blue-violet depending on the active emitter in a flame.) strontium emits light in almost the same range from their hydroxides and oxides as their chlorides, with the chlorides emitting a slightly deeper red. Oxidizers break down into their oxides and hydroxides upon combustion of a pyrotechnic mixture, generally speaking. Combined with strontium nitrate's high strength as an oxidizer, extremely pure colors in the orange-red to red color range are attainable with simple compositions using it as both oxidizer and colorant and without chlorine donors.

=== Experimental medicine ===
Strontium nitrate can aid in eliminating and lessening skin irritations. When mixed with glycolic acid, strontium nitrate reduces the sensation of skin irritation significantly better than using glycolic acid alone.

== Biochemistry ==
As a divalent ion with an ionic radius similar to that of Ca^{2+} (1.13 and 0.99 Å respectively), Sr^{2+} ions mimic calcium's ability to traverse calcium-selective ion channels and trigger neurotransmitter release from nerve endings. It is thus used in electrophysiology experiments.
