= Glossary of chemical formulae =

This is a list of common chemical compounds with chemical formulae and CAS numbers, indexed by formula. This complements alternative listing at list of inorganic compounds.

== A ==
Chemical formula	Synonyms	CAS number
Ac_{2}O_{3}	actinium(III) oxide	12002–61–8
AgBF_{4}	silver tetrafluoroborate	14104–20–2
AgBr	silver bromide	7785–23–1
AgBrO	silver hypobromite	475461–55–3
AgBrO_{2}	silver bromite	
AgBrO_{3}	silver bromate	7783–89–3
AgBrO_{4}	silver perbromate	
AgCl	silver chloride	7783–90–6
AgCl_{3}Cu_{2}	dicopper silver trichloride	69569–03–5
AgClO_{3}	silver chlorate	7783–92–8
AgClO_{4}	silver perchlorate	7783–93–9
AgCN	silver cyanide	506–64–9
AgCNO	silver fulminate	5610–59–3
AgF	silver fluoride	7775–41–9
AgF_{2}	silver(II) fluoride	7783–95–1
AgI	silver iodide	7783–96–2
AgIO	silver hypoiodite	
AgIO_{2}	silver iodite	
AgIO_{3}	silver iodate	7783–97–3
AgIO_{4}	silver periodate	
AgMnO_{4}	silver permanganate	7783–98–4
AgN_{3}	silver azide	13863–88–2
AgNO_{3}	silver nitrate	7761–88–8
AgO	silver monoxide	1301–96–8
AgONC	silver cyanate	3315–16–0
AgPF_{6}	silver hexafluorophosphate	26042–63–7
AgSNC	silver thiocyanate	1701–93–5
Ag_{2}C_{2}	silver acetylide	7659–31–6
Ag_{2}CO_{3}	silver(I) carbonate	534–16–7
Ag_{2}C_{2}O_{4}	silver oxalate	533–51–7
Ag_{2}Cl_{2}	silver(II) dichloride	75763–82–5
Ag_{2}CrO_{4}	silver chromate	7784–01–2
Ag_{2}Cr_{2}O_{7}	silver dichromate	7784–02–3
Ag_{2}F	silver subfluoride	1302–01–8
Ag_{2}MoO_{4}	silver molybdate	13765–74–7
Ag_{2}O	silver(I) oxide	20667–12–3
Ag_{2}S	silver sulfide	21548–73–2
Ag_{2}SO_{4}	silver sulfate	10294–26–5
Ag_{2}Se	silver selenide	1302–09–6
Ag_{2}SeO_{3}	silver selenite	7784–05–6
Ag_{2}SeO_{4}	silver selenate	7784–07–8
Ag_{2}Te	silver(I) telluride	12002–99–2
Ag_{3}Br_{2}	silver dibromide	11078–32–3
Ag_{3}Br_{3}	silver tribromide	11078–33–4
Ag_{3}Cl_{3}	silver(III) trichloride	12444–96–1
Ag_{3}I_{3}	silver(III) triiodide	37375–12–5
Ag_{3}PO_{4}	silver phosphate	7784–09–0
AlBO_{3}	aluminium borate	61279–70–7
AlBr	aluminium monobromide	22359–97–3
AlBr_{3}	aluminium tribromide	7727–15–3
AlCl	aluminium monochloride	13595–81–8
AlClF	aluminium chloride fluoride	22395–91–1
AlClO	aluminium chloride oxide	13596–11–7
AlCl_{2}H	dichloroalumane	16603–84–2
AlCl_{2}F	aluminium chloride fluoride	13497–96–6
AlCl_{3}	aluminium trichloride	7446–70–0
AlCl_{4}Cs	aluminium caesium tetrachloride	17992–03–9
AlCl_{4}K	potassium tetrachloroaluminate	13821–13–1
AlCl_{4}Na	sodium tetrachloroaluminate	7784–16–9
AlCl_{4}Rb	rubidium tetrachloroaluminate	17992–02–8
AlCl_{6}K_{3}	potassium hexachloroaluminate	13782–08–6
AlCl_{6}Na_{3}	sodium hexachloroaluminate	60172–46–5
AlCo	alumanylidynecobalt	
AlF	aluminium monofluoride	13595–82–9
AlFO	aluminium monofluoride monoxide	13596–12–8
AlF_{2}	aluminium difluoride	13569–23–8
AlF_{2}O	aluminium difluoride oxide	38344–66–0
AlF_{3}	aluminium trifluoride	7784–18–1
AlF_{4}K	potassium tetrafluoroaluminate	14484–69–6
AlF_{4}Li	lithium tetrafluoroaluminate	15138–76–8
AlF_{6}K_{3}	potassium hexafluoraluminate	13775–52–5
AlF_{6}Li_{3}	lithium hexafluoroaluminate	13821–20–0
AlF_{6}Na_{3}	cryolite	15096–52–3
AlGaInP	aluminium-gallium-indium phosphide	
AlH_{3}	aluminium hydride	7784–21–6
AlH_{4}^{−}	alumanuide ion	
Al(OH)_{3}	aluminium hydroxide	21645–51–2
AlI	aluminium monoiodide	29977–41–1
AlI_{3}	aluminium triiodide	7784–23–8
AlLiO_{2}	lithium aluminate	12003–67–7
AlN	aluminium nitride	24304–00–5
Al(NO_{2})_{3}	aluminium nitrite	
Al(NO_{3})_{3}	aluminium nitrate	13473–90–0
AlNaO_{2}	sodium aluminate	1302–42–7
AlO	aluminium monoxide	14457–64–8
AlOSi	aluminium silicon monoxide	37361–47–0
AlO_{2}	aluminium(IV) oxide	11092–32–3
AlP	aluminium monophosphide	20859–73–8
AlPO_{4}	aluminium phosphate	7784–30–7
AlTe	aluminium monotelluride	23330–86–1
AlTe_{2}	monoaluminium ditelluride	39297–18–2
Al_{2}BeO_{4}	beryllium aluminium oxide	12004–06–7
Al_{2}Br_{6}	dialuminium hexabromide	18898–34–5
Al_{2}(CO_{3})_{3}	aluminium carbonate	14455–29–9
Al_{2}Cl_{9}K_{3}	potassium aluminium chloride	74978–20–4
Al_{2}CoO_{4}	cobalt blue	1333–88–6
Al_{2}F_{6}	aluminium fluoride	17949–86–9
Al_{2}I_{6}	aluminium iodide	18898–35–6
Al_{2}MgO_{4}	magnesium aluminium oxide	12068–51–8
Al_{2}O	dialuminium monoxide	12004–36–3
Al_{2}O_{2}	dialuminium dioxide	12252–63–0
Al_{2}O_{3}	aluminium oxide	1344–28–1
Al_{2}O_{5}Si	aluminium silicate	1302–76–7
Al_{2}SiO_{5}	andalusite	12183–80–1
Al_{2}O_{7}Si_{2}	metakaolinite	1332–58–7
Al_{2}S	dialuminium monosulfide	12004–45–4
Al_{2}S_{3}	aluminium sulfide	1302–81–4
Al_{2}(SO_{4})_{3}	aluminium sulfate	14455–29–9
Al_{2}Se	dialuminium selenide	12598–14–0
Al_{2}Si_{2}O_{5}(OH)_{4}	kaolin	1332–58–7
Al_{2}Te	dialuminium telluride	12598–16–2
Al_{3}F_{14}Na_{5}	chiolite	1302–84–7
Al_{4}C_{3}	aluminium carbide	1299–86–1
Al_{6}BeO_{10}	beryllium aluminium oxide	12253–74–6
Al_{6}O_{13}Si_{2}	mullite	1302–93–8
ArClF	argon chloride fluoride	53169–15–6
ArClH	argon chloride hydride	163731–17–7
ArFH	argon fluoride hydride	163731–16–6
AsBrO	arsenic oxybromide	82868–10–8
AsBr_{3}	arsenic tribromide	7784–33–0
AsClO	arsenic monoxide monochloride	14525–25–8
AsCl_{3}	arsenic trichloride	7784–34–1
AsCl_{3}O	arsenic oxychloride	60646–36–8
AsCl_{4}F	arsenic tetrachloride fluoride	87198–15–0
AsF_{3}	arsenic trifluoride	7784–35–2
AsF_{5}	arsenic pentafluoride	7784–36–3
AsH_{3}	arsine	7784–42–1
AsI_{3}	arsenic triiodide	7784–45–4
AsO	arsenic monoxide	12005–99–1
AsO_{2}	arsenic dioxide	12255–12–8
AsP	arsenic monophosphide	12255–33–3
AsP_{3}	arsenic triphosphide	12511–95–4
AsTl	thallium arsenide	12006–09–6
As_{2}I_{4}	arsenic diiodide	13770–56–4
As_{2}O_{3}	arsenic trioxide	1327–53–3
As_{2}P_{2}	arsenic diphosphide	12512–03–7
As_{2}O_{5}	arsenic pentoxide	1303–28–2
As_{2}S_{4}	arsenic tetrasulfide	1303–32–8
As_{2}S_{5}	arsenic pentasulfide	1303–34–0
As_{2}Se	arsenic hemiselenide	1303–35–1
As_{2}Se_{3}	arsenic triselenide	1303–36–2
As_{2}Se_{5}	arsenic pentaselenide	1303–37–3
As_{3}O_{4}	arsenic tetraoxide	83527–53–1
As_{3}P	arsenic(III) phosphide	12512–11–7
As_{4}O_{3}	tetraarsenic trioxide	83527–54–2
As_{4}O_{5}	tetraarsenic pentaoxide	83527–55–3
As_{4}S_{3}	dimorphite	12512–13–9
As_{4}S_{4}	realgar	12279–90–2
AuB	Borylgold	
AuBO	gold monoboride monoxide	12588–90–8
AuBr	gold bromide	10294–27–6
AuBr_{3}	gold tribromide	10294–28–7
AuCN	gold cyanide	506–65–0
AuCl	gold chloride	10294–29–8
AuCl_{3}	gold trichloride	13453–07–1
AuF_{3}	gold trifluoride	14720–21–9
AuI	gold iodide	10294–31–2
AuI_{3}	gold(III) iodide	31032–13–0
Au(OH)_{3}	gold hydroxide	1303–52–2
AuTe	gold telluride	37043–71–3
Au_{2}O_{3}	gold trioxide	1303–58–8
Au_{2}S	gold sulfide	1303–60–2
Au_{2}S_{3}	gold trisulfide	1303–61–3
Au_{2}(SeO_{4})_{3}	gold triselenate	10294–32–3
Au_{2}Se_{3}	gold triselenide	1303–62–4

== B ==
Chemical formula	Synonyms	CAS number
BAs	boron arsenide	12005–69–5
BBr_{3}	boron tribromide	10294–33–4
BCl_{3}	boron trichloride	10294–34–5
BF_{3}	boron trifluoride	7637–07–2
BH_{3}	borane	13283-31-3
BH_{4}^{−}	borohydride ion	16971-29-2
BH_{6}N	ammonia borane	13774-81-7
BI_{3}	boron triiodide	13517–10–7
BN	boron nitride	10043–11–5
B(NO_{3})_{3}	boron nitrate	2376148-16-0
B(NO_{3})_{4}^{−}	tetranitratoborate ion	
B(OH)_{3}	boric acid	10043–35–3
BO_{3}^{3−}	orthoborate ion	14213-97-9
BP	boron phosphide	20205–91–8
BPO_{4}	boron phosphate	13308–51–5
B_{2}Cl_{4}	diboron tetrachloride	13701–67–2
B_{2}F_{4}	diboron tetrafluoride	13965–73–6
B_{2}H_{6}	diborane	19287–45–7
B_{2}Mg	magnesium diboride	12007-25-9
B_{2}H_{2}Se_{3}	diboron triselenide	287–91–2
B_{2}O_{3}	diboron trioxide	1303–86–2
B_{2}S_{3}	diboron trisulfide	12007–33–9
B_{3}N_{3}H_{6}	borazine	6569–51–3
B_{4}C	boron carbide	12069–32–8
B_{4}CaO_{7}	colemanite	
B_{4}Na_{2}O_{7}·10H_{2}O	borax	1303-96-4
Ba(AlO_{2})_{2}	barium aluminate	12004–04–5
Ba(AsO_{3})_{2}	barium arsenite	125687–68–5
Ba(AsO_{4})_{2}	barium arsenate	56997–31–0
BaB_{6}	barium hexaboride	12046–08–1
BaBr_{2}	barium bromide	10553–31–8
Ba(BrO)_{2}	barium hypobromite	
Ba(BrO_{2})_{2}	barium bromite	
Ba(BrO_{3})_{2}	barium bromate	13967–90–3
Ba(BrO_{3})_{2}·H_{2}O	barium bromate monohydrate	10326–26–8
Ba(BrO_{3})_{2}·2H_{2}O	barium bromate dihydrate	
Ba(BrO_{4})_{2}	barium perbromate	
Ba(BrO_{4})_{2}·3H_{2}O	barium perbromate trihydrate	115873-17-1
Ba(BrO_{4})_{2}·4H_{2}O	barium perbromate tetrahydrate	64504-66-1
Ba(CHO_{2})_{2}	barium formate	541–43–5
Ba(C_{3}H_{3}O_{2})_{2}	barium acetate	543–81–7
Ba(CN)_{2}	barium cyanide	542–62–1
BaHfO_{3}	barium hafnate	151640–29–8
BaHgI_{4}	barium tetraiodomercurate(II)	10048–99–4
Ba(HS)_{2}	barium hydrosulfide	
BaI_{2}	barium iodide	13718–50–8
Ba(IO)_{2}	barium hypoiodite	
Ba(IO_{2})_{2}	barium iodite	
Ba(IO_{3})_{2}	barium iodate	10567–69–8
Ba(IO_{4})_{2}	barium periodate	13718–58–6
BaK_{2}(CrO_{4})_{2}	barium potassium chromate	27133–66–0
BaMnO_{4}	barium manganate	7787–35–1
Ba(MnO_{4})_{2}	barium permanganate	7787–36–2
BaMoO_{4}	barium molybdate	7787–37–3
Ba(N_{3})_{2}	barium azide	18810–58–7
Ba(NO_{2})_{2}	barium nitrite	13465–94–6
Ba(NO_{3})_{2}	barium nitrate	10022–31–8
Ba(NbO_{3})_{2}	barium niobate	12009–14–2
Ba(NbO_{3})_{2}	barium metaniobate	12009–14–2
BaO	barium oxide	1304–28–5
Ba(OH)_{2}	barium hydroxide	17194–00–2
BaO_{2}	barium peroxide	1304–29–6
Ba(PO_{3})_{2}	barium metaphosphate	13466–20–1
BaS	barium sulfide	21109–95–5
Ba(SCN)_{2}	barium thiocyanate	2092–17–3
BaS_{2}O_{3}	barium thiosulfate	35112–53–9
BaSiF_{6}	barium hexafluorosilicate	17125–80–3
BaSO_{3}	barium sulfite	7787–39–5
BaSO_{4}	barium sulfate barite	7787–43–7
BaSe	barium selenide	1304–39–8
Ba(SeCN)_{2}	barium selenocyanate	
BaSeO_{3}	barium selenite	13718–59–7
BaSeO_{4}	barium selenate	7787–41–9
BaSiO_{3}	barium metasilicate	13255–26–0
BaSi_{2}	barium silicide	1304–40–1
BaSi_{2}O_{5}	barium disilicate	12650–28–1
BaSnO_{3}	barium stannate	12009–18–6
BaTeO_{3}	barium tellurite	58440–17–8
BaTeO_{4}·3H_{2}O	barium tellurate trihydrate	28557–54–2
BaTiO_{3}	barium titanate barium metatitanate	12047–27–7
BaU_{2}O_{7}	barium uranium oxide	10380–31–1
BaWO_{4}	barium tungstate	7787–42–0
BaZrO_{3}	barium zirconate	12009–21–1
Ba_{2}Na(NbO_{3})_{5}	barium sodium niobate	12323–03–4
Ba_{2}P_{2}O_{7}	barium pyrophosphate	13466–21–2
Ba_{2}V_{2}O_{7}	barium pyrovanadate	
Ba_{2}XeO_{6}	barium perxenate	
Ba_{3}(CrO_{4})_{2}	barium chromate(V)	12345–14–1
Ba_{3}N_{2}	barium nitride	12047–79–9
Ba_{3}(PO_{4})_{2}	barium orthophosphate	13517–08–3
Ba_{3}(VO_{4})_{2}	barium orthovandate	39416–30–3
BeB_{2}	beryllium boride	12228–40–9
Be(BH_{4})_{2}	beryllium borohydride	17440–85–6
BeBr_{2}	beryllium bromide	7787–46–4
Be(CHO_{2})_{2}	beryllium formate	1111–71–3
BeCO_{3}	beryllium carbonate	13106–47–3
Be(C_{2}H_{3}O_{2})_{2}	beryllium acetate	543–81–7
Be(C_{5}H_{7}O_{2})_{2}	beryllium acetylacetonate	10210–64–7
BeCl_{2}	beryllium chloride	7787–47–5
Be(ClO)_{2}	beryllium hypochlorite	
Be(ClO_{3})_{2}	beryllium chlorate	
Be(ClO_{4})_{2}	beryllium perchlorate	13597–95–0
BeF_{2}	beryllium fluoride	7787–49–7
BeI_{2}	beryllium iodide	7787–53–3
Be(NO_{2})_{2}	beryllium nitrite	
Be(NO_{3})_{2}	beryllium nitrate	7787–55–5
BeO	beryllium oxide bromellite	1304–56–9
Be(OH)_{2}	beryllium hydroxide	13327–32–7
BeS	beryllium sulfide	13598–22–6
BeSO_{3}	beryllium sulfite	
BeSO_{4}	beryllium sulfate	13510–49–1
Be_{2}C	beryllium carbide	506–66–1
Be_{3}Al_{2}(SiO_{3})_{6}	beryl	1302–52–9
Be_{3}N_{2}	beryllium nitride	1304–54–7
BiBO_{3}	bismuth(III) orthoborate	14059–35–9
BiBr_{3}	bismuth(III) bromide	7787–58–8
Bi(C_{2}H_{3}O_{2})_{3}	bismuth(III) acetate	22306–37–2
BiC_{6}H_{5}O_{7}	bismuth(III) citrate	813–93–4
BiCl_{3}	bismuth(III) chloride	7787–60–2
BiF_{3}	bismuth(III) fluoride	7787–61–3
BiI_{3}	bismuth(III) iodide	7787–64–6
Bi(NO_{3})_{3}·5H_{2}O	bismuth(III) nitrate pentahydrate	10035–06–0
BiOCl	bismuth(III) oxychloride	7787–59–9
BiOI	bismuth(III) oxyiodide	7787–63–5
(BiO)_{2}CO_{3}	bismuth oxycarbonate	5892–10–4
BiPO_{4}	bismuth(III) orthophosphate	10049–01–1
Bi(VO_{3})_{5}	bismuth(III) metavanadate	
Bi_{2}Se_{3}	bismuth(III) selenide bismuth selenide	12068–69–8
Bi_{2}(MoO_{4})_{3}	bismuth(III) molybdate	13565–96–3
Bi_{2}O_{3}	bismuth(III) oxide	1304–76–3
Bi_{2}S_{3}	bismuth(III) sulfide bismuthinite	1345–07–9
Bi_{2}Se_{3}	bismuth(III) selenide	12068–69–8
BrCl	bromine chloride	13863–41–7
BrCl_{3}	bromine trichloride	12360-50-8
BrCl_{5}	bromine pentachloride	
BrF	bromine monofluoride bromine fluoride	13863-59-7
BrF_{3}	bromine trifluoride	7787–71–5
BrF_{5}	bromine pentafluoride	7789-30-2
BrI	iodine monobromide	7789-33-5
BrO_{3}^{−}	bromate ion	15541–45–4
Br_{2}	bromine	7726–95–6
Br_{2}O_{5}	dibromine pentoxide	58572–43–3
Br_{3}^{−}	tribromide ion	14522-80-6
Br_{5}^{−}	pentabromide ion	28712-15-4

== C ==
Chemical formula	Synonyms	CAS number
CAgO	carbonylsilver	
CCl_{2}F_{2}	dichlorodifluoromethane freon-12	75–71–8
CCl_{4}	carbon tetrachloride tetrachloromethane	56–23–5
C(CN)_{4}	tetracyanomethane	24331–09–7
CFCl_{3}	trichlorofluoromethane freon-11	75–69–4
CFCl_{2}CF_{2}Cl	chlorotrifluoromethane freon-13	75–72–9
CHCl_{3}	chloroform trichloromethane methyl trichloride	67–66–3
CHClF_{2}	chlorodifluoromethane	75–45–6
CH(CN)_{3}	cyanoform	454–50–2
CHNO	isocyanic acid	
CHN_{3}O_{6}	trinitromethane	517–25–9
CHO_{2}^{−}	formate ion	
CH_{2}	methylene	
CH_{2}Ag	carbene silver	
CH_{2}=CHCH=CH_{2}	1,3-butadiene	106–99–0
CH_{2}==CO	ketene	463–51–4
CH_{2}=CHOH	ethenol	557–75–5
CH_{2}ClCOOH	chloroacetic acid	79–11–8
CH_{2}Cl_{2}	dichloromethane	75–09–2
CH_{2}ClF	chlorofluoromethane	593–70–4
CH_{2}(CN)_{2}	malononitrile	109–77–3
CH_{2}O	formaldehyde	19710–56–6
CH_{2}(OH)_{2}	methanediol	463–57–0
CH_{2}OHCH_{2}OH	ethylene glycol	107–21–1
CH_{3}CCH	propyne	74–99–7
CH_{3}CdCH_{3}	dimethylcadmium	506–82–1
CH_{3}CHCHCH_{3}	2-butene	107–01–7
CH_{3}CHCH_{2}	propene	115–07–1
CH_{3}CHO	acetaldehyde ethanal	75–07–0
CH_{3}CH_{2}Br	bromoethane	74–96–4
CH_{3}CH_{2}CH_{2}CH_{2}OH	butan-1-ol	71–36–3
CH_{3}CH_{2}CH_{2}OH	1-propanol propan-1-ol propyl alcohol	71–23–8
CH_{3}CH_{2}CONH_{2}	propanamide	79–05–0
CH_{3}CH_{2}COOH	propionic acid propanoic aicd	79–09–4
CH_{3}CH_{2}OCH_{2}CH_{3}	diethyl ether ethoxyethane	60–29–7
CH_{3}CH_{2}OH	ethanol ethyl alcohol	64–17–5
CH_{3}(CH_{2})_{16}COOH	stearic acid octadecanoic acid	57–11–4
CH_{3}CN	acetonitrile	75–05–8
CH_{3}COCH_{3}	acetone propanone	67–64–1
CH_{3}COOCH_{3}	methyl acetate methyl ethanoate	79–20–9
CH_{3}COCl	acetyl chloride ethanoyl chloride	75–36–5
CH_{3}CONH_{2}	acetamide ethanamide	60–35–5
CH_{3}COO^{−}	acetate ion ethanoate ion	71–50–1
CH_{3}COOCHCH_{2}	vinyl acetate	108–05–4
CH_{3}COOCH_{2}C_{6}H_{5}	benzyl acetate	140–11–4
CH_{3}COO(CH_{2})_{2}CH(CH_{3})_{2}	isoamyl acetate (3-methyl)butyl ethanoate	123–92–2
CH_{3}COOH	acetic acid ethanoic acid	64–19–7
CH_{3}COONa	sodium acetate	127–09–3
CH_{3}COOK	potassium acetate	127–08–2
CH_{3}COORb	rubidium acetate	563–67–7
CH_{3}COOCs	caesium acetate	3396–11–0
(CH_{3}CO)_{2}O	acetic anhydride	108–24–7
CH_{3}Cl	chloromethane methyl chloride	74–87–3
CH_{3}HgCH_{3}	dimethylmercury	593–74–8
CH_{3}I	iodomethane methyl iodide	74–88–4
CH_{3}OCH_{3}	dimethyl ether	115–10–6
CH_{3}NH_{2}	methylamine	74-89-5
CH_{3}NO	oxaziridine	6827-26-5
CH_{3}OCs	caesium methoxide	
CH_{3}OH	methanol	67–56–1
CH_{3}OK	potassium methoxide	865–33–8
CH_{3}OLi	lithium methoxide	865–34–9
CH_{3}ONa	sodium methoxide	124–41–4
CH_{3}ORb	rubidium methoxide	
CH_{3}SCH_{3}	dimethyl sulfide DMS	75–18–3
CH_{3}SH	methanethiol	74–93–1
(CH_{3})_{2}CHOH	isopropyl alcohol 2-propanol propan-2-ol isopropanol	67–63–0
(CH_{3})_{2}CO	acetone propanone	67–64–1
(CH_{3})_{2}C_{2}O_{4}	dimethyl oxalate	553–90–2
(CH_{3})_{2}NNH_{2}	dimethyl hydrazine	30260–66–3
(CH_{3})_{2}NH	dimethylamine N-methylmethanamine	124-40-3
(CH_{3})_{2}S^{+}CH_{2}CH_{2}COO^{−}	dimethylsulfoniopropionate DMSP	7314–30–9
(CH_{3})_{3}CCl	t-butyl chloride	507–20–0
(CH_{3})_{3}COH	t-butyl alcohol	75–65–0
(CH_{3})_{3}COOC(CH_{3})_{3}	di-t-butyl peroxide DTBP	110–05–4
(CH_{3})_{3}N	trimethylamine	75-50-3
CH_{4}	methane natural gas	74–82–8
CH_{4}N_{2}O_{2}	hydroxycarbamide	127–07–1
CH_{5}N_{3}	Guanidine	113-00-8
CN^{−}	cyanide ion	57–12–5
(CN)_{2}	cyanogen	460–19–5
C(NH_{2})_{3}NO_{3}	guanidine nitrate	506–93–4
CNO^{−}	cyanate ion	661–20–1
CO	carbon monoxide	630–08–0
COCl_{2}	phosgene	75–44–5
CO_{2}	carbon dioxide	124–38–9
CO_{3}	carbon trioxide	12144–05–7
CO_{3}^{2−}	carbonate ion	3812–32–6
CS_{2}	carbon disulfide	75–15–0
C_{2}F_{4}	tetrafluoroethylene	116–14–3
C_{2}H_{2}	acetylene	74–86–2
C_{2}H_{2}O_{2}	glyoxal	107-22-2
C_{2}H_{3}Cl	vinyl chloride	75–01–4
C_{2}H_{3}NO	glycolonitrile	107–16–4
C_{2}H_{3}O_{2}^{−}	acetate ion	71–50–1
C_{2}H_{4}	ethylene	74–85–1
C_{2}H_{4}Cl_{2}	ethylene dichloride	107–06–2
C_{2}H_{4}N_{4}	3-amino-1,2,4-triazole	61–82–5
C_{2}H_{4}O	ethylene oxide	75-21-8
C_{2}H_{4}O_{2}	acetic acid	64–19–7
C_{2}H_{5}Br	bromoethane	74–96–4
C_{2}H_{5}NH_{2}	ethylamine	75–04–7
C_{2}H_{5}NO_{2}	glycine Gly	56–40–6
C_{2}H_{5}O^{−}	ethoxide ion	
C_{2}H_{5}OH	ethanol ethyl alcohol	64–17–5
(C_{2}H_{5})_{2}NH	diethylamine	109–89–7
C_{2}H_{5}OCs	caesium ethoxide	
C_{2}H_{5}OK	potassium ethoxide	917–58–8
C_{2}H_{5}ONa	sodium ethoxide	141–52–6
C_{2}H_{5}ORb	rubidium ethoxide	
C_{2}H_{6}	ethane	74–84–0
C_{2}H_{6}OS	dimethyl sulfoxide DMSO	67–68–5
C_{2}H_{7}NO	ethanolamine	141-43-5
C_{2}H_{7}NO_{2}	ammonium acetate	631-61-8
C_{2}H_{7}NO_{3}S	taurine	107–35–7
C_{2}O_{4}^{2−}	oxalate ion	
CH_{3}ClO_{4}	Methyl perchlorate	17043-56-0
C_{3}H_{3}Cl_{3}	1,1,3-Trichloropropene	2567–14–8
C_{3}H_{3}O_{4}^{−}	malonate ion	156–80–9
C_{3}HN	cyanopolyyne	
C_{3}H_{3}N	azete	287-24-1
C_{3}H_{4}	Propadiene	463–49–0
C_{3}H_{4}N_{2}	imidazole	288–32–4
C_{3}H_{4}N_{2}S	aminothiazole	96–50–4
C_{3}H_{4}O_{3}	pyruvic acid	127–17–3
C_{3}H_{4}O_{4}	malonic acid	141–82–2
C_{3}H_{5}NO	acrylamide	79-06-1
C_{3}H_{5}N_{3}	3-amino-1H-pyrazole	1820–80–0
C_{3}H_{5}N_{3}O_{9}	nitroglycerine	55–63–0
C_{3}H_{6}	cyclopropane	75–19–4
C_{3}H_{6}	propylene	115–07–1
C_{3}H_{6}O_{2}	ethyl formate	109-94-4
C_{3}H_{6}O_{2}S	2-Mercaptopropionic acid	79-42-5
C_{3}H_{6}O_{2}S	3-Mercaptopropionic acid	107-96-0
C_{3}H_{7}N	azetidine	503-29-7
C_{3}H_{7}N_{3}	n-Propyl azide	22293-25-0
C_{3}H_{7}NO_{2}	α-alanine	56–41–7
C_{3}H_{7}NO_{2}	β-alanine	107–95–9
C_{3}H_{7}NO_{2}S	cysteine Cys	52–90–4
C_{3}H_{7}NO_{3}	serine Ser	56–45–1
C_{3}H_{7}P	Phosphetane	287-26-3
C_{3}H_{8}	propane	74–98–6
C_{3}H_{8}NO_{5}P	glyphosate	1071-83-6
C_{3}H_{8}O	propanol 1-propanol	71–23–8
C_{3}H_{8}O	2-propanol	67–63–0
C_{3}H_{8}O_{2}	propylene glycol	57-55-6
C_{3}H_{8}O_{2}	1,3-propanediol	504-63-2
C_{3}H_{8}O_{3}	glycerol	56–81–5
C_{3}H_{9}N_{3}	1,3,5-triazinane	
C_{3}N_{3}(OH)_{3}	cyanuric acid	108–80–5
C_{3}N_{12}	cyanuric triazide	5637–83–2
C_{4}HCl_{2}FN_{2}	2,6-dichloro-5-fluoroacil	2927–71–1
C_{4}H_{2}	diacetylene	460-12-8
C_{4}I_{2}	diiodobutadiyne	53214-97-4
C_{4}H_{2}BrClN_{2}	5-bromo-2-chloropyrimidine	32779–36–5
C_{4}H_{2}Cl_{2}N_{2}	2,4-dichloropyrimidine	3934–20–1
C_{4}H_{2}Cl_{2}N_{2}	4,6-dichloropyrimidine	1193–21–1
C_{4}H_{3}Cl_{2}N_{3}	2-amino-4,6-dichloropyrimidine	56–05–3
C_{4}H_{3}FN_{2}O_{2}	fluorouracil	51–21–8
C_{4}H_{4}	vinylacetylene	
C_{4}H_{4}FN_{3}O	flucytosine	2022–85–7
C_{4}H_{4}N_{2}O_{2}	uracil	66–22–8
C_{4}H_{4}N_{4}	diaminomaleonitrile	
C_{4}H_{4}N_{4}	3-aminopyrazole-4-carbonitrile	16617–46–2
C_{4}H_{4}N_{4}	1,3,5,7-tetrazocine	
C_{4}H_{4}O	furan	110–00–09
C_{4}H_{5}FO_{2}	Methyl 2-fluoroacrylate	2343-89-7
C_{4}H_{5}N_{3}O	cytosine	71–30–7
C_{4}H_{6}N_{2}	fomepizole	
C_{4}H_{6}N_{2}	1-methylimidazole	
C_{4}H_{6}N_{2}	4-methylimidazole	
C_{4}H_{6}N_{2}S	methimazole	60–56–0
C_{4}H_{6}N_{2}S	2-amino-4-methylthiazole	1603–91–4
C_{4}H_{6}N_{4}O	2,4-diamino-6-hydroxypyrimidine	56–06–4
C_{4}H_{6}O_{2}	1,4-Butynediol	
C_{4}H_{6}O_{2}	gamma-Butyrolactone	
C_{4}H_{6}O_{2}	crotonic acid	3724–65–0
C_{4}H_{6}O_{2}	diacetyl	
C_{4}H_{2}O_{2}	diepoxybutane	
C_{4}H_{6}O_{2}	1,4-Dioxene	
C_{4}H_{6}O_{2}	isocrotonic acid	
C_{4}H_{6}O_{2}	methacrylic acid	79–41–4
C_{4}H_{6}O_{2}	methyl acrylate	
C_{4}H_{6}O_{2}	succinaldehyde	
C_{4}H_{6}O_{2}	vinyl acetate	
C_{4}H_{6}O_{3}	propylene carbonate	
C_{4}H_{6}O_{4}	succinic acid	110–15–6
C_{4}H_{7}BrO_{2}	2-bromobutyric acid	80–58–0
C_{4}H_{7}BrO_{2}	4-bromobutyric acid	2623–87–2
C_{4}H_{7}BrO_{2}	α-bromoisobutyric acid	2052–01–9
C_{4}H_{7}BrO_{2}	ethyl bromoacetate	105–36–2
C_{4}H_{73}	potassium oxybate	
C_{4}H_{7}NaO_{3}	sodium oxybate	
(C_{4}H_{7}NO)_{n}	Poly(N-vinylacetamide)	
C_{4}H_{7}NO_{2}	1-aminocyclopropanecarboxylic acid	22059–21–8
C_{4}H_{7}NO_{3}	aceturic acid	
C_{4}H_{7}NO_{4}	aspartic acid Asp	56–84–8
C_{4}H_{8}	cyclobutane	287–23–0
C_{4}H_{8}N_{2}O_{3}	asparagine Asn	70–47–3
C_{4}H_{8}O	tetrahydrofuran THF	109–99–9
C_{4}H_{8}O_{2}	ethyl acetate ethyl ethanoate	
C_{4}H_{8}O_{3}	gamma-hydroxybutyric acid	591-81-1
C_{4}H_{9}ClHg	n-Butylmercuric chloride	543-63-5
C_{4}H_{9}Li	n-butyllithium	
C_{4}H_{9}NO_{2}	γ-aminobutyric acid	56–12–2
C_{4}H_{9}NO_{3}	threonine Thr	72–19–5
C_{4}H_{9}Na	n-Butylsodium	
C_{4}H_{9}OH	butyl alcohol	71–36–3
C_{4}H_{10}	butane	106–97–8
C_{4}H_{10}	2-methylpropane	75–28–5
C_{4}H_{10}O	diethyl ether	60–29–7
C_{4}H_{10}O_{2}	1,2-butanediol	
C_{4}H_{10}O_{2}	1,3-butanediol	
C_{4}H_{10}O_{2}	1,4-butanediol	
C_{4}H_{10}O_{2}	2,3-butanediol	
C_{4}H_{10}O_{2}	tert-butyl hydroperoxide	
C_{4}H_{10}O_{2}	dimethoxyethane	
C_{4}H_{10}O_{2}	2-ethoxyethanol	
C_{4}H_{10}O_{2}	1-methoxy-2-propanol	
C_{4}H_{10}O_{3}	diethylene glycol	111–46–6
C_{4}H_{11}NO_{2}	diethanolamine	111–42–2
C_{5}H_{3}BrN_{2}O_{2}	2-bromo-5-nitropyridine	4487–59–6
C_{5}H_{3}Br_{2}N	3,5-dibromopyridine	625–92–3
C_{5}H_{3}ClN_{2}O_{2}	2-chloro-5-nitropyridine	4585–45–2
C_{5}H_{3}ClN_{4}	6-chloropurine	87–42–3
C_{5}H_{4}NCOOH	niacin	59–67–6
C_{5}H_{4}N_{2}O_{2}	pyrazinoic acid	98–97–5
C_{5}H_{4}N_{2}O_{4}	orotic acid	65–86–1
C_{5}H_{4}N_{4}O	allopurinol	315–30–0
C_{5}H_{4}N_{4}O	hypoxanthine	68–94–0
C_{5}H_{4}N_{4}O_{2}	xanthine	69–89–6
C_{5}H_{4}N_{4}S	mercaptopurine	50–44–2
C_{5}H_{4}O	cyclopentadienone	
C_{5}H_{4}O_{2}	furfural	
C_{5}H_{4}O_{2}S	b-thiophenic acid	88–13–1
C_{5}H_{5}^{−}	cyclopentadienyl anion	
C_{5}H_{5}BrN_{2}	2-amino-5-bromopyridine	1072–97–5
C_{5}H_{5}ClN_{2}	2-amino-4-chloropyridine	19798–80–2
C_{5}H_{5}ClN_{2}	2-amino-5-chloropyridine	1072–98–6
C_{5}H_{5}ClN_{2}	4-amino-2-chloropyridine	14432–12–3
C_{5}H_{5}IN_{2}	2-amino-5-iodopyridine	20511–12–0
C_{5}H_{5}N	pyridine	110–86–1
C_{5}H_{5}NO	2-pyridone	142–08–5
C_{5}H_{5}NO	3-pyridinol	109–00–2
C_{5}H_{5}N_{3}O	pyrazinamide	98–96–4
C_{5}H_{5}N_{3}O_{2}	2-amino-nitropyridine	4214–76–0
C_{5}H_{5}N_{5}	adenine	73–24–5
C_{5}H_{5}N_{5}O	guanine	73–40–5
C_{5}H_{6}BNO_{2}	3-pyridinylboronic acid	1692–25–7
C_{5}H_{6}N_{2}	1,2-diazepine	
C_{5}H_{6}N_{2}	1,3-diazepine	
C_{5}H_{6}N_{2}	1,4-diazepine	
C_{5}H_{6}N_{2}	1-vinylimidazole	
C_{5}H_{6}N_{2}	2-aminopyridine	504–29–0
C_{5}H_{6}N_{2}	3-aminopyridine	
C_{5}H_{6}N_{2}	4-aminopyridine	504–24–5
C_{5}H_{6}N_{2}	glutaronitrile	
C_{5}H_{6}N_{2}OS	methylthiouracil	56–04–2
C_{5}H_{6}N_{2}O_{2}	thymine	65–71–4
C_{5}H_{6}O	cyclopentenone	
C_{5}H_{6}O_{5}	α-ketoglutaric acid	328–50–7
C_{5}H_{7}N_{3}	3,4-diaminopyridine	54–96–6
C_{5}H_{8}O_{2}	gamma-valerolactone	
C_{5}H_{9}NO	3-dimethylaminoacrolein	927-63-9
C_{5}H_{9}NO_{2}	allylglycine	
C_{5}H_{9}NO_{2}	proline Pro	147–85–3
C_{5}H_{9}NO_{4}	glutamic acid Glu	56–86–0
C_{5}H_{10}	cyclopentane	287–92–3
C_{5}H_{10}N_{2}O_{3}	glutamine Gln	56–85–9
C_{5}H_{10}O_{2}	pivalic acid	
C_{5}H_{10}O_{2}	valeric acid	
C_{5}H_{10}O_{2}	3-methylbutanoic acid	
C_{5}H_{10}O_{4}	deoxyribose	533–67–5
C_{5}H_{11}NO_{2}	valine Val	660–88–8
C_{5}H_{11}NO_{2}S	methionine Met	25343–91–3
C_{5}H_{12}	pentane	109–66–0
C_{5}H_{12}O_{2}	neopentyl glycol	101-38-2
C_{5}H_{12}O_{4}	pentaerythritol	115–77–5
C_{5}H_{12}O_{5}	xylitol	87–99–0
C_{5}H_{13}N	N,N-diethylmethylamine	616-39-7
C_{6}F_{5}COOH	pentafluorobenzoic acid	602–94–8
C_{6}H_{2}Cl_{3}NO	2,6-Dichloroquinone-4-chloroimide; Gibbs reagent	
C_{6}H_{3}Br_{3}O	2,4,6-Tribromophenol	
C_{6}H_{3}Cl_{3}O	2,4,6-Trichlorophenol	
C_{6}H_{4}BrNO_{2}	5-bromonicotinic acid	20826–04–4
C_{6}H_{4}ClNO_{2}	2-chloronicotinic acid	2942–59–8
C_{6}H_{4}ClN_{3}	4-Chlorophenyl azide	
C_{6}H_{4}ClNO_{2}	6-chloro-2-pyridinecarboxylic acid	4684–94–0
C_{6}H_{4}ClNO_{2}	6-chloronicotinic acid	5326–23–8
C_{6}H_{4}N_{4}	tricyanoaminopropene	
C_{6}H_{4}O_{2}	orthobenzoquinone	583–63–1
C_{6}H_{4}O_{2}	parabenzoquinone quinone	106–51–4
C_{6}H_{5}Br	bromobenzene	108–86–1
C_{6}H_{5}CHO	benzaldehyde	100–52–7
C_{6}H_{5}CH_{2}OH	benzyl alcohol	100–51–6
C_{6}H_{5}Cl	chlorobenzene	108–90–7
C_{6}H_{5}COCl	benzoyl chloride	98–88–4
C_{6}H_{5}COO^{−}	benzoate ion	766–76–7
C_{6}H_{5}COOH	benzoic acid	65–85–0
C_{6}H_{5}F	fluorobenzene	462–06–6
C_{6}H_{5}I	iodobenzene	591–50–4
C_{6}H_{5}NO_{2}	picolinic acid	98–98–6
C_{6}H_{5}NO_{3}	4-nitrophenol	100–02–7
C_{6}H_{5}NO_{3}	6-hydroxyniacin	5006–66–6
C_{6}H_{5}OH	phenol	108–95–2
C_{6}H_{5}O_{7}^{3−}	citrate ion	126–44–3
C_{6}H_{5}NO_{4}	Citrazinic acid	99-11-6
(C_{6}H_{5})_{4}Ge	tetraphenylgermane	1048–05–1
(C_{6}H_{5})_{2}O	diphenyl ether	101–84–8
(C_{6}H_{5})_{3}N	triphenylamine	603–34–9
(C_{6}H_{5})_{3}P	triphenylphosphine	603–35–0
C_{6}H_{6}	benzene	71–43–2
C_{6}H_{6}BClO_{2}	4-chlorophenylboronic acid	1679–18–1
C_{6}H_{6}BFO_{2}	4-fluorophenylboronic acid	1765–93–1
C_{6}H_{6}ClN	2-Chloromethylpyridine	4377-33-7
C_{6}H_{6}IN	4-iodoaniline	540–37–4
C_{6}H_{6}N_{2}O	nicotinamide	98–92–0
C_{6}H_{6}N_{2}O_{2}	6-aminonicotinic acid	3167–49–5
C_{6}H_{6}N_{4}	2,2′,2″-Nitrilotriacetonitrile	7327-60-8
C_{6}H_{6}O	phenol	108–95–2
C_{6}H_{6}O_{2}	catechol	120–80–9
C_{6}H_{6}O_{2}	hydroquinone	123–31–9
C_{6}H_{6}O_{2}	resorcinol	108–46–3
C_{6}H_{6}O_{3}	hydroxymethylfurfural	67–47–0
C_{6}H_{7}BO_{2}	phenylboronic acid	98–80–6
C_{6}H_{7}CsO_{6}	caesium ascorbate	
C_{6}H_{7}KO_{6}	potassium ascorbate	
C_{6}H_{7}KO_{6}	Potassium erythorbate	17175–66–5
C_{6}H_{7}LiO_{6}	lithium ascorbate	
C_{6}H_{7}N_{3}O	isoniazid	54–85–3
C_{6}H_{7}NaO_{6}	sodium ascorbate	
C_{6}H_{7}RbO_{6}	rubidium ascorbate	
C_{6}H_{8}N_{2}	2-amino-3-methylpyridine	1603–40–3
C_{6}H_{8}N_{2}	2-amino-4-methylpyridine	695–34–1
C_{6}H_{8}N_{2}	2-amino-5-methylpyridine	1603–41–4
C_{6}H_{8}N_{2}	2-amino-6-methylpyridine	1824–81–3
C_{6}H_{8}N_{2}O_{2}S	ethyl 2-aminothiazole-4-carboxylate	5398–36–7
C_{6}H_{8}N_{2}O_{2}S	sulfanilamide	63–74–1
C_{6}H_{8}O_{7}	citric acid	77–92–9
C_{6}H_{9}N_{3}O_{2}	histidine His	71–00–1
C_{6}H_{9}N_{3}O_{2}	ethyl 5-amino-1H-pyrazole-4-carboxylate	6994–25–8
C_{6}H_{9}N_{3}O_{3}	metronidazole	443–48–1
C_{6}H_{10}O_{2}	(2R)-2-Methylpent-4-enoic acid	
C_{6}H_{10}O_{3}	4-acetylbutyric acid	3128–06–1
C_{6}H_{10}O_{3}	butyl glyoxylate	6295–06–3
C_{6}H_{10}O_{3}	ethyl acetoacetate	141–97–9
C_{6}H_{10}O_{3}	2-hydroxypropyl acrylate	25584–83–2
C_{6}H_{10}O_{3}	pantolactone	599–04–2
C_{6}H_{10}O_{3}	propyl pyruvate	20279–43–0
C_{6}H_{10}O_{4}	aceburic acid	
C_{6}H_{10}O_{4}	adipic acid	
C_{6}H_{10}O_{4}	conduritol	
C_{6}H_{10}O_{4}	dianhydrohexitol	
C_{6}H_{10}O_{4}	ethylidene diacetate	
C_{6}H_{10}O_{4}	glucal	
C_{6}H_{11}NO_{2}	cycloleucine	52–52–8
C_{6}H_{11}NO_{2}	pipecolic acid	3105–95–1
C_{6}H_{12}	cyclohexane	110–82–7
C_{6}H_{12}N_{4}O_{3}	Streptolidine	29307-61-7
C_{6}H_{12}OS	4-Mercapto-4-methyl-2-pentanone	19872-52-7
C_{6}H_{12}O_{3}	4-Hydroxy-4-methylpentanoic acid	
C_{6}H_{12}O_{6}	fructose	7660–25–5
C_{6}H_{12}O_{6}	glucose	50–99–7
C_{6}H_{13}NO	N-ethylmorpholine	1119–29–5
C_{6}H_{13}NO_{2}	aminocaproic acid	60–32–2
C_{6}H_{13}NO_{2}	isoleucine Ile	73–32–5
C_{6}H_{13}NO_{2}	leucine Leu	61–90–5
C_{6}H_{14}	hexane	110–54–3
C_{6}H_{14}N_{2}O_{2}	lysine Lys	56–87–1
C_{6}H_{14}N_{2}O_{2}	N-Methylornithine	3485–66–3
C_{6}H_{14}N_{4}O_{2}	arginine Arg	74–79–3
C_{6}H_{14}O_{2}	1,6-hexanediol	
C_{6}H_{14}O_{3}	dipropylene glycol	
C_{6}H_{14}O_{3}	trimethylolpropane	
C_{6}H_{14}O_{4}	triethylene glycol	
C_{6}H_{15}NO_{3}	triethanolamine	
C_{6}H_{7}N_{3}O_{3}	2-Oxohistidine	181996-08-7
C_{6}N_{4}	tetracyanoethylene	
C_{7}H_{4}ClFO	2-Chloro-6-fluorobenzaldehyde	387-45-1
C_{7}H_{5}N_{3}O_{6}	trinitrotoluene	118-96-7
C_{7}H_{5}BrO	3-Bromobenzaldehyde	3132-99-8
C_{7}H_{5}Br_{3}O	2,4,6-tribromoanisole	
C_{7}H_{5}Cl_{2}NS	Chlorthiamide	1918-13-4
C_{7}H_{5}Cl_{3}O	2,4,6-trichloroanisole	
C_{7}H_{5}F_{3}O	2,4,6-trifluoroanisole	
C_{7}H_{5}FO_{2}	2-fluorobenzoic acid	445–29–4
C_{7}H_{5}FO_{2}	3-Fluorobenzoic acid	
C_{7}H_{5}FO_{2}	4-fluorobenzoic acid	456–22–4
C_{7}H_{5}NO_{4}	quinolinic acid	89–00–9
C_{7}H_{5}NO_{4}	dipicolinic acid	499–83–2
C_{7}H_{5}NS_{2}	2-mercaptobenzothiazole	149–30–4
C_{7}H_{5}N_{3}O_{2}	7-nitroindazole	2942–42–9
C_{7}H_{6}ClF	2-Chloro-6-fluorotoluene	443-83-4
C_{7}H_{6}N_{2}	7-azaindole	271–23–6
C_{7}H_{6}N_{2}	Benzimidazole	
C_{7}H_{6}O	tropone	
C_{7}H_{6}O_{2}	benzoic acid	65–85–0
C_{7}H_{6}O_{2}	4-hydroxybenzaldehyde	123–08–0
C_{7}H_{6}O_{3}	salicylic acid	69–72–7
C_{7}H_{6}O_{3}	4-hydroxybenzoic acid	99–96–7
C_{7}H_{6}O_{4}	protocatechuic acid	99–50–3
C_{7}H_{6}O_{4}	2,3-dihydroxybenzoic acid	303–38–8
C_{7}H_{6}O_{5}	gallic acid	149–91–7
C_{7}H_{7}BO_{4}	4-carboxyphenylboronic acid	14047–29–1
C_{7}H_{7}NO_{2}	4-aminobenzoic acid	150–13–0
C_{7}H_{7}NO_{2}	Homarine	445–30–7
C_{7}H_{7}NO_{3}	mesalazine	89–57–6
C_{7}H_{7}N_{3}	benomyl metabolite	934–32–7
C_{7}H_{8}	toluene	108–88–3
C_{7}H_{8}ClN_{3}O_{4}S_{2}	hydrochlorothiazide	58–93–5
C_{7}H_{8}N_{4}O_{2}	theophylline	58–55–9
C_{7}H_{8}N_{4}O_{2}	theobromine	
C_{7}H_{9}BO_{2}	4-methylphenylboronic acid	5720–05–8
C_{7}H_{9}BO_{3}	4-boronoanisole	5720–07–0
C_{7}H_{10}N_{2}	4-dimethylaminopyridine	1122–58–3
C_{7}H_{11}NO_{5}	N-Acetylglutamic acid	
C_{7}H_{12}O_{4}	diethyl malonate	
C_{7}H_{12}N_{2}O_{4}	aceglutamide	
C_{7}H_{14}O_{3}	n-Butyl lactate	138-22-7
C_{7}H_{14}O_{6}	bornesitol	
C_{7}H_{14}O_{6}	Methyl-α-D-galactose	3396-99-4
C_{7}H_{16}	heptane	142–82–5
C_{8}H_{4}F_{3}IO_{2}	Togni reagent II	
C_{8}H_{5}F_{3}N_{2}OS	riluzole	1744–22–5
C_{8}H_{5}NO_{2}	isatin	91–56–5
C_{8}H_{6}BrN	5-bromoindole	10075–50–0
C_{8}H_{6}BrN	6-bromoindole	52415–29–9
C_{8}H_{6}ClN	4-chloroindole	25235–85–2
C_{8}H_{6}Cl_{2}O_{3}	2,4-dichlorophenoxyacetic acid	94–75–7
C_{8}H_{6}N_{2}O	4-quinazolinol	491–36–1
C_{8}H_{6}N_{2}O_{2}	indazolium-3-carboxylate	4498–67–3
C_{8}H_{7}Cl	2-Chlorostyrene	2039-87-4
C_{8}H_{7}N	indole	120–72–9
C_{8}H_{7}NO	indol-4-ol	2380–94–1
C_{8}H_{7}NO	oxindole	59–48–3
C_{8}H_{7}NO	5-hydroxyindole	1953–54–4
C_{8}H_{7}N_{3}O_{2}	luminol	521-31-3
C_{8}H_{8}	cubane	277–10–1
C_{8}H_{8}N_{2}OS	2-amino-6-methoxybenzothiazole	1747–60–0
C_{8}H_{8}O_{3}	4-hydroxyphenylacetic acid	156–38–7
C_{8}H_{8}O_{3}	isovanillin	621–59–0
C_{8}H_{8}O_{4}	vanillic acid	121–34–6
C_{8}H_{9}NO_{2}	acetaminophen	103–90–2
C_{8}H_{9}NO_{2}	aminomethylbenzoic acid	56–91–7
C_{8}H_{9}NO_{2}	hydroxydanaidal	34199–35–4
C_{8}H_{9}NO_{2}	methyl anthranilate	134–20–3
C_{8}H_{10}IN	4-Iodo-N,N-dimethylaniline	698-70-4
C_{8}H_{10}N_{4}O_{2}	caffeine	58–08–2
C_{8}H_{11}NO	tyramine	51–67–2
C_{8}H_{11}N_{5}O_{3}	aciclovir	59277–89–3
C_{8}H_{16}	(1R,3R)-1,2,3-Trimethylcyclopentane	
C_{8}H_{16}O_{2}	cyclohexanedimethanol	
C_{8}H_{16}O_{6}	pinpollitol	
C_{8}H_{16}O_{6}	viscumitol	
C_{8}H_{16}O_{6}	Eleutheroside C ethyl galactoside	
C_{8}H_{18}	octane	111–65–9
C_{9}H_{6}BrN	4-bromoisoquinoline	1532–97–4
C_{9}H_{6}N_{2}	5-cyanoindole	15861–24–2
C_{9}H_{6}O_{3}	umbelliferone	93–35–6
C_{9}H_{6}OS	thiochromone	491–39–4
C_{9}H_{7}NO	8-hydroxyquinoline	148–24–3
C_{9}H_{7}NO	indole-3-carboxaldehyde	487–89–8
C_{9}H_{7}NO_{2}	indole-2-carboxylic acid	1477–50–5
C_{9}H_{7}NO_{2}	indole-3-carboxylic acid	771–50–6
C_{9}H_{8}N_{2}	5-aminoisoquinoline	1125–60–6
C_{9}H_{8}N_{2}	5-aminoquinoline	611–34–7
C_{9}H_{8}N_{2}	6-aminoquinoline	580–15–4
C_{9}H_{8}N_{2}	8-aminoquinoline	578–66–5
C_{9}H_{8}O_{2}	cinnamic acid	140–10–3
C_{9}H_{8}O_{3}	o-coumaric acid	614–60–8
C_{9}H_{8}O_{3}	m-coumaric acid	621–54–5
C_{9}H_{8}O_{3}	p-coumaric acid	7400–08–0
C_{9}H_{8}O_{4}	aspirin acetylsalicylic acid	50–78–2
C_{9}H_{8}O_{4}	caffeic acid	331–39–5
C_{9}H_{9}N	methylketol	95–20–5
C_{9}H_{9}N	skatole	83–34–1
C_{9}H_{9}NO	4-methoxyindole	4837–90–5
C_{9}H_{9}NO	5-methoxyindole	1006–94–6
C_{9}H_{9}NO	6-methoxyindole	3189–13–7
C_{9}H_{9}NO	indole-3-carbinol	700–06–1
C_{9}H_{9}NO_{3}	hippuric acid	495–69–2
C_{9}H_{9}NO_{6}	Stizolobic acid	15911-87-2
C_{9}H_{10}O	chavicol	
C_{9}H_{10}O	cinnamyl alcohol	104–54–1
C_{9}H_{10}O_{3}	paeonol	552–41–0
C_{9}H_{11}NO_{2}	phenylanine LPA	63–91–2
C_{9}H_{11}NO_{2}	phenylanine DLPA	150–30–1
C_{9}H_{11}NO_{3}	tyrosine Tyr	31330–59–3
C_{9}H_{11}NO_{4}	L-DOPA	59–92–7
C_{9}H_{12}O_{3}	4-Ipomeanol	32954-58-8
C_{9}H_{13}N_{5}O_{3}	S2242	
C_{9}H_{14}O_{3}	Boonein	
C_{9}H_{17}NO_{2}	gabapentin	60142–96–3
C_{9}H_{18}N_{2}O_{2}	1-boc-piperazine	57260–71–6
C_{9}H_{20}	nonane	111–84–2
C_{9}H_{20}N_{2}O_{2}S_{2}	Mono-BOC-cystamine	
C_{9}H_{20}N_{2}S	N,N'-Di-n-butylthiourea	109-46-6
C_{10}H_{4}Br_{5}NO	Pentabromopseudilin	10245-81-5
C_{10}H_{7}NO_{2}	Quinaldic acid	93–10–7
C_{10}H_{7}NO_{4}	6-Hydroxykynurenic acid	3778-29-8
C_{10}H_{7}N_{3}S	tiabendazole	
C_{10}H_{8}	azulene	275–51–4
C_{10}H_{8}	naphthalene	91–20–3
C_{10}H_{8}O_{3}	hymecromone	90–33–5
C_{10}H_{9}NO_{2}	indole-3-acetic acid	87–51–4
C_{10}H_{9}N_{5}O	kinetin	525–79–1
C_{10}H_{9}NO_{2}	5-methoxyindole-3-carboxaldehyde	10601–19–1
C_{10}H_{10}	Basketene	
C_{10}H_{10}N_{2}O	edaravone	89–25–8
C_{10}H_{10}N_{3}NaO_{5}	Suosan	140-46-5
C_{10}H_{10}O_{2}	safrole	
C_{10}H_{10}O_{4}	ferulic acid	1135–24–6
C_{10}H_{11}N_{3}O_{3}S	sulfamethoxazole	723–46–6
C_{10}H_{12}N_{2}	tryptamine	61–54–1
C_{10}H_{12}O	anethole	
C_{10}H_{12}O	estragole	
C_{10}H_{12}O_{2}	hinokitiol	
C_{10}H_{12}O_{2}	eugenol	
C_{10}H_{12}O_{2}	isoeugenol	
C_{10}H_{12}O_{2}	pseudoisoeugenol	
C_{10}H_{12}O_{3}	coniferyl alcohol	
C_{10}H_{13}N_{5}O_{4}	adenosine	58–61–7
C_{10}H_{14}ClNS	N-tert-Butylbenzenesulfinimidoyl chloride	49591-20-0
C_{10}H_{14}N_{2}	nicotine	54-11-5
C_{10}H_{14}Cl_{2}O_{4}Ti	Titanium bis(acetylacetonate)dichloride	17099-86-4
C_{10}H_{14}O	Carvone	99-49-0
C_{10}H_{15}Br	1-Bromoadamantane	768-90-1
C_{10}H_{15}ON	ephedrine	56370–30–0
C_{10}H_{16}	limonene	
C_{10}H_{16}O	camphor	76–22–2
C_{10}H_{17}NO_{3}	boc-4-piperidone	79099–07–3
C_{10}H_{18}N_{2}O_{8}	Fructose-asparagine	34393-27-6
C_{10}H_{18}N_{4}O_{2}S	Biotin hydrazide	66640-86-6
C_{10}H_{19}NO_{3}	1-boc-4-piperidinol	109384–19–2
C_{10}H_{20}N_{2}O_{2}	boc-4-aminopiperidine	87120–72–7
C_{10}H_{20}O_{2}	Paramenthane hydroperoxide	
C_{10}H_{22}	decane	124–18–5
C_{11}H_{8}O_{2}	menadione	58–27–5
C_{11}H_{10}O	β-Naphthol methyl ether	93-04-9
C_{11}H_{11}NO_{2}	3-indolepropionic acid	830–96–6
C_{11}H_{12}N_{2}O_{2}	tryptophan Trp	73–22–3
C_{11}H_{12}O_{3}	myristicin	
C_{11}H_{13}NO_{6}	Caramboxin; Diroximel fumarate	
C_{11}H_{14}N_{2}O	5-methoxytryptamine	608–07–1
C_{11}H_{14}O_{2}	methyl eugenol	
C_{11}H_{14}O_{2}	methyl isoeugenol	
C_{11}H_{16}O_{2}	Jasmolone	54383-66-3
C_{11}H_{19}NO_{4}	boc-isonipecotic acid	84358–13–4
C_{11}H_{21}N_{5}O_{5}	L-Arginine L-pyroglutamate	56265-06-6
C_{11}H_{24}	undecane	1120–21–4
C_{12}H_{11}NO_{5}	Macromomycin B	70213-45-5
C_{12}H_{4}Cl_{6}	2,2',3,3',4,4'-Hexachlorobiphenyl	11096-82-5
C_{12}H_{4}N_{4}	tetracyanoquinodimethane	1518–16–7
C_{12}H_{8}O_{4}	methoxsalen	298–81–7
C_{12}H_{10}	biphenyl	92–52–4
C_{12}H_{10}ClN_{2}O_{5}S	furosemide	54–31–9
C_{12}H_{11}N_{3}O_{2}	Furonazide	3460-67-1
C_{12}H_{11}N_{5}	6-benzylaminopurine	1214–39–7
C_{12}H_{11}N_{7}	triamterene	396–01–0
C_{12}H_{13}NO_{2}	indole-3-butyric acid	133–32–4
(C_{12}H_{14}CaO_{12})_{n}	calcium alginate	
C_{12}H_{14}O_{4}	apiole	
C_{12}H_{14}O_{4}	dillapiole	
C_{12}H_{15}NO	1-benzyl-4-piperidone	3612–20–2
C_{12}H_{16}N_{2}	Dimethyltryptamine	61–50–7
C_{12}H_{16}O_{3}	asarone	
C_{12}H_{16}O_{3}	elemicin	
C_{12}H_{16}O_{3}	isoelemicin	
C_{12}H_{16}O_{3}	oudenone	
C_{12}H_{16}O_{4}	2,4,5-Trimethoxypropiophenone	
C_{12}H_{16}O_{7}	arbutin	497–76–7
C_{12}H_{17}N_{5}O_{4}S	thiamine nitrate	
C_{12}H_{18}N_{4}O_{2}	E1210	
C_{12}H_{18}O	propofol	2078–54–8
C_{12}H_{18}O_{4}	Allixin; 1,6-Hexanediol diacrylate	
C_{12}H_{19}N_{3}O_{7}	D-Fructose-L-histidine	25020-13-7
C_{12}H_{21}N_{3}O_{8}	Aspartylglucosamine	2776-93-4
C_{12}H_{22}O_{4}	1,1'-Dihydroxydicyclohexyl peroxide	2407-94-5
C_{12}H_{22}O_{11}	maltose	69–79–4
C_{12}H_{22}O_{11}	sucrose	57–50–1
C_{12}H_{25}N	Stenusin	54985-88-5
C_{12}H_{26}	dodecane	112–40–3
C_{13}H_{20}	Tetracyclopropylmethane	332104-93-5
C_{13}H_{10}O	benzophenone	119–61–9
C_{13}H_{12}F_{2}N_{6}O	fluconazole	86386–73–4
C_{13}H_{12}O	β-ionone	2484–16–4
C_{13}H_{12}O_{2}	monobenzone	103–16–2
C_{13}H_{14}N_{2}O	harmaline	
C_{13}H_{16}N_{2}O_{2}	melatonin	73–31–4
C_{13}H_{18}O_{2}	ibuprofen	15687–27–1
C_{13}H_{28}	tridecane	629–50–5
C_{14}H_{10}	anthracene	120–12–7
C_{14}H_{10}	phenanthrene	85–01–8
C_{14}H_{10}O_{14}	benzoyl peroxide	94–36–0
C_{14}H_{11}Cl_{3}N_{2}O_{3}	RI-1	415713-60-9
C_{14}H_{11}NO_{3}	Isooncodine	122890-43-1
C_{14}H_{12}Br_{2}	meso-Stilbene dibromide	
C_{14}H_{12}O_{3}	resveratrol	501–36–0
C_{14}H_{13}F_{4}N_{3}O_{2}S	Flufenacet	142459-58-3
C_{14}H_{14}Cl_{2}N_{2}O	enilconazole	
C_{14}H_{16}N_{2}O_{4}	SCH 900271	915210-50-3
C_{14}H_{17}F_{3}N_{3}O_{2}	TDBzcholine	496972-30-6
C_{14}H_{18}N_{2}O_{5}	aspartame	81–14–1
C_{14}H_{18}N_{4}O_{3}	trimethoprim	738–70–5
C_{14}H_{18}O_{6}	Bis(2-methoxyethyl) phthalate	117–82–8
C_{14}H_{20}O_{5}	Integrasone	689278-00-0
C_{14}H_{30}	tetradecane	629–59–4
C_{15}H_{10}O_{4}	daidzein	486–66–8
C_{15}H_{10}O_{5}	apigenin	520–36–5
C_{15}H_{10}O_{5}	emodin	518–82–1
C_{15}H_{10}O_{5}	genistein	446–72–0
C_{15}H_{10}O_{6}	luteolin	491–70–3
C_{15}H_{10}O_{7}	quercetin	117–39–5
C_{15}H_{12}N_{2}O	carbamazepine	298–46–4
C_{15}H_{12}N_{2}O_{2}	phenytoin	57–41–0
C_{15}H_{13}NO_{4}	Darienine	111316-27-9
C_{15}H_{18}O_{2}	Curzerenone	20493-56-5
C_{15}H_{18}O_{3}	Arglabin	84692-91-1
C_{15}H_{24}O	nectaryl	95962-14-4
C_{15}H_{32}	pentadecane	629–62–9
C_{16}H_{13}NO_{4}	Virstatin	88909-96-0
C_{16}H_{14}O_{3}	ketoprofen	
C_{16}H_{19}NO_{4}	Norscopolamine	4684-28-0
C_{16}H_{19}NO_{5}	Peyonine	
C_{16}H_{22}FN_{5}O_{3}S	LY3372689	
C_{16}H_{28}N_{2}O_{6}Zn	zinc acexamate	70020–71–2
C_{16}H_{30}N_{4}O_{4}S	Biotin PEG2 amine	138529-46-1
C_{16}H_{34}	hexadecane	544–76–3
C_{17}H_{13}ClN_{4}	alprazolam	
C_{17}H_{14}F_{3}N_{3}O_{2}S	celecoxib	169590–42–5
C_{17}H_{14}N_{2}	Olivacine	484-49-1
C_{17}H_{14}O_{3}	5-Methyl-7-methoxyisoflavone	82517-12-2
C_{17}H_{14}N_{2}O_{5}S	Calmagite	3147-14-6
C_{17}H_{15}NO_{3}	Noroliveroline	83730-14-7
C_{17}H_{16}N_{2}O_{3}S	TSQ, 6-methoxy-(8-p-toluenesulfonamido)quinoline	109628-27-5
C_{17}H_{18}N_{2}O_{6}	nifedipine	21829–25–4
C_{17}H_{19}N_{3}O_{3}S	omeprazole	73590–58–6
C_{17}H_{21}NO_{4}	cocaine	50-36-2 53–21–4
C_{17}H_{22}O_{2}	cicutoxin	
C_{17}H_{22}O_{2}	oenanthotoxin	
C_{17}H_{24}O	falcarinol	
C_{17}H_{24}O_{9}	Eleutheroside B Syringin	
C_{17}H_{30}O_{8}	Glyceryl octyl ascorbic acid	
C_{17}H_{36}	heptadecane	629–78–7
C_{18}H_{12}Cl_{2}N_{2}O	boscalid	
C_{18}H_{16}N_{2}OS	INH1	
C_{18}H_{17}NO_{3}	Oliveroline	62504-55-6
C_{18}H_{17}NO_{3}	Xylopine	517–71–5
C_{18}H_{17}NO_{7}	Clovamide	53755-03-6
C_{18}H_{22}O_{2}	estrone	
C_{18}H_{23}NO_{6}	Tazopsine	
C_{18}H_{24}O_{2}	estradiol	
C_{18}H_{24}O_{3}	estriol	
C_{18}H_{24}O_{4}	estetrol	
C_{18}H_{27}NO_{3}	capsaicin	404–86–4
C_{18}H_{32}O_{2}	linoleic acid	60–33–3
C_{18}H_{36}O_{2}	stearic acid	57–11–4
C_{18}H_{38}	octadecane	593–45–3
C_{19}H_{10}Br_{2}O_{9}S	Bromopyrogallol red	16574-43-9
C_{19}H_{12}N_{2}O	6-Formylindolo(3,2-b)carbazole	
C_{19}H_{14}N_{2}O_{4}	C286	1952276-71-9
C_{19}H_{14}O_{6}	Landomycinone	
C_{19}H_{15}ClO_{4}	Coumachlor	81-82-3
C_{19}H_{16}ClNO_{4}	indometacin	53–86–1
C_{19}H_{22}N_{2}	Eburnamenine	
C_{19}H_{22}N_{2}O	Normacusine B	604-99-9
C_{19}H_{24}N_{2}O	Eburnamine	
C_{19}H_{26}O_{2}	androstenedione	
C_{19}H_{28}O_{2}	dehydroepiandrosterone	
C_{19}H_{28}O_{2}	testosterone	
C_{19}H_{30}O_{2}	androstenediol	
C_{19}H_{30}O_{2}	dihydrotestosterone	
C_{19}H_{40}	nonadecane	629–92–5
C_{20}H_{17}NO_{6}	Sibiricine	
C_{20}H_{19}N	N,N-Dibenzylaniline	91-73-6
C_{20}H_{20}N_{4}AgS_{2}O_{8}	Tetrakis(pyridine)silver(II) peroxydisulfate	15810-50-1
C_{20}H_{22}N_{2}O	Kopsanone	6662-83-5
C_{20}H_{22}N_{2}O_{2}	Pleiocarpamine	6393-66-4
C_{20}H_{22}O_{7}	Saudin	
C_{20}H_{23}BrN_{8}O	BX-912	702674-56-4
C_{20}H_{23}NO_{4}	Thebacon	466-90-0
C_{20}H_{24}O_{2}N_{2}	quinine	130–95–0
C_{20}H_{25}NO	Diphepanol	510-07-6
C_{20}H_{26}O_{3}	Crotogoudin	1252665-39-6
C_{20}H_{27}NO_{11}	amygdalin	29883–15–6
C_{20}H_{28}O_{2}	tretinoin	302–79–4
C_{20}H_{30}O_{3}	Neotripterifordin	
C_{20}H_{32}O_{5}	prostacyclin	
C_{20}H_{32}O_{5}	prostaglandin E2	
C_{20}H_{34}O_{5}	dinoprost	
C_{20}H_{42}	eicosane	112–95–8
C_{21}H_{16}FN_{7}	AMG 319	1608125-21-8
C_{21}H_{18}FN_{5}O_{5}S	Avutometinib	
C_{21}H_{19}ClN_{4}O_{2}	Setanaxib	1218942-37-0
C_{21}H_{20}O_{6}	curcumin	
C_{21}H_{22}N_{2}O_{4}	Picralinal	
C_{21}H_{22}O_{4}	Taxamairin A	110300-76-0
C_{21}H_{23}FN_{2}O_{4}	Z-FA-FMK	
C_{21}H_{24}FN_{6}O_{6}P	Rovafovir etalafenamide	
C_{21}H_{25}NO_{4}	Yuanhunine	104387-15-7
C_{21}H_{26}O_{4}	Canniprene	
C_{21}H_{27}N_{5}	D75-4590	
C_{21}H_{30}O_{2}	progesterone	57-83-0
C_{21}H_{30}O_{2}	tetrahydrocannabinol	1972–08–3
C_{21}H_{36}N_{7}O_{16}P_{3}S	Coenzyme A	31416–98–5
C_{21}H_{39}NO_{3}	N-Oleoylsarcosine	110-25-8
C_{21}H_{44}N_{2}	N-Oleyl-1,3-propanediamine	7173-62-8
C_{22}H_{23}ClN_{2}O_{2}	loratadine	79794–75–5
C_{22}H_{26}O_{7}	L-165041	79558-09-1
C_{22}H_{28}N_{2}O	fentanyl	
C_{22}H_{30}O_{8}	Neurolenin B	
C_{23}H_{13}Cl_{2}Na_{3}O_{9}S	Chrome Azurol S	1667-99-8
C_{23}H_{19}ClF_{3}NO_{3}	cyhalothrin	
C_{23}H_{24}O_{4}S	Kadethrin	58769-20-3
C_{23}H_{28}N_{2}O	Iferanserin	58754-46-4
C_{23}H_{28}N_{2}O_{4}	Pleiocarpine	
C_{23}H_{38}N_{2}OS	Laucysteinamide A	2255376-67-9
C_{23}H_{41}NO_{2}	Terminaline	15112-49-9
C_{24}H_{17}F_{6}NO_{3}	Tarocin A	
C_{24}H_{29}FN_{6}	Ralimetinib	862505-00-8
C_{24}H_{45}CrO_{6}	Chromium(III) 2-ethylhexanoate	3444-17-5
C_{25}H_{30}O_{8}	Kadsurin	51670-40-7
C_{25}H_{36}O_{6}	Pseudopterosin A	104855-20-1
C_{26}H_{32}N_{6}O_{11}	Mirubactin	
C_{26}H_{37}N_{3}O	Tarocin B	
C_{26}H_{38}O_{6}	Pseudopterosin E	
C_{27}H_{27}Cl_{2}N_{5}O_{3}S	JD5037	
C_{27}H_{33}N_{3}O_{5}	Andrimid	108868-95-7
C_{27}H_{50}O_{6}	Axona	538-23-8
C_{28}H_{26}ClN_{5}O	Basic Black 2	4443–99–6
C_{28}H_{37}NO_{8}	Nargenicin	70695-02-2
C_{28}H_{42}N_{4}O_{6}	Kukoamine A	75288-96-9
C_{28}H_{47}NO_{3}	Pingbeinine	131984-89-9
C_{29}H_{42}N_{10}O_{9}	Argadin	
C_{29}H_{40}N_{2}O_{6}	Dihydromaltophilin	203304-22-7
C_{30}H_{19}NO_{9}	Dynemicin A	
C_{30}H_{42}O_{11}	Decinnamoyltaxinine J	
C_{30}H_{46}O_{6}	Retigeric acid B	
C_{33}H_{28}O_{9}	Rubicordifolin	849699-55-4
C_{33}H_{38}O_{11}	Triptofordin C-2	111514-63-7
C_{34}H_{46}O_{18}	Eleutheroside D	
C_{35}H_{42}O_{14}	Taxinine M	
C_{35}H_{60}O_{6}	Eleutheroside A	
C_{36}N_{2}O_{6}	Cepharanoline	
C_{37}H_{44}O_{13}	Taxagifine	
C_{37}H_{48}N_{2}O_{8}	Cytotrienin A	
C_{37}H_{59}N_{5}O_{6}	Caldoramide	1961308-67-7
C_{37}H_{64}O_{6}	Chamuvarinin	
C_{38}H_{65}NO_{29}	lacto-n-difucohexaose II	
C_{39}H_{48}N_{2}O_{9}	Kidamycin	11072-82-5
C_{40}H_{48}N_{6}O_{10}	Bouvardin	
C_{40}H_{53}NO_{14}	Cosmomycin B	77517-27-2
C_{40}H_{56}	lycopene	
C_{40}H_{60}BNaO_{14}	Aplasmomycin	61230-25-9
C_{41}H_{50}N_{2}O_{10}	Neopluramycin	
C_{41}H_{50}N_{2}O_{11}	Hedamycin	11048–97–8
C_{44}H_{55}NO_{16}	Milataxel	352425-37-7
C_{44}H_{69}N_{15}O_{9}S	adrenorphin	
C_{48}H_{56}N_{10}O_{12}S_{6}	Thiocoraline	
C_{52}H_{48}MoN_{4}P_{4}	Bis(dinitrogen)bis(1,2-bis(diphenylphosphino)ethane)molybdenum(0)	25145-64-6
C_{55}H_{74}IN_{3}O_{21}S_{4}	calicheamicin	
C_{58}H_{84}N_{12}O_{26}	Mannopeptimycin glycopeptide	
C_{59}H_{80}N_{4}O_{22}S_{4}	esperamicin	
C_{59}H_{103}N_{3}O_{18}	Niphimycin	12676-71-0
C_{60}	Buckminsterfullerene	99685-96-8
C_{61}H_{60}N_{14}O_{18}S_{5}	Nocathiacin I	
C_{62}H_{89}CoN_{13}O_{15}P	hydroxocobalamin	
C_{63}H_{88}CoN_{14}O_{14}P	Vitamin B12	68-19-9
C_{63}H_{88}CoN_{14}O_{14}P	cyanocobalamin	
C_{63}H_{91}CoN_{13}O_{14}P	methylcobalamin	
C_{72}H_{100}CoN_{18}O_{17}P	adenosylcobalamin	
C_{76}H_{52}O_{46}	Tannic acid	1401-55-4
C_{77}H_{101}N_{17}O_{26}	Surotomycin	
C_{77}H_{120}N_{18}O_{26}S	alpha-Endorphin	
C_{79}H_{145}N_{17}O_{17}	Paenibacterin	1400801-10-6
C_{83}H_{131}N_{19}O_{27}S	gamma-Endorphin	
C_{131}H_{200}N_{30}O_{43}S_{2}	amidorphin	
C_{158}H_{251}N_{39}O_{46}S	beta-Endorphin	
C_{161}H_{236}N_{42}O_{48}	leumorphin	
C_{164}H_{256}Na_{2}O_{68}S_{2}	maitotoxin	59392–53–9
C_{172}H_{284}ClN_{53}O_{41}	JV-1-36	
C_{169719}H_{270466}N_{45688}O_{52238}S_{911}	titin	

== Ca–Cu ==
Chemical formula	Synonyms	CAS number
CaAl_{2}O_{4}	calcium aluminate	12042–68–1
CaB_{6}	calcium boride	12007–99–7
CaBr_{2}	calcium bromide	7789–41–5
Ca(BrO)_{2}	calcium hypobromite	
Ca(BrO_{2})_{2}	calcium bromite	
Ca(BrO_{3})_{2}	calcium bromate	10102–75–7
Ca(BrO_{4})_{2}	calcium perbromate	
Ca(CN)_{2}	calcium cyanide	592–01–8
CaCO_{3}	calcium carbonate spent lime calcite limestone marble	471–34–1
CaC_{2}	calcium carbide	75–20–7
Ca(CHO_{2})_{2}	calcium formate	544–17–2
Ca(C_{2}H_{3}O_{2})_{2}	calcium acetate	62–54–4
CaC_{2}O_{4}	calcium oxalate	563–72–4
CaCN_{2}	calcium cyanamide	156–62–7
CaCl_{2}	calcium chloride	10043–52–4
Ca(ClO)_{2}	calcium hypochlorite	7778–54–3
Ca(ClO_{2})_{2}	calcium chlorite	
Ca(ClO_{3})_{2}	calcium chlorate	10137–74–3
Ca(ClO_{4})_{2}	calcium perchlorate	13477–36–6
CaF_{2}	calcium fluoride fluorite	7789–75–5
CaH_{2}	calcium hydride	7789–78–8
CaHPO_{4}	dicalcium phosphate	7757–93–9
Ca(H_{2}PO_{2})_{2}	calcium hypophosphite	7789–79–9
Ca(HS)_{2}	calcium hydrosulfide	12133–28–7
CaI_{2}	calcium iodide	10102–68–8
Ca(IO)_{2}	calcium hypoiodite	
Ca(IO_{2})_{2}	calcium iodite	
Ca(IO_{3})_{2}	calcium iodate	7789–80–2
Ca(IO_{4})_{2}	calcium periodate	
CaMoO_{4}	calcium molybdate	7789–82–4
Ca(NO_{2})_{2}	calcium nitrite	13780–06–8
Ca(NO_{3})_{2}	calcium nitrate	10124–37–5
Ca(NO_{3})_{2}·4H_{2}O	Calcium nitrate tetrahydrate	13477–34–4
Ca(NbO_{3})_{2}	calcium metaniobate	
CaO	quicklime calcium oxide burnt lime	1305–78–8
Ca(OH)_{2}	calcium hydroxide slaked lime	1305–62–0
CaO_{2}	calcium peroxide	1305–79–9
CaP	calcium monophosphide	39373–03–0
CaS	calcium sulfide hepar calcies sulfurated lime oldhamite	20548–54–3
CaSO_{3}	calcium sulfite	10257–55–3
CaSO_{4}	calcium sulfate	7778–18–9
CaSO_{4}·0.5H_{2}O	plaster of paris calcium sulfate hemihydrate	10034–76–1
CaSe	calcium selenide	1305–84–6
CaSeO_{3}	calcium selenite	13780–18–2
CaSeO_{4}	calcium selenate	14019–91–1
CaSiO_{3}	calcium metasilicate wollastonite	1344–95–2
CaTe	calcium telluride	12013–57–9
CaTeO_{3}	calcium tellurite	13812–57–2
CaTeO_{4}	calcium tellurate	15852–09–2
CaTiO_{3}	calcium titanate	12049–50–2
Ca(VO_{3})_{2}	calcium metavanadate	12135–52–3
Ca(VO_{4})_{2}	calcium orthovanadate	
CaWO_{4}	calcium tungstate	7790–75–2
Ca_{3}(AsO_{4})_{2}	calcium arsenate	7778–44–1
Ca_{3}N_{2}	calcium nitride	12013–82–0
Ca_{3}P_{2}	calcium phosphide	1305–99–3
Ca_{3}(PO_{4})_{2}	tricalcium phosphate	7758–87–4
Ca_{4}(PO_{4})_{2}O	tetracalcium phosphate	1306–01–0
Ca_{5}(PO_{4})_{3}F	calcium fluorophosphate	12015–73–5
Ca_{5}(PO_{4})_{3}(OH)	hydroxyapatite	
CdBr_{2}	cadmium bromide	7789–42–6
Cd(CN)_{2}	cadmium cyanide	542–83–6
CdCO_{3}	cadmium carbonate	513–78–0
Cd(C_{2}H_{3}O_{2})_{2}	cadmium acetate	543–90–8
CdC_{2}O_{4}	cadmium oxalate	814–88–0
CdCl_{2}	cadmium chloride	10108–64–2
CdCrO_{4}	cadmium chromate	14312–00–6
CdF_{2}	cadmium fluoride	7790–79–6
CdI_{2}	cadmium iodide	7790–80–9
Cd(IO_{3})_{2}	cadmium iodate	7790–81–0
CdMoO_{4}	cadmium molybdate	13972–68–4
Cd(NO_{3})_{2}	cadmium nitrate	10325–94–7
Cd(N_{3})_{2}	cadmium azide	14215–29–3
CdO	cadmium oxide	1306–19–0
Cd(OH)_{2}	cadmium hydroxide	21041–95–2
CdS	cadmium sulfide greenockite	1306–23–6
CdSO_{3}	cadmium sulfite	13477–23–1
CdSO_{4}	cadmium sulfate	10124–36–4
CdSb	cadmium antimonide	12014–29–8
CdSe	cadmium selenide cadmoselite	1306–24–7
CdSeO_{3}	cadmium selenite	13814–59–0
CdSiO_{3}	cadmium metasilicate	13477–19–5
Cd(TaO_{3})_{2}	cadmium metatantalate	12292–07–8
CdTe	cadmium telluride	1306–25–8
CdTeO_{4}	cadmium tellurate	15852–14–9
CdTiO_{3}	cadmium titanate	12014–14–1
CdWO_{4}	cadmium tungstate	7790–85–4
CdZrO_{3}	cadmium metazirconate	
Cd_{2}Nb_{2}O_{7}	cadmium niobate	12187–14–3
Cd_{3}As_{2}	cadmium arsenide	12006–15–4
Cd_{3}P_{2}	cadmium phosphide	12014–28–7
Cd_{3}(PO_{4})_{2}	cadmium phosphate	13477–17–3
CeB_{6}	cerium boride	12008–02–5
CeBr_{3}	cerium(III) bromide	14457–87–5
CeC	cerium carbide	12012–32–7
CeCl_{3}	cerium(III) chloride	7790–86–5
CeF_{3}	cerium(III) fluoride	7758–88–5
CeF_{4}	cerium(IV) fluoride	7758–88–5
CeI_{2}	cerium(II) iodide	19139–47–0
CeI_{3}	cerium(III) iodide	7790–87–6
CeN	cerium nitride	25764–08–3
CeO_{2}	cerium(IV) oxide cerianite	1306–38–3
CeS	cerium(II) sulfide	12014–82–3
Ce(SO_{4})_{2}	cerium(IV) sulfate	13590–82–4
CeSi_{2}	cerium silicide	12014–85–6
Ce_{2}C_{3}	cerium(III) carbide	12115–63–8
Ce_{2}O_{3}	cerium(III) oxide	1345–13–7
Ce_{2}S_{3}	cerium(III) sulfide	12014–93–6
CF_{3}Cl	chlorotrifluoromethane	75–72–9
CF_{4}	tetrafluoromethane	75–73–0
ClF	chlorine fluoride	7790–89–8
ClF_{3}	chlorine trifluoride	7790–91–2
ClF_{5}	chlorine pentafluoride	13637–63–3
ClOClO_{3}	chlorine perchlorate	27218–16–2
ClO_{2}	chlorine dioxide	10049–04–4
ClO_{3}F	chlorine trioxide fluoride	7616–94–6
Cl_{2}	chlorine	7782–50–5
Cl_{2}O_{3}	chlorine trioxide	17496–59–2
Cl_{2}O_{6}	chlorine hexoxide	12442–63–6
Cl_{2}O_{7}	chlorine heptoxide	10294–48–1
Cl_{2}O_{8}	Chlorine octaoxide	
CoAl_{2}O_{4}	cobalt(II) aluminate	13820–62–7
CoAs	cobalt arsenide	27016–73–5
CoAs_{2}	cobalt(II) arsenide	12044–42–7
CoB	cobalt(II) boride	12006–77–8
CoBr_{2}	cobalt(II) bromide	7789–43–7
Co(CN)_{2}	cobalt(II) cyanide	542–84–7
Co(C_{2}H_{3}O_{2})_{2}	cobalt(II) acetate	71–48–7
Co(C_{2}H_{3}O_{2})_{3}	cobalt(III) acetate	917–69–1
CoC_{2}O_{4}	cobalt(II) oxalate	814–89–1
Co(ClO_{4})_{2}	cobalt(II) perchlorate	13455–31–7
CoCl_{2}	cobalt(II) chloride	7646–79–9
CoCrO_{4}	cobalt(II) chromate	24613–38–5
CoCr_{2}O_{4}	cobalt(II) chromite	13455–25–9
CoF_{2}	cobalt(II) fluoride	10026–17–2
CoF_{3}	cobalt(III) fluoride	10026–18–3
CoFe_{2}O_{4}	cobalt ferrite	12052–28–7
Co(IO_{3})_{2}	cobalt(II) iodate	13455–28–2
CoI_{2}	cobalt(II) iodide	15238–00–3
CoMoO_{4}	cobalt(II) molybdate	13762–14–6
Co(NO_{3})_{2}	cobalt(II) nitrate	10141–05–6
Co(NO_{3})_{3}	cobalt(III) nitrate	15520–84–0
CoO	cobalt(II) oxide	1307–96–6
Co(OH)_{2}	cobalt(II) hydroxide	21041–93–0
Co(OH)_{3}	cobalt(III) hydroxide	1307–86–4
CoS	cobalt(II) sulfide	1317–42–6
CoS_{2}	cobalt disulfide	12013–10–4
CoSb	cobalt antimonide	12052–42–5
CoSe	cobalt(II) selenide	1307–99–9
CoSeO_{3}	cobalt(II) selenite	10026–23–0
CoTe	cobalt(II) telluride	12017–13–9
CoTiO_{3}	cobalt(II) titanate	12017–01–5
CoWO_{4}	cobalt(II) tungstate	12640–47–0
Co_{2}B	cobalt boride	12045–01–1
Co(C_{18}H_{33}O_{2})_{2}	Cobalt oleate	
Co_{2}SO_{4}	cobalt(II) sulfate	10124–43–3
Co_{2}S_{3}	cobalt(III) sulfide	1332–71–4
Co_{2}SiO_{4}	cobalt(II) orthosilicate	12017–08–2
Co_{2}SnO_{4}	cobalt(II) stannate	12139–93–4
Co_{2}TiO_{4}	cobalt(II) titanite	12017–38–8
Co_{3}(AsO_{4})_{2}	cobalt arsenate	
Co_{3}(Fe(CN)_{6})_{2}	cobalt(II) ferricyanide	14049–81–1
CrBr_{2}	chromium(II) bromide	10049–25–9
CrBr_{3}	chromium(III) bromide	10031–25–1
CrCl_{2}	chromium(II) chloride	10049–05–5
CrCl_{3}	chromium(III) chloride	10025–73–7
CrCl_{4}	chromium(IV) chloride	15597–88–3
CrF_{2}	chromium(II) fluoride	10049–10–2
CrF_{3}	chromium(III) fluoride	7788–97–8
CrF_{4}	chromium(IV) fluoride	10049–11–3
CrF_{5}	chromium(V) fluoride	13843–28–2
CrF_{6}	chromium(VI) fluoride	13843–28–2
CrI_{2}	chromium(II) iodide	13478–28–9
CrI_{3}	chromium(III) iodide	13569–75–0
Cr(NO_{3})_{3}	chromium(III) nitrate	13548–38–4
Cr(NO_{2})_{3}	chromium(III) nitrite	
Cr(OH)_{3}	chromium(III) hydroxide	1308–14–1
CrO_{2}	chromium(IV) oxide	12018–01–8
CrO_{3}	chromium(VI) oxide	1333–82–0
CrO_{4}^{2−}	chromate ion	13907–45–4
CrO_{2}Cl_{2}	chromium(VI) oxychloride	14977–61–8
CrPO_{4}	chromium(III) phosphate	7789–04–0
CrSb	chromium antimonide	12053–12–2
CrSe	chromium(II) selenide	12053–13–3
CrSi_{2}	chromium(II) silicide	12018–09–6
CrVO_{4}	chromium(III) orthovanadate	
Cr_{2}O_{3}	chromium(III) oxide eskolaite	1308–38–9
Cr_{2}(SO_{4})_{3}	chromium(III) sulfate	10101–53–8
Cr_{2}S_{3}	chromium(III) sulfide	12018–22–3
Cr_{2}Se_{3}	chromium(III) selenide	
Cr_{2}(TeO_{4})_{3}	chromium(III) tellurate	
Cr_{2}Te_{3}	chromium(III) telluride	12053–39–3
Cr_{3}As_{2}	chromium(II) arsenide	
Cr_{3}C_{2}	chromium(II) carbide	12012–35–0
Cr_{3}Sb_{2}	chromium(II) antimonide	
CsBO_{2}	caesium borate	92141–86–1
CsBr	caesium bromide	7787–69–1
CsBrO	caesium hypobromite	
CsBrO_{2}	caesium bromite	
CsBrO_{3}	caesium bromate	13454–75–6
CsBrO_{4}	caesium perbromate	
CsBr_{3}	caesium tribromide	14023–00–8
CsCN	caesium cyanide	21159–32–0
CsCNO	caesium cyanate	
CsCNO	caesium fulminate	
CsC_{2}H_{3}O_{2}	caesium acetate	3396–11–0
CsCl	caesium chloride	7647–17–8
CsClO	caesium hypochlorite	
CsClO_{2}	caesium chlorite	
CsClO_{3}	caesium chlorate	13763–67–2
CsClO_{4}	caesium perchlorate	13454–84–7
CsF	caesium fluoride	13400–13–0
CsH	caesium hydride	13772–47–9
CsHS	caesium hydrosulfide	
CsI	caesium iodide	7789–17–5
CsIO	caesium hypoiodite	
CsIO_{2}	caesium iodite	
CsIO_{3}	caesium iodate	13454–81–4
CsIO_{4}	caesium periodate	13478–04–1
CsI_{3}	caesium triiodide	12297–72–2
CsNH_{2}	caesium amide	22205–57–8
CsNO_{2}	caesium nitrite	13454–83–6
CsNO_{3}	caesium nitrate	7789–18–6
CsN_{3}	caesium azide	22750–57–8
CsNbO_{3}	caesium niobate	12053–66–6
Cs_{2}NbO_{3}	caesium metaniobate	
CsOH	caesium hydroxide	21351–79–1
CsO_{2}	caesium superoxide	12018–61–0
Cs_{2}O_{2}	caesium peroxide	
Cs_{2}S	caesium sulfide	12214–16–3
CsSCN	caesium thiocyanate	3879–01–4
CsSeO_{4}	caesium selenate	10326–29–1
CsTaO_{3}	caesium metatantalate	12158–56–4
Cs_{2}CO_{3}	caesium carbonate	29703–01–3
CsHCO_{3}	caesium bicarbonate	15519–28–5
CsH_{2}PO_{3}	monocaesium phosphite	
CsH_{2}PO_{4}	monocaesium phosphate	18649–05–3
CsHSO_{3}	caesium bisulfite	
CsHSO_{4}	caesium hydrogen sulfate	7789–16–4
Cs_{2}C_{2}O_{4}	caesium oxalate	1068–63–9
Cs_{2}CrO_{4}	caesium chromate	13454–78–9
Cs_{2}Cr_{2}O_{7}	caesium dichromate	13530–67–1
Cs_{2}HPO_{4}	caesium hydrogen orthophosphate	
Cs_{2}MoO_{4}	caesium molybdate	13597–64–3
Cs_{2}O	caesium oxide	20281–00–9
Cs_{2}SO_{3}	caesium sulfite	
Cs_{2}SO_{4}	caesium sulfate	10294–54–9
Cs_{2}SiO_{3}	caesium metasilicate	15586–77–3
Cs_{2}TeO_{4}	caesium tellurate	34729–54–9
Cs_{2}TiO_{3}	caesium titanate caesium metatitanate	12158–57–5
Cs_{2}WO_{4}	caesium orthotungstate	13587–19–4
Cs_{2}HPO_{3}	dicaesium phosphite	
Cs_{2}HPO_{4}	dicaesium phosphate	
Cs_{3}PO_{3}	tricaesium phosphite	
Cs_{3}PO_{4}	caesium orthophosphate	17893–64–0
Cs_{3}VO_{4}	caesium orthovanadate	34283–69–7
CuBr	copper(I) bromide	7787–70–4
Cu(BrO_{3})_{2} · 6H_{2}O	copper(II) bromate hexahydrate	
CuBr_{2}	copper(II) bromide	7789–45–9
CuC_{2}O_{4}	copper oxalate	814–91–5
Cu(CH3COO)	copper(I) acetate	598–54–9
Cu(CH_{3}COO)_{2}	copper(II) acetate	142–71–2
CuCl	copper(I) chloride	7758–89–6
Cu(ClO_{3})_{2}·6H_{2}O	copper(II) chlorate hexahydrate	13478–36–9
CuCl_{2}	copper(II) chloride	7447–39–4
CuF	copper(I) fluoride	7789–19–7
CuF_{2}	copper(II) fluoride	11113–59–0
CuFeS_{2}	copper iron sulfide chalcopyrite	12015–76–8
CuFe_{2}O_{4}	copper(II) iron(II) oxide	37220–43–2
CuFe_{2}S_{3}	copper iron sulfide cubanite	37293–35–9
[Cu(H_{2}O)_{4}]SO_{4}·H_{2}O	blue vitriol	
CuI	copper(I) iodide	7681–65–4
CuIO_{3}	copper(I) iodate	
Cu(IO_{3})_{2}	copper(II) iodate	13454–89–2
CuMoO_{4}	copper(II) orthomolybdate	
Cu(NO_{3})_{2}	copper(II) nitrate	3251–23–8
Cu(NO_{3})_{2} · 3H_{2}O	copper(II) nitrate trihydrate	10031–43–3
Cu(NO_{3})_{2} · 6H_{2}O	copper(II) nitrate hexahydrate	10294–41–4
Cu(NbO_{3})_{2}	copper(II) orthoniobate	
CuO	copper(II) oxide	1317–38–0
Cu_{2}O	copper(I) oxide	1317–39–1
Cu(OH)_{2}	copper(II) hydroxide	20427–59–2
Cu_{2}(OH)_{2}CO_{3}	basic copper carbonate	12069–69–1
CuS	copper(II) sulfide covellite	1317–40–4
CuSCN	copper(I) thiocyanate	1111–67–7
CuSO_{4}	copper(II) sulfate	7758–98–7
CuSO_{4}·5H_{2}O	copper(II) sulfate pentahydrate	7758–99–8
CuSe	copper(II) selenide	37359–15–2
CuSeO_{3}·2H_{2}O	copper(II) selenite dihydrate	15168–20–4
CuSeO_{4}·5H_{2}O	copper(II) selenate pentahydrate	
CuSiO_{3}	copper(II) metasilicate	
CuTe	copper(II) telluride	12019–23–7
CuTeO_{3}	copper(II) tellurite	13812–58–3
CuTiO_{3}	copper(II) metatitanate	12019–08–8
Cu(VO_{3})_{2}	copper(II) metavanadate	14958–34–0
CuWO_{4}	copper(II) orthotungstate	13587–35–4
Cu_{2}CO_{3}(OH)_{2}	malachite	1319–53–5
Cu_{2}S	copper(I) sulfide chalcocite	21112–20–9
Cu_{2}Se	copper(I) selenide	20405–64–5
Cu_{2}Te	copper(I) telluride	12019–52–2
Cu_{3}As	copper(I) arsenide	12005–75–3
Cu_{3}P	copper(I) phosphide	12019–57–7
Cu_{3}(PO_{4})_{2}	copper(II) phosphate	7798–23–4
Cu_{3}Sb	copper(III) antimonide	12054–25–0
Cu_{9}S_{5}	copper sulfide digenite	

== D ==
Chemical formula	Synonyms	CAS Number
DBr	deuterium bromide	13536–59–9
DI	deuterium iodide	
DLi	lithium deuteride	13587–16–1
DNa	sodium deuteride	15780–28–6
D_{2}O	heavy water	7789–20–0
D_{3}O^{+}	trideuterioxonium ion	
DyBr_{3}	dysprosium(III) bromide	14456–48–5
DyCl_{2}	dysprosium(II) chloride	13767–31–2
DyCl_{3}	dysprosium(III) chloride	10025–74–8
DySi_{2}	dysprosium(II) silicide	12133–07–2
Dy_{2}O_{3}	dysprosium(III) oxide	1308–87–8
Dy_{2}S_{3}	dysprosium(III) sulfide	12133–10–7

== E ==
Chemical formula	Synonyms	CAS number
ErCl_{3}	erbium(III) chloride	10138–41–7
ErF	erbium monofluoride	16087–67–5
ErF_{2}	erbium difluoride	16087–65–3
ErF_{3}	erbium trifluoride	13760–83–3
ErI_{3}	erbium triiodide	13813–42–8
ErI_{4}Na	erbium sodium tetraiodide	129863–13–4
ErO	erbium monoxide	12280–61–4
EuCl_{2}	europium(II) chloride	13769–20–5
EuCl_{3}	europium(III) chloride	10025–76–0
EuF	europium monofluoride	17209–60–8
EuF_{3}	europium trifluoride	13765–25–8
EuI_{2}	europium diiodide	22015–35–6
EuNbO_{2}	europium niobium dioxide	107069–78–3
EuNb_{2}O_{6}	europium diniobium hexaoxide	55216–32–5
EuO	europium monoxide	12020–60–9
EuO_{2}V	monoeuropium monovandium dioxide	88762–30–5
EuO_{3}Ti	europium titanium trioxide	12020–61–0
EuO_{3}V	europium metavanadate	39432–21–8
EuO_{4}W	europium tungsten tetraoxide	13537–12–7
EuS	europium monosulfide	12020–65–4
EuSO_{4}	europium(II) sulfate	10031–54–6
EuS_{2}	europium disulfide	55957–42–1
Eu_{2}O	dieuropium monoxide	62462–47–9
Eu_{2}O_{2}	dieuropium dioxide	62462–48–0
Eu_{2}O_{3}	europium(III) oxide	1308–96–9
Eu_{2}S	dieuropium monosulfide	62462–49–1
Eu_{2}S_{2}	dieuropium disulfide	62462–51–5
Eu_{2}(SO_{4})_{3}	europium(III) sulfate	13537–15–0

== F ==
Chemical formula	Synonyms	CAS number
FGa	gallium monofluoride	13966–78–4
FGaO	gallium monofluoride monoxide	15586–66–0
FGd	gadolinium monofluoride	12259–18–6
FGe	germanium monofluoride	14929–46–5
FHo	holmium monofluoride	16087–66–4
FI	iodine monofluoride	13873–84–2
FI_{2}	monofluorodiiodine	58751–33–0
FIn	indium monofluoride	13966–95–5
FLa	lanthanum monofluoride	13943–44–7
FLi	lithium fluoride	7789–24–4
FLiO	lithium hypofluorite	34240–84–1
FLi_{2}	dilithium monofluoride	50644–69–4
FMg	magnesium monofluoride	14953–28–7
FMn	monomanganese monofluoride	13569–25–0
FMnO_{3}	manganese fluoride trioxide	15586–97–7
FMo	molybdenum monofluoride	60388–18–3
FN	fluoroimidogen	13967–06–1
FNO	nitrosyl fluoride	7789–25–5
FNO_{2}	nitryl fluoride	10022–50–1
FNO_{3}	fluorine nitrate	7789–26–6
FNS	thiazyl fluoride	18820–63–8
FNa	sodium fluoride	7681–49–4
FNa_{2}	disodium monofluoride	87331–13–3
FNd	neodymium monofluoride	13940–77–7
FO	oxygen monofluoride	12061–70–0
FOTh	thorium monofluoride monoxide	19797–90–1
FOTi	titanium fluoride oxide	17497–75–5
FO_{2}	dioxygen monofluoride	15499–23–7
FO_{3}S	fluorosulfate radical	21549–02–0
FP	phosphorus monofluoride	16027–92–2
FPS	phosphenothious fluoride	55753–39–4
FPS_{2}	phosphenodithioic fluoride	137649–46–8
FPb	lead monofluoride	14986–72–2
FPu	plutonium monofluoride	20882–16–0
FRb	rubidium fluoride	13446–74–7
FS	monosulfur monofluoride	16068–96–5
FSc	scandium monofluoride	14017–33–5
FSm	samarium monofluoride	17209–59–5
FSn	tin monofluoride	13966–74–0
FSr	strontium monofluoride	13569–27–2
FTh	thorium monofluoride	51686–34–1
FTi	titanium fluoride	18025–22–4
FTl	thallium monofluoride	7789–27–7
FW	tungsten monofluoride	51621–16–0
FXe	xenon monofluoride	16757–14–5
FY	yttrium monofluoride	13981–88–9
FZr	zirconium fluoride	13569–28–3
F_{2}	fluorine	7782–41–4
F_{2}Fe	ferrous fluoride	7789–28–8
F_{2}Ga	gallium difluoride	51777–79–8
F_{2}Gd	gadolinium difluoride	12259–19–7
F_{2}Ge	germanium difluoride	13940–63–1
F_{2}GeO	difluorogermanone	72190–38–6
F_{2}Hg	mercury fluoride	7783–39–3
F_{2}Hg_{2}	mercury fluoride	13967–25–4
F_{2}Ho	holmium difluoride	16087–64–2
F_{2}IP	difluoroiodophosphine	13819–11–9
F_{2}K_{2}	dipotassium difluoride	12285–62–0
F_{2}Kr	krypton difluoride	13773–81–4
F_{2}La	lanthanum difluoride	15948–68–2
F_{2}Li_{2}	lithium fluoride	12265–82–6
F_{2}Mg	magnesium fluoride	7783–40–6
F_{2}Mn	manganese difluoride	7782–64–1
F_{2}Mo	molybdenum difluoride	20205–60–1
F_{2}MoO_{2}	molybdenum difluoride dioxide	13824–57–2
F_{2}N	difluoroamino radical	3744–07–8
F_{2}N_{2}O	nitrosodifluoroamine	14984–78–2
F_{2}Na_{2}	disodium difluoride	12285–64–2
F_{2}Nd	neodymium difluoride	13940–76–6
F_{2}Ni	nickel difluoride	10028–18–9
F_{2}O	oxygen difluoride	7783–41–7
F_{2}OS	thionyl fluoride	7783–42–8
F_{2}OSi	difluorooxosilane	14041–22–6
F_{2}OTi	titanium fluoride oxide	13537–16–1
F_{2}O_{2}	perfluoroperoxide	7783–44–0
F_{2}O_{2}S	sulfuryl fluoride	2699–79–8
F_{2}O_{2}W	tungsten difluoride dioxide	14118–73–1
F_{2}O_{5}S_{3}	peroxydisulfuryl difluoride	
F_{2}P	phosphorus difluoride	13873–52–4
F_{2}Pb	lead difluoride	7783–46–2
F_{2}Pt	platinum difluoride	18820–56–9
F_{2}Pu	plutonium difluoride	20882–15–9
F_{2}S	sulfur difluoride	13814–25–0
F_{2}SW	tungsten difluoride monosulfide	41831–78–1
F_{2}S_{2}	difluorodisulfane thiothionyl fluoride	13709–35–8; 16860–99–4; 101947–30–2
F_{2}S_{2}W	tungsten difluoride disulfide	41831–81–6
F_{2}Sc	scandium difluoride	14017–34–6
F_{2}Se	selenium difluoride	70421–43–1
F_{2}Si	difluorosilylene	13966–66–0
F_{2}Sn	tin difluoride	7783–47–3
F_{2}Sr	strontium fluoride	7783–48–4
F_{2}Th	thorium difluoride	28844–11–3
F_{2}Ti	titanium difluoride	13814–20–5
F_{2}Tl_{2}	dithallium difluoride	31970–97–5
F_{2}W	tungsten difluoride	33963–15–4
F_{2}Xe	xenon difluoride	13709–36–9
F_{2}Y	yttrium difluoride	13981–89–0
F_{2}Zn	zinc difluoride	7783–49–5
F_{2}Zr	zirconium fluoride	13842–94–9
F_{3}Fe	iron trifluoride	7783–50–8
F_{3}Ga	gallium trifluoride	7783–51–9
F_{3}Gd	gadolinium trifluoride	13765–26–9
F_{3}Ho	holmium trifluoride	13760–78–6
F_{3}La	lanthanum trifluoride	13709–38–1
F_{3}Li_{3}	trilithium trifluoride	110682–19–4
F_{3}Lu	lutetium trifluoride	13760–81–1
F_{3}Mn	manganese trifluoride	7783–53–1
F_{3}Mo	molybdenum trifluoride	20193–58–2
F_{3}MoO	molybdenum trifluoride oxide	22529–29–9
F_{3}MoS	molybdenum trifluoride sulfide	67374–76–9
F_{3}N	nitrogen trifluoride	7783–54–2
F_{3}NO	nitrogen trifluoride oxide	13847–65–9
F_{3}NO_{2}S	difluoroaminosulfonyl fluoride	13709–30–3
F_{3}NO_{3}S	difluoraminooxysulfonyl fluoride	6816–12–2
F_{3}NS	thiazyl trifluoride	15930–75–3
F_{3}NaSn	sodium trifluorostannate	13782–22–4
F_{3}Nd	neodymium trifluoride	13709–42–7
F_{3}OP	phosphoryl fluoride	13478–20–1
F_{3}OTa	tantalum monoxide trifluoride	20263–47–2
F_{3}OV	vanadium trifluoride oxide	13709–31–4
F_{3}P	phosphorus trifluoride	7783–55–3
F_{3}PS	thiophosphoryl fluoride	2404–52–6
F_{3}Pr	praseodymium trifluoride	13709–46–1
F_{3}Pu	plutonium trifluoride	13842–83–6
F_{3}Rh	rhodium fluoride	60804–25–3
F_{3}S	sulfur trifluoride	30937–38–3
F_{3}SW	tungsten trifluoride monosulfide	41831–79–2
F_{3}Sb	antimony trifluoride	7783–56–4
F_{3}Sc	scandium fluoride	13709–47–2
F_{3}Si	trifluorosilyl radical	14835–14–4
F_{3}Sm	samarium trifluoride	13765–24–7
F_{3}Tb	terbium trifluoride	13708–63–9
F_{3}Th	thorium trifluoride	13842–84–7
F_{3}Ti	titanium trifluoride	13470–08–1
F_{3}Tl	thallium trifluoride	7783–57–5
F_{3}Tm	thulium trifluoride	13760–79–7
F_{3}W	tungsten trifluoride	51621–17–1
F_{3}Y	yttrium trifluoride	13709–49–4
F_{3}Yb	ytterbium trifluoride	13760–80–0
F_{3}Zr	zirconium trifluoride	13814–22–7
F_{4}Ge	germanium tetrafluoride	7783–58–6
F_{4}Ge_{2}	digermanium tetrafluoride	12332–08–0
F_{4}Hf	hafnium fluoride	13709–52–9
F_{4}Mg_{2}	dimagnesium tetrafluoride	56450–89–6
F_{4}Mg_{2}	magnesium fluoride	58790–41–3
F_{4}Mo	molybdenum tetrafluoride	23412–45–5
F_{4}MoO	molybdenum tetrafluoride oxide	14459–59–7
F_{4}MoS	molybdenum tetrafluoride monosulfide	70487–60–4
F_{4}N_{2}	tetrafluorohydrazine	10036–47–2
F_{4}Na_{2}Sn	disodium tetrafluorostannate	15007–55–3
F_{4}OOs	osmium oxide tetrafluoride	38448–58–7
F_{4}OP_{2}	diphosphorus tetrafluoride oxide	13812–07–2
F_{4}ORe	rhenium tetrafluoride oxide	17026–29–8
F_{4}OS	sulfur tetrafluoride oxide	13709–54–1
F_{4}OW	tungsten tetrafluoride oxide	13520–79–1
F_{4}OXe	xenon tetrafluoride oxide	13774–85–1
F_{4}P_{2}	diphosphorus tetrafluoride	13824–74–3
F_{4}Pb	lead tetrafluoride	7783–59–7
F_{4}Pt	platinum tetrafluoride	13455–15–7
F_{4}Pu	plutonium tetrafluoride	13709–56–3
F_{4}S	sulfur tetrafluoride	7783–60–0
F_{4}SW	tungsten tetrafluoride monosulfide	41831–80–5
F_{4}Se	selenium tetrafluoride	13465–66–2
F_{4}Si	silicon tetrafluoride	7783–61–1
F_{4}Sn_{2}	ditin tetrafluoride	130950–28–6
F_{4}Ti	titanium fluoride	7783–63–3
F_{4}U	uranium tetrafluoride	10049–14–6
F_{4}W	tungsten tetrafluoride	13766–47–7
F_{4}Xe	xenon tetrafluoride	13709–61–0
F_{4}Zr	zirconium tetrafluoride	7783–64–4
F_{5}I	iodine pentafluoride	7783–66–6
F_{5}Mo	molybdenum pentafluoride	13819–84–6
F_{5}ORe	rhenium monoxide pentafluoride	23377–53–9
F_{5}P	phosphorus pentafluoride	7647–19–0
F_{5}Pu	plutonium pentafluoride	31479–19–3
F_{5}S	disulfur decafluoride	10546–01–7
F_{5}Sb	antimony pentafluoride	7783–70–2
F_{5}Ta	tantalum pentafluoride	7783–71–3
F_{5}U	uranium pentafluoride	13775–07–0
F_{5}W	tungsten pentafluoride	19357–83–6
F_{6}Fe_{2}	diiron hexafluoride	17114–45–3
F_{6}La_{2}	lanthanum trifluoride dimer	12592–31–3
F_{6}Mo	molybdenum hexafluoride	7783–77–9
F_{6}NP_{3}	nitridotriphosphorous hexafluoride	56564–56–8
F_{6}Os	osmium hexafluoride	13768–38–2
F_{6}Pu	plutonium hexafluoride	13693–06–6
F_{6}Re	rhenium hexafluoride	10049–17–9
F_{6}S	sulfur hexafluoride	2551–62–4
F_{6}Se	selenium hexafluoride	7783–79–1
F_{6}Si_{2}	hexafluorodisilane	13830–68–7
F_{6}Sn_{3}	tritin hexafluoride	12324–60–6
F_{6}Te	tellurium hexafluoride	7783–80–4
F_{6}U	uranium hexafluoride	7783–81–5
F_{6}W	tungsten hexafluoride	7783–82–6
F_{6}Xe	xenon hexafluoride	13693–09–9
F_{7}I	iodine fluoride	16921–96–3
F_{7}NS	pentafluorosulfanyldifluoroamine	13693–10–2
F_{7}Re	rhenium heptafluoride	17029–21–9
F_{8}Si_{3}	octafluorotrisilane	14521–14–3
F_{10}Mo_{2}	molybdenum fluoride	65653–18–1
F_{10}S_{2}	sulfur fluoride	5714–22–7
F_{15}Mo_{3}	molybdenum fluoride	65653–05–6
FeAsS	iron arsenic sulfide arsenopyrite	1303–18–0
FeBr_{2}	iron(II) bromide	7789–46–0
FeBr_{3}	iron(III) bromide	10031–26–2
FeBr_{3} · 6H_{2}O	iron(III) bromide hexahydrate	
FeCO_{3}	siderite	14476–16–5
FeC_{2}O_{4}	iron oxalate	15843–42–2
FeC_{5}O_{5}	iron pentacarbonyl pentacarbonyl iron	13463–40–6
FeC_{10}H_{10}	ferrocene	102–54–5
FeCl_{2}	iron(II) chloride	7758–94–3
FeCl_{3}	iron(III) chloride	7705–08–0
FeCr_{2}O_{4}	chromite (ore)	1308–31–2
FeF_{2}	iron fluoride	41428–55–1
FeF_{2} · 4H_{2}O	iron(II) fluoride tetrahydrate	13940–89–1
FeI	iron monoiodide	33019–21–5
FeI_{2}	iron diiodide iron(II) iodide	7783–86–0
FeI_{2} · 4H_{2}O	iron(II) iodide tetrahydrate	13492–45–0
FeI_{3}	iron(III) iodide	15600–49–4
FeMoO_{4}	iron(II) orthomolybdate	13718–70–2
FeO	iron monoxide iron(II) oxide wüstite	1345–25–1
FeO_{2}	iron dioxide	12411–15–3
FeO_{2}H	goethite	1310–14–1
FeO_{2}H · nH_{2}O	limonite	1317–63–1
Fe(OH)_{2}	iron(II) hydroxide	18624–44–7
Fe(OH)_{3}	iron(III) hydroxide	11113–66–9
Fe(SCN)_{3}	iron(III) Thiocyanate	
FeO_{4}S	ferrous sulfate	7720–78–7
FeO_{4}Se	iron(II) selenate ferrous selenate	15857-43-9
FeO_{8}H_{4}P_{2}	iron(II) dihydrogen phosphate	
FeP	iron(III) phosphide	26508–33–8
FePO_{4}	iron(III) phosphate	58782–48–2
FeS	iron sulfide iron(II) sulfide	1317–96–0
Fe_{2}S_{3}	iron sulfide iron(III) silfide	1317–96–0
FeS_{2}	pyrite fool's gold	1309–36–0
FeS_{2}	iron(IV) sulfide marcasite	12068–85–8
FeSe	iron(II) selenide	1310–32–3
FeTe	iron(II) telluride	12125–63–2
FeTiO_{3}	iron(II) metatitanate	12022–71–8
FeTiO_{3}	ilmenite	12168–52–4
FeVO_{4}	iron(III) orthovanadate	
FeWO_{4}	iron(II) orthotungstate	13870–24–1
FeZrO_{3}	iron(II) metazirconate	
Fe_{2}I_{2}	diiron diiodide	92785–64–3
Fe_{2}I_{4}	diiron tetraiodide	92785–63–2
Fe_{2}O_{3}	iron oxide iron(III) oxide hematite	1317–60–8
Fe_{2}O_{3}	venetian red	8011–97–0
Fe_{2}O_{12}S_{3}	ferric sulfate iron(III) sulfate	10028–22–5
Fe_{2}O_{12}W_{3}	iron(III) orthotungstate	
Fe_{2}P	diiron phosphide	1310–43–6
Fe_{2}SiO_{4}	fayalite	13918–37–1
Fe_{3}H_{2}Na_{2}O_{45}Si	chrysotile white asbestos	12001–28–4
Fe_{3}O_{4}	iron(II,III) oxide magnetite triiron(II, III) tetraoxide	1309–38–2
Fe_{3}P	iron(tri) phosphide	12023–53–9
Fe_{4}(P_{2}O_{7})_{3}	iron(III) pyrophosphate	
Fe_{7}Si_{8}O_{24}H_{2}	amosite brown asbestos grunerite	12172–73–5

== G ==
Chemical formula	Synonyms	CAS number
GaAs	gallium(III) arsenide	1303–00–0
GaAsO_{4}	gallium(III) orthoarsenate	
GaBr_{3}	gallium(III) bromide	13450–88–9
Ga(C_{2}H_{3}O_{2})_{3}	gallium(III) acetate	2571–06–4
GaCl_{2}	gallium(II) chloride	128579–09–9
GaCl_{3}	gallium trichloride	13450–90–3
Ga(ClO_{4})_{3}	gallium(III) perchlorate	17835–81–3
GaI_{2}	gallium(II) iodide	
GaI_{3}	gallium(III) iodide	13450–91–4
GaN	gallium(III) nitride	25617–97–4
Ga(OH)_{3}	gallium(III) hydroxide	12023–99–3
GaPO_{4}	gallium(III) orthophosphate	
GaSb	gallium(III) antimonide	12064–03–8
GaTe	gallium(II) telluride	12024–14–5
Ga_{2}O_{3}	gallium(III) oxide	12024–21–4
Ga_{2}(SO_{4})_{3}·18H_{2}O	gallium(III) sulfate octadecahydrate	
Ga_{2}S_{3}	gallium(III) sulfide	12024–22–5
Ga_{2}Te_{3}	gallium(III) telluride	12024–27–0
GeBr_{4}	germanium(IV) bromide	13450–92–5
GeH_{3}COOH	2-germaacetic acid	
GeI_{2}	germanium(II) iodide	13573–08–5
GeI_{4}	germanium(IV) iodide	13450–95–8
GeO	germanium(II) oxide	20619–16–3

== H ==
Chemical formula	Synonyms	CAS number
HArF	argon fluorohydride	
HAt	hydrogen astatide	
HBr	hydrogen bromide hydrobromic acid	10035–10–6
HBrO	hypobromous acid	13517–11–8
HBrO_{2}	bromous acid	
HBrO_{3}	bromic acid	
HBrO_{4}	perbromic acid	
HCCH	acetylene ethyne	74–86–2
HCN	hydrocyanic acid hydrogen cyanide	6914–07–4
HCNO	fulminic acid	
HCONH_{2}	formamide methanamide	75–12–7
HCOO^{−}	formate ion	71–47–6
HCOOH	formic acid methanoic acid	64–18–6
HCOONH_{4}	ammonium formate	540–69–2
HCO_{3}^{−}	hydrogencarbonate ion	71–52–3
HC_{3}H_{5}O_{3}	lactic acid	50–21–5
HC_{5}H_{5}N^{+}	pyridinium ion	
HC_{6}H_{7}O_{6}	ascorbic acid	50–81–7
HC_{9}H_{7}O_{4}	acetylsalicylic acid	50–78–2
HC_{12}H_{17}ON_{4}SCl_{2}	thiamine hydrochloride vitamin B_{1} hydrochloride	67–03–8
HCl	hydrochloric acid hydrogen chloride	7647–01–0
HClO	hypochlorous acid	7790–92–3
HClO_{2}	chlorous acid	13898–47–0
HClO_{3}	chloric acid	7790–93–4
HClO_{4}	perchloric acid	7601–90–3
HDO	semiheavy water water-d1	14940–63–7
HF	hydrofluoric acid	7664–39–3
HI	hydroiodic acid	10034–85–2
HIO	hypoiodous acid	14332–21–9
HIO_{2}	iodous acid	
HIO_{3}	iodic acid	7782–68–5
HIO_{4}	periodic acid	13444–71–8
HNCO	isocyanic acid	
HNO	nitroxyl	14332–28–6
HNO_{2}	nitrous acid	7782–77–6
HNO_{3}	nitric acid hydrogen nitrate	7697–37–2
HN_{3}	hydrazoic acid	7782–79–8
HOBr	hypobromous acid	13517–11–8
HOCl	hypochlorous acid	7790–92–3
HOF	hypofluorous acid	14034–79–8
HOOCCOOH	oxalic acid	144–62–7
HPO_{4}^{2−}	hydrogenphosphate ion	14066–19–4
HSO_{3}^{−}	hydrogensulfite ion	15181–46–1
HSO_{4}^{−}	hydrogensulfate	12143–45–2
HTO	partially tritiated water water-t	13670–17–2
H_{2}	hydrogen	1333–74–0
H_{2}C(CH)CN	acrylonitrile	107–13–1
H_{2}CO	formaldehyde	19710–56–6
H_{2}CO_{3}	carbonic acid	107–32–4
H_{2}CSO	sulfine	40100–16–1
H_{2}C_{2}O_{4}	oxalic acid	144–62–7
H_{2}C_{4}H_{4}O_{6}	tartaric acid	87–69–4
H_{2}C_{8}H_{4}O_{4}	phthalic acid H_{2}Ph	
H_{2}CrO_{4}	chromic acid	7738–94–5
H_{2}NCH_{2}COOH	glycine	56–40–6
H_{2}N_{2}O_{2}	hyponitrous acid	14448–38–5
H_{2}NNH_{2}	hydrazine	302–01–2
H_{2}O	water	7732–18–5
H_{2}O_{2}	hydrogen peroxide	7722–84–1
H_{2}O_{2}Si	Oxosilanol	59313-55-2
H_{2}PO_{4}^{−}	dihydrogen phosphate ion	14066–20–7
H_{2}S	hydrogen sulfide hydrosulfuric acid	7783–06–4
H_{2}SO_{3}	sulfurous acid	7782–99–2
H_{2}SO_{4}	sulfuric acid hydrogen sulfate	7664–93–9
H_{2}S_{2}O_{2}	thiosulfurous acid	
H_{2}S_{2}O_{3}	thiosulfuric acid	13686–28–7
H_{2}S_{2}O_{4}	dithionous acid	15959–26–9
H_{2}S_{2}O_{5}	disulfurous acid	
H_{2}S_{2}O_{6}	dithionic acid	14970–71–9
H_{2}S_{2}O_{7}	disulfuric acid	8014–95–7
H_{2}S_{2}O_{8}	peroxydisulfuric acid	13445–49–3
H_{2}SeO_{3}	selenous acid	7783–00–8
H_{2}SeO_{4}	selenic acid	7783–08–6
H_{2}SiO_{3}	silicic acid	7699–41–4
H_{2}TeO_{3}	tellurous acid	10049–23–7
H_{2}TiO_{3}	titanic acid	
H_{3}AsO_{4}	arsenic acid	7778–39–4
H_{3}CCH_{2}CH_{3}	propane	74–98–6
H_{3}N^{+}CH_{2}COO^{−}	glycine zwitterion	
H_{3}O^{+}	hydronium ion	13968–08–6
H_{3}PO_{2}	hypophosphorous acid	
H_{3}PO_{3}	phosphorous acid	
H_{3}PO_{4}	phosphoric acid	7664–38–2
H_{4}XeO_{6}	perxenic acid	
H_{6}TeO_{6}	telluric acid	7803–68–1
HfBr_{4}	hafnium(IV) bromide	13777–22–5
HfF_{4}	hafnium(IV) fluoride	13709–52–9
HfOCl_{2} · 8H_{2}O	hafnium(IV) oxychloride octahydrate	14456–34–9
HfOH(C_{2}H_{3}O_{2})_{3}	hafnium(IV) acetate, basic	
Hf(SO_{4})_{2}	hafnium(IV) sulfate	15823–43–5
Hg(BrO_{3})_{2}·2H_{2}O	mercury(II) bromate dihydrate	
Hg_{2}Br_{2}	mercury(I) bromide	10031–18–2
HgBr_{2}	mercury(II) bromide	7789–47–1
Hg(C_{2}H_{3}O_{2})_{2}	mercury(II) acetate	1600–27–7
Hg(C_{7}H_{5}O_{2})_{2}·H_{2}O	mercury(II) benzoate monohydrate	
HgClO_{4}·4H_{2}O	mercury(I) perchlorate tetrahydrate	
Hg(ClO_{4})_{2}·3H_{2}O	mercury(II) perchlorate trihydrate	
HgCl_{2}	mercury(II) chloride	7487–94–7
Hg(IO_{3})_{2}	mercury(II) iodate	7783–32–6
HgI_{2}	mercury(II) iodide	7774–29–0
Hg(NO_{3})_{2}·H_{2}O	mercury(II) nitrate monohydrate	7783–34–8
Hg(CNO)_{2}	mercury(II) fulminate	628–86–4
HgNa	sodium amalgam	
HgO	mercury(II) oxide	21908–53–2
Hg(OH)_{2}	mercury(II) hydroxide	
HgS	mercury(II) sulfide cinnabar	1344–48–5
Hg(SCN)_{2}	mercury(II) thiocyanate	592–85–8
HgSe	mercury(II) selenide	20601–83–6
HgSeO_{3}	mercury(II) selenite	
HgTe	mercury(II) telluride	12068–90–5
HgTeO_{3}	mercury(II) tellurite	
HgWO_{4}	mercury(II) tungstate	37913–38–5
Hg_{2}Br_{2}	mercury(I) bromide	15385–58–7
Hg_{2}Cl_{2}	mercury(I) chloride	10112–91–1
Hg_{2}I_{2}	mercury(I) iodide	15385–57–6
Hg_{3}(AsO_{4})_{2}	mercury(II) orthoarsenate	7784–37–4
Hg_{3}(PO_{4})_{2}	mercury(II) phosphate	7782–66–3

== I ==
Chemical formula	Synonyms	CAS number
IBr	iodine monobromide	7789–33–5
IBr_{3}	iodine tribromide	7789–58–4
ICl	Iodine monochloride	7790–99–0
ICl_{3}	iodine(III) chloride	865–44–1
IO_{3}	trioxidoiodine	
IO_{3}^{−}	iodate ion	15454–31–6
I_{2}	iodine	7553–56–2
I^{−}	iodide ion	20461-54-5
I_{3}^{−}	triiodide ion	14900–04–0
I_{5}^{−}	pentaiodide ion	22318-17-8
I_{2}O_{5}	iodine pentoxide	12029–98–0
InAs	indium(III) arsenide	1303–11–3
InBr	indium(I) bromide	14280–53–6
InBrI_{2}	indium(III) bromodiiodide	
InBr_{2}I	indium(III) dibromoiodide	
InBr_{3}	indium(III) bromide	13465–09–3
InCl	indium(I) chloride	13465–10–6
InCl_{2}	indium(II) chloride	
InCl_{3}	indium(III) chloride	10025–82–8
InCl_{3}·4H_{2}O	indium(III) chloride tetrahydrate	22519–64–8
InI	indium(I) iodide	13966–94–4
In(IO_{3})_{3}	indium(III) iodate	
InI_{2}	indium(II) iodide	
InI_{3}	indium(III) iodide	13510–35–5
In(NO_{3})_{3}·4.5H_{2}O	indium(III) nitrate tetrahemihydrate	
In(OH)_{3}	indium(III) hydroxide	20661–21–6
InP	indium(III) phosphide	22398–80–7
InPO_{4}	indium(III) orthophosphate	14693–82–4
InS	indium(II) sulfide	12030–14–7
InSb	indium(III) antimonide	1312–41–0
InTe	indium(II) telluride	12030–19–2
In_{2}O_{3}	indium(III) oxide	1312–43–2
In_{2}(SO_{4})_{3}·H_{2}O	indium(III) sulfate monohydrate	304655–87–6
In_{2}S_{3}	indium(III) sulfide	12030–24–9
In_{2}Se_{3}	indium(III) selenide	12056–07–4
In_{2}Te_{3}	indium(III) telluride	1312–45–4
IrBr_{3}	iridium(III) bromide	10049–24–8

== K ==
Chemical formula	Synonyms	CAS number
KAl(SO_{4})_{2}	potassium alum	10043–67–1
KAsO_{2}	potassium arsenite	10124-50-2
KH_{2}AsO_{4}	potassium dihydrogen arsenate	
KBr	potassium bromide	7758–02–3
KBrO	potassium hypobromite	
KBrO_{2}	potassium bromite	
KBrO_{3}	potassium bromate	7758–01–2
KBrO_{4}	potassium perbromate	22207–96–1
KCN	potassium cyanide	151–50–8
KCNO	potassium cyanate	590-28-3
KCNO	potassium fulminate	15736-99-9
KCNS	potassium thiocyanate	333–20–0
KCl	potassium chloride	7447–40–7
KClO	potassium hypochlorite	7778–66–7
KClO_{2}	potassium chlorite	14314–27–3
KClO_{3}	potassium chlorate	3811–04–9
KClO_{4}	potassium perchlorate	7778–74–7
K_{2}CrO_{4}	potassium chromate	7789–00–6
K_{2}Cr_{2}O_{7}	potassium dichromate	7778–50–9
K_{2}HAsO_{4}	dipotassium hydrogen arsenate	
K_{2}HPO_{3}	dipotassium phosphite	
K_{2}HPO_{4}	dipotassium phosphate	7758–11–4
K_{3}AsO_{4}	potassium arsenate	13464–36–3
K_{3}C_{6}H_{5}O_{7}	potassium citrate	866–84–2
K_{3}PO_{3}	tripotassium phosphite	
K_{3}PO_{4}	tripotassium phosphate	7778–53–2
KF	potassium fluoride	13455–21–1
KOF	potassium hypofluorite	
KH	potassium hydride	7693-26-7
KHCO_{3}	potassium bicarbonate	298–14–6
KHS	potassium hydrosulfide	1310-61-8
KHSO_{3}	potassium bisulfite	7773–03–7
KHSO_{4}	potassium bisulfate	7646–93–7
KH_{2}PO_{3}	monopotassium phosphite	
KH_{2}PO_{4}	monopotassium phosphate	
KI	potassium iodide	7681–11–0
KIO	potassium hypoiodite	
KIO_{2}	potassium iodite	
KIO_{3}	potassium iodate	7758-05-6
KIO_{4}	potassium periodate	7790–21–8
KMnO_{4}	potassium permanganate	7722–64–7
KNO_{3}	potassium nitrate	7757–79–1
KNO_{2}	potassium nitrite	7758–09–0
K_{2}CO_{3}	potassium carbonate	584–08–7
K_{2}MnO_{4}	potassium manganate	10294–64–1
K_{2}N_{2}O_{2}	potassium hyponitrite	
KNbO_{3}	potassium niobate	12030–85–2
K_{2}O	potassium oxide	12136–45–7
K_{2}O_{2}	potassium peroxide	17014–71–0
K_{2}S	potassium sulfide	1312–73–8
K_{2}S_{2}O_{3}	potassium thiosulfate	10294–66–3
K_{2}S_{2}O_{5}	potassium metabisulfite	16731–55–8
K_{2}S_{2}O_{8}	potassium persulfate	7727–21–1
K_{2}SO_{3}	potassium sulfite	16731–55–8
K_{2}SO_{4}	potassium sulfate	7778–80–5
KOH	potassium hydroxide/caustic potash	1310–58–3

== L ==
Chemical formula	Synonyms	CAS number
LaBr_{3}	lanthanum(III) bromide	13536-79-3
LaCl_{3}	lanthanum(III) chloride	10099–58–8
LaI_{3}	lanthanum(III) iodide	13813-22-4
La_{2}O_{3}	lanthanum(III) oxide	1312-81-8
La(OH)_{3}	lanthanum hydroxide	14507-19-8
LaPO_{4}	lanthanum(III) phosphate	14913–14–5
LaPO_{4}·0.5H_{2}O	lanthanum(III) phosphate crystal hemihydrate	
LiAlH_{4}	lithium aluminium hydride	16853-85-3
Li(AlSi_{2}O_{6})	keatite	
C_{6}H_{7}LiO_{6}	lithium ascorbate	80781-74-4
LiBH_{4}	lithium borohydride	16949-15-8
LiBr	lithium bromide	7550–35–8
LiBr·2H_{2}O	lithium bromide dihydrate	
LiBrO	lithium hypobromite	
LiBrO_{2}	lithium bromite	
LiBrO_{3}	lithium bromate	13550–28–2
LiBrO_{4}	lithium perbromate	
LiCl	lithium chloride	7447–41–8
LiClO	lithium hypochlorite	13840–33–0
LiClO_{2}	lithium chlorite	
LiClO_{3}	lithium chlorate	13453–71–9
LiClO_{4}	lithium perchlorate	7791–03–9
LiCN	lithium cyanide	2408–36–8
LiCNO	lithium cyanate	2363-79-3
LiC_{2}H_{5}O	lithium ethoxide	2388–07–0
LiF	lithium fluoride	7789–24–4
LiH	lithium hydride	7580-67-8
LiHCO_{3}	lithium bicarbonate	5006–97–3
LiHS	lithium hydrosulfide	
LiHSO_{3}	lithium bisulfite	
LiHSO_{4}	lithium hydrogen sulfate	13453–86–6
LiH_{2}AsO_{4}	lithium dihydrogen arsenate	
LiH_{2}PO_{3}	monolithium phosphite	
LiH_{2}PO_{4}	monolithium phosphate	
LiI	lithium iodide	10377–51–2
LiIO	lithium hypoiodite	
LiIO_{2}	lithium iodite	
LiIO_{3}	lithium iodate	13765–03–2
LiIO_{4}	lithium periodate	21111-84-2
LiNa	lithium sodium	
LiNaNO_{2}	lithium sodium nitroxylate	
LiNbO_{3}	lithium niobate	12031-63-9
LiNO_{2}	lithium nitrite	13568–33–7
LiNO_{3}	lithium nitrate	7790–69–4
LiNO_{3}·H_{2}O	lithium nitrate monohydrate	
LiOH	lithium hydroxide	1310–65–2
LiTaO_{3}	lithium tantalate lithium metatantalate	12031–66–2
LiVO_{3}·2H_{2}O	lithium metavanadate dihydrate	
Li_{2}HAsO_{4}	dilithium hydrogen arsenate	
Li_{2}B_{4}O_{7}·5H_{2}O	lithium tetraborate pentahydrate	1303–94–2
Li_{2}CO_{3}	lithium carbonate	554–13–2
Li_{2}CrO_{4}	lithium chromate	14307–35–8
Li_{2}CrO_{4}·2H_{2}O	lithium chromate dihydrate	7789–01–7
Li_{2}Cr_{2}O_{7}	lithium dichromate	13843–81–7
Li_{2}HPO_{3}	dilithium phosphite	
Li_{2}HPO_{4}	dilithium phosphate	
Li_{2}MoO_{4}	lithium molybdate	13568–40–6
Li_{2}MoO_{4}	lithium orthomolybdate	13568–40–6
Li_{2}NbO_{3}	lithium metaniobate	12031–63–9
Li_{2}N_{2}O_{2}	lithium hyponitrite	
Li_{2}O	lithium oxide	12057–24–8
Li_{2}O_{2}	lithium peroxide	12031–80–0
Li_{2}S	lithium sulfide	12136–58–2
Li_{2}SO_{3}	lithium sulfite	13453–87–7
Li_{2}SO_{4}	lithium sulfate	10377–48–7
Li_{2}SeO_{3}	lithium selenite	15593–51–8
Li_{2}SeO_{4}	lithium selenate	15593–52–9
Li_{2}SiO_{3}	lithium metasilicate	10102–24–6
Li_{2}SiO_{3}	lithium orthosilicate	63985–45–5
Li_{2}TeO_{3}	lithium tellurite	14929–69–2
Li_{2}TeO_{4}	lithium tellurate	15851–53–3
Li_{2}TiO_{3}	lithium titanate	12031–82–2
Li_{2}TiO_{3}	lithium metatitanate	12031–82–2
Li_{2}WO_{4}	lithium tungstate	13568–45–1
Li_{2}WO_{4}	lithium orthotungstate	13568–45–1
Li_{2}ZrO_{3}	lithium metazirconate	
Li_{3}AsO_{4}	trilithium arsenate	
Li_{3}PO_{3}	trilithium phosphite	
Li_{3}PO_{4}	trilithium phosphate	

== M ==
Chemical formula	Synonyms	CAS number
MgBr_{2}	magnesium bromide	7789–48–2
Mg(BrO)_{2}	magnesium hypobromite	
Mg(BrO_{2})_{2}	magnesium bromite	
Mg(BrO_{3})_{2}	magnesium bromate	
Mg(BrO_{4})_{2}	magnesium perbromate	
Mg(AlO_{2})_{2}	magnesium aluminate	12068–51–8
As_{2}Mg_{3}	magnesium arsenide	12044–49–4
MgCO_{3}	magnesium carbonate magnesite	546–93–0
MgC_{2}O_{4}	magnesium oxalate	547–66–0
Mg(ClO)_{2}	magnesium hypochlorite	10233–03–1
Mg(ClO_{2})_{2}	magnesium chlorite	
Mg(ClO_{3})_{2}	magnesium chlorate	10326–21–3
Mg(ClO_{3})_{2}·xH_{2}O	magnesium chlorate hydrate	
Mg(ClO_{4})_{2}	magnesium perchlorate	10034–81–8
MgCl_{2}	magnesium chloride	7786–30–3
MgCrO_{4}	magnesium chromate	13423–61–5
MgCrO_{4}·5H_{2}O	magnesium chromate pentahydrate	
MgF_{2}	magnesium fluoride	7783–40–6
MgHPO_{4}	dimagnesium phosphate	7757-86-0
MgI_{2}	magnesium iodide	10377–58–9
Mg(IO)_{2}	magnesium hypoiodite	
Mg(IO_{2})_{2}	magnesium iodite	
Mg(IO_{3})_{2}	magnesium iodate	
Mg(IO_{4})_{2}	magnesium periodate	
MgMoO_{4}	magnesium molybdate	13767–03–8
MgNH_{4}PO_{4}·6H_{2}O	magnesium ammonium phosphate hexahydrate	15490–91–2
Mg(NO_{2})_{2}	magnesium nitrite	
Mg(NO_{3})_{2}	magnesium nitrate	10377–60–3
Mg(NO_{3})_{2}·6H_{2}O	magnesium nitrate hexahydrate	13446–18–9
MgNaAl_{5}(Si_{4}O_{10})_{3}(OH)_{6}	montmorillonite (clay)	1318–93–0
MgO	magnesium oxide magnesia periclase	1309–48–4
Mg(OH)_{2}	magnesium hydroxide milk of magnesia	1309–42–8
MgPo	magnesium polonide	
MgS	magnesium sulfide	12032–36–9
MgSO_{3}	magnesium sulfite	7757–88–2
MgSO_{4}	magnesium sulfate	7487–88–9
MgSe	magnesium selenide	1313–04–8
MgSeO_{3}	magnesium selenite	15593–61–0
MgSeO_{4}	magnesium selenate	14986–91–5
MgSiO_{3}	magnesium metasilicate enstatite	13776–74–4
MgTiO_{3}	magnesium metatitanate	12032–30–3
Mg(VO_{3})_{2}	magnesium metavanadate	
MgWO_{4}	magnesium tungstate	13573–11–0
Mg_{2}Al(AlSiO_{5})(OH)_{4}	amesite	
Mg_{2}P_{2}O_{7}	magnesium pyrophosphate	13446–24–7
Mg_{2}SiO_{4}	forsterite	10034–94–3
Mg_{3}As_{2}	magnesium arsenide	12044–49–4
Mg_{3}Bi_{2}	magnesium bismuthide	12048–46–3
Mg_{3}P_{2}	magnesium phosphide	12057–74–8
Mg_{3}(Si_{2}O_{5})(OH)_{4}	chrysotile	12001–29–5
Mg_{3}(Si_{4}O_{10})(OH)_{2}	talc	14807–96–6
Mg_{3}(VO_{4})_{2}	magnesium orthovanadate	
MnAs	manganese(III) arsenide	
MnBi	manganese(III) bismuthide	
MnBr_{2}	manganese(II) bromide	13446–03–2
MnBr_{2}·4H_{2}O	manganese(II) bromide tetrahydrate	10031–20–6
Mn(CHO_{2})_{2}	manganese(II) formate	3251–96–5
Mn(CHO_{2})_{2}·2H_{2}O	manganese(II) formate dihydrate	4247–36–3
MnCO_{3}	manganese(II) carbonate	598–62–9
MnCl_{2}	manganese(II) chloride	7773–01–5
MnF_{2}	manganese(II) fluoride	7782–64–1
MnI_{2}	manganese(II) iodide	7790–33–2
MnMoO_{4}	manganese(II) orthomolybdate	
Mn(NO_{3})_{2}	manganese(II) nitrate	10377–66–9
Mn(NO_{3})_{2}·4H_{2}O	manganese(II) nitrate tetrahydrate	20694–39–7
MnO	manganese(II) oxide	1344–43–0
Mn(OH)_{2}	manganese hydroxide	1310–97–0
MnOOH	manganite	1310–98–1
MnO_{2}	manganese dioxide pyrolusite	1313–13–9
MnO_{4}^{−}	permanganate ion	14333–13–2
MnPb_{8}(Si_{2}O_{7})_{3}	barysilate	
MnS	manganese sulfide	18820–29–6
MnTe	manganese(II) telluride	12032–88–1
MnZrO_{3}	manganese(II) metazirconate	
Mn_{2}O_{3}	manganese(III) oxide	1317–34–6
Mn_{3}As_{2}	manganese(II) arsenide	
Mn_{3}O_{4}	manganese(II,III) oxide trimanganese tetroxide hausmannite	1317–35–7
Mn_{3}P_{2}	manganese(II) phosphide	
Mn_{3}Sb_{2}	manganese(II) antimonide	
MoBr_{2}	molybdenum(II) bromide	13446–56–5
MoBr_{3}	molybdenum(III) bromide	13446–57–6
MoCl_{2}	molybdenum(II) chloride	13478–17–6
MoCl_{3}	molybdenum(III) chloride	13478–18–7
MoCl_{5}	molybdenum(V) chloride	10241–05–1
MoO_{2}	molybdenum(IV) oxide	18868–43–4
MoO_{3}	Molybdenum trioxide	1313–27–5
MoO_{4}^{2−}	molybdate ion	14259–85–9
MoSe_{2}	molybdenum(IV) selenide	12058–18–3
MoS_{2}	molybdenum sulfide molybdenum disulfide molybdenite	1317–33–5

== N ==
Chemical formula	Synonyms	CAS number
NCl_{3}	nitrogen trichloride	10025–85–1
NHCl_{2}	dichloramine	3400-09-7
NH_{2}Cl	monochloramine	10599-90-3
NH_{2}^{−}	amide ion	17655–31–1
NH_{2}CH_{2}CH_{2}NH_{2}	ethylenediamine	107–15–3
NH_{2}CH_{2}CN	aminoacetonitrile	540-61-4
NH_{2}COOH	carbamic acid	463-77-4
NH_{2}CONH_{2}	urea	57–13–6
NH_{2}C_{6}H_{4}SO_{3}H	sulfanilic Acid	121–57–3
NH_{2}OH	hydroxylamine	7803–49–8
(NH_{2})_{2}CO	urea	57–13–6
(NH_{2})_{2}CO·HClO_{4}	urea perchlorate	18727-07-6
NH_{3}	ammonia	7664–41–7
NH_{4}^{+}	ammonium ion	14798–03–9
(NH_{4})_{3}N	ammonium nitride	
NH_{4}Br	ammonium bromide	12124–97–9
NH_{4}CO_{2}NH_{2}	ammonium carbamate	1111–78–0
(NH_{4})_{2}CO_{3}	ammonium carbonate	506–87–6
NH_{4}Cl	ammonium chloride	12125–02–9
NH_{4}ClO_{4}	Ammonium perchlorate	7790–98–9
NH_{4}HS	ammonium hydrosulfide	12124–99–1
(NH_{4})H_{2}AsO_{4}	ammonium dihydrogen arsenate	13462–93–6
NH_{4}NO_{3}	ammonium nitrate	6484–52–2
NH_{4}OCONH_{2}	ammonium carbamate	1111–78–0
NH_{4}OH	ammonium hydroxide	1336-21-6
(NH_{4})_{2}Ce(NO_{3})_{6}	ammonium cerium(IV) nitrate ceric ammonium nitrate CAN	16774–21–3
(NH_{4})_{3}PO_{4}	ammonium phosphate	7783–28–0
(NH_{4})_{2}CrO_{4}	ammonium chromate	7788–98–9
(NH_{4})_{2}Hg(SCN)_{4}	mercury(II) ammonium thiocyanate	
(NH_{4})_{2}[PtCl_{6}]	ammonium hexachloroplatinate(IV)	16919–58–7
(NH_{4})_{2}[Pt(SCN)_{6}]	ammonium hexathiocyanoplatinate(IV)	19372–45–3
(NH_{4})_{2}SO_{4}	ammonium sulfate	7783–20–2
NI_{3}	nitrogen triiodide	13444–85–4
NO	nitric oxide nitrogen oxide nitrogen(II) oxide	10102–43–9
NOCl	nitrosyl chloride	2696-92-6
NOBr	nitrosyl bromide	13444-87-6
NOI	nitrosyl iodide	
NO_{2}	nitrogen dioxide nitrogen(IV) oxide	10102–44–0
NO_{2}^{−}	nitrite ion	14797–65–0
NO_{2}Cl	nitryl chloride	13444–90–1
NO_{3}^{−}	nitrate ion	14797–55–8
NO_{4}^{−}	peroxynitrate ion	
N_{2}	nitrogen	7727–37–9
N_{2}H_{2}	diazene	3618–05–1
N_{2}H_{4}	hydrazine	302–01–2
N_{2}O	nitrous oxide dinitrogen oxide nitrogen(I) oxide	10024–97–2
N_{2}O_{3}	dinitrogen trioxide nitrogen(III) oxide	10544–73–7
N_{2}O_{4}	dinitrogen tetroxide nitrogen(IV) oxide	10544–72–6
N_{2}O_{5}	dinitrogen pentaoxide nitrogen(V) oxide	10102–03–1
N_{3}^{−}	azide ion	14343-69-2
N_{4}H_{4}	trans-tetrazene	54410–57–0
NaAlSi_{3}O_{3}	albite	
NaAsO_{2}	sodium metaarsenite	7784–46–5
NaH_{2}AsO_{4}	sodium dihydrogen arsenate	10103-60-3
NaAu(CN)_{2}	sodium dicyanoaurate(I)	15280–09–8
Na_{2}Cr_{2}O_{7}·2H_{2}O	Sodium dichromate dihydrate	10588–01–9
Na[B(NO_{3})_{4}]	sodium tetranitratoborate(III)	
NaBr	sodium bromide	7647–15–6
NaBrO	sodium hypobromite	13824-96-9
NaBrO_{2}	sodium bromite	7486-26-2
NaBrO_{3}	sodium bromate	7789-38-0
NaBrO_{4}	sodium perbromate	33497-30-2
NaCN	sodium cyanide	143–33–9
NaCNO	sodium fulminate	15736-98-8
NaC_{6}F_{5}COO	pentafluorobenzoate	
NaC_{6}H_{5}COO	sodium benzoate	532–32–1
NaC_{6}H_{7}O_{7}	monosodium citrate	18996–35–5
NaCa_{2}(Al_{5}Si_{5}O_{20})·6H_{2}O	thomsonite	
NaCl	sodium chloride rock-salt halite	7647–14–5
NaClO_{2}	sodium chlorite	7758–19–2
NaClO_{3}	sodium chlorate	7775–09–9
NaClO_{4}	sodium perchlorate	7601–89–0
NaF	sodium fluoride	7681–49–4
NaOF	sodium hypofluorite	
NaH	sodium hydride	7646–69–7
NaHCOO	sodium formate	141–53–7
NaHCO_{3}	sodium bicarbonate baking soda	144–55–8
NaHS	sodium hydrosulfide	
NaHSO_{3}	sodium bisulfite	7631–90–5
NaHSO_{4}	sodium bisulfate	7681–38–1
NaH_{2}PO_{3}	monosodium phosphite	
NaH_{2}PO_{4}	monosodium phosphate	
NaI	sodium iodide	7681–82–5
NaIO	sodium hypoiodite	
NaIO_{2}	sodium iodite	
NaIO_{3}	sodium iodate	
NaIO_{4}	sodium periodate	
NaNH_{2}C_{6}H_{4}SO_{3}	sodium sulfanilate	515–74–2
NaNO_{2}	sodium nitrite	7632–00–0
NaNO_{3}	sodium nitrate	7631–99–4
NaNbO_{3}	sodium metaniobate	
NaNbO_{3}·7H_{2}O	sodium metaniobate heptahydrate	
NaOCl	sodium hypochlorite	7681–52–9
NaOCN	sodium cyanate	917-61-3
NaOH	sodium hydroxide	1310–73–2
NaO_{2}As(CH_{3})_{2}·3H_{2}O	sodium salt of cacodylic acid	124–65–2
NaSeO_{3}	sodium selenite	
NaTaO_{3}	sodium metatantalate	
NaVO_{3}	sodium metavanadate	13718–26–8
Na_{2}CO_{3}	sodium carbonate soda ash	497–19–8
Na_{2}C_{2}O_{4}	sodium oxalate	62–76–0
Na_{2}C_{6}H_{6}O_{7}	disodium citrate	144–33–2
Na_{2}HAsO_{4}	disodium hydrogen arsenate	
Na_{2}HPO_{3}	disodium phosphite	
Na_{2}HPO_{4}	disodium phosphate	
Na_{2}MoS_{4}	sodium thiomolybdate	18198–15–7
Na_{2}N_{2}O_{2}	sodium hyponitrite	
Na_{2}O_{2}	sodium peroxide	1313–60–6
Na_{2}O	sodium oxide	1313–59–3
Na_{2}S	sodium monosulfide	1313–82–2
Na_{2}SO_{3}	sodium sulfite	7757–83–7
Na_{2}SO_{4}	sodium sulfate salt cake	7757–82–6
Na_{2}S_{2}O_{3}	sodium thiosulfate	7772–98–7
Na_{2}S_{2}O_{5}	sodium disulfite	7681–57–4
Na_{2}S_{2}O_{8}	sodium persulfate	7775–27–1
Na_{2}S_{4}	sodium tetrasulfide	12034–39–8
Na_{2}SeO_{3}	sodium selenite	10102–18–8
Na_{2}SeO_{4}	sodium selenate	13410–01–0
Na_{2}TeO_{3}	sodium tellurite	10102–20–2
Na_{2}TeO_{4}	sodium tellurate	
Na_{2}TiO_{3}	sodium metatitanate	
Na_{2}U_{2}O_{7}	sodium diuranate	13721-34-1
Na_{2}Zn(OH)_{4}	sodium zincate	12179–14–5
Na_{2}ZnO_{2}	sodium zincate	37224–32–1
Na_{2}ZrO_{3}	sodium metazirconate	
Na_{3}AlF_{6}	cryolite	15096–52–3
Na_{3}AsO_{4}	sodium arsenate	
Na_{3}[Co(CO_{3})_{3}]	sodium tricarbonatocobaltate(III)	
Na_{3}VO_{4}	sodium orthovanadate	13721–39–6
Na_{3}C_{6}H_{5}O_{7}	trisodium citrate	
Na_{3}PO_{3}	trisodium phosphite	
Na_{3}PO_{4}	trisodium phosphate	
Na_{4}V_{2}O_{7}	sodium pyrovanadate	13517–26–5
NbBr_{5}	niobium(V) bromide	13478–45–0
NbCl_{3}	niobium(III) chloride	13569–59–0
NbCl_{5}	niobium(V) chloride	10026–12–7
NbI_{5}	niobium(V) iodide	13779–92–5
Nb_{2}O_{3}	niobium(III) oxide	
NdAsO_{4}	Neodymium arsenate	
Nd(CH_{3}COO)_{3}	neodymium acetate	6192–13–8
NdCl_{2}	neodymium(II) chloride neodymium dichloride	25469–93–6
NdI_{2}	neodymium(II) iodide neodymium diiodide	61393–36–0
NdI_{3}	neodymium(III) iodide neodymium triiodide	13813–24–6
Nd(OH)_{3}	neodymium hydroxide	16469–17–3
Nd_{2}O_{3}	neodymium(III) oxide dineodymium trioxide	1313–97–9
NiAs	nickel(III) arsenide	27016–75–7
NiAsS	nickel arsenic sulfide gersdorffite	12255–10–6
NiBr_{2}	nickel(II) bromide	13462–88–9
NiBr_{2}·3H_{2}O	nickel(II) bromide trihydrate	7789–49–3
NiBr_{2}·6H_{2}O	nickel(II) bromide hexahydrate	
Ni(CO)_{3}	nickel(II) carbonate	
Ni(CO)_{4}	nickel tetracarbonyl	13463–39–3
NiC_{2}O_{4}·2H_{2}O	nickel(II) oxalate dihydrate	6018–94–6
NiCl_{2}	nickel(II) chloride	7718–54–9
NiFe_{2}O_{4}	nickel(II) iron(III) oxide	
NiI_{2}	nickel(II) iodide	13462–90–3
Ni(H_{2}PO)_{2}·6H_{2}O	nickel(II) hypophosphite hexahydrate	
NiMoO_{4}	nickel(II) orthomolybdate	
Ni(NO_{3})_{2}·6H_{2}O	nickel(II) nitrate hexahydrate	13478–00–7
NiOOH	nickel oxo-hydroxide	
NiO	nickel(II) oxide	1313–99–1
Ni(OH)_{2}	nickel(II) hydroxide	12054–48–7
NiS	nickel(II) sulfide millerite	16812–54–7
NiSO_{4}	nickel sulfate	7786–81–4
NiS_{2}	nickel sulfide	12035–51–7
NiSb	nickel antimonide	
NiSe	nickel(II) selenide	12201–85–3
NiTiO_{3}	nickel(II) metatitanate	
Ni(VO_{3})_{2}	nickel(II) metavanadate	
NiWO_{4}	nickel(II) orthotungstate	
Ni_{2}SiO_{4}	nickel(II) orthosilicate	
Ni_{3}(PO_{4})_{2}	nickel(II) orthophosphate	14396–43–1
Ni_{3}Sb_{2}	nickel(II) antimonide	

== O ==
Chemical formula	Synonyms	CAS number
O	oxygen	7782–44–7
OV	vanadium(II) oxide	
O_{2}	dioxygen	7782–44–7
O_{2}^{−}	superoxide ion	11062–77–4
O_{2}^{2−}	peroxide ion	14915–07–2
OF_{2}	oxygen difluoride	7783–41–7
O_{2}F_{2}	dioxygen difluoride	7783–44–0
O_{2}Ti	titanium dioxide	
O_{_{2}}U	uranium oxide	
OH^{−}	hydroxide ion	14280–30–9
O_{3}	ozone	10028–15–6
O_{3}^{−}	ozonide ion	12596–80–4
O_{3}U	uranium trioxide	
OPN	phosphoryl nitride	

== P ==
Chemical formula	Synonyms	CAS number
PCl_{3}	phosphorus trichloride	7719–12–2
PCl_{5}	phosphorus pentachloride	10026–13–8
POCl_{3}	phosphoryl chloride	10025–87–3
P_{2}I_{4}	diphosphorus tetraiodide	13455–00–0
P_{2}O_{5}	phosphorus pentoxide	1314–56–3
P_{2}S_{3}	diphosphorus trisulfide	12165–69–4
P_{2}Se_{3}	diphosphorus triselenide	1314–81–4
P_{3}N_{5}	triphosphorus pentanitride	12136–91–3
PH_{3}	phosphine	7803–51–2
POCl_{3}	phosphoryl chloride	10025–87–3
PbCl_{2}	lead(II) chloride	7758–95–4
PbCl_{4}	lead(IV) chloride	13463–30–4
PbHAsO_{4}	lead hydrogen arsenate	7784–40–9
PbI_{2}	lead(II) iodide	10101–63–0
Pb(IO_{3})_{2}	lead(II) iodate	25659–31–8
Pb(N_{3})_{2}	lead(II) nitride	
Pb(NO_{3})_{2}	lead(II) nitrate	10099–74–8
Pb(OH)_{2}	lead(II) hydroxide	19783–14–3
Pb(OH)_{4}	lead(IV) hydroxide	
PbC_{2}O_{4}	lead oxalate	814–93–7
PbCO_{3}	lead carbonate	598–63–0
PbCrO_{4}	lead chromate	7758–97–6
PbF_{2}	lead(II) fluoride	7783–46–2
PbO	lead(II) oxide	1317–36–8
PbO_{2}	lead dioxide	1309–60–0
PbS	lead(II) sulfide	1314–87–0
PbSO_{4}	lead(II) sulfate	7446–14–2
Pb_{2}	diplumbyne	
PoBr_{2}	polonium dibromide	66794–54–5
PoCl_{2}	polonium dichloride	
PoCl_{4}	polonium tetrachloride	10026–02–5
PoF_{6}	polonium hexafluoride	35473–38–2
PoH_{2}	polonium hydride	31060–73–8
PoO	polonium monoxide	
PoO_{2}	polonium dioxide	7446–06–2
PoO_{3}	polonium trioxide	

== R ==
Chemical formula	Synonyms	CAS number
RaCl_{2}	radium chloride	10025–66–8
RbBr	rubidium bromide	7789–39–1
RbBrO	rubidium hypobromite	
RbBrO_{2}	rubidium bromite	
RbBrO_{3}	rubidium bromate	
RbBrO_{4}	rubidium perbromate	
RbCl	rubidium chloride	7791–11–9
RbClO	rubidium hypochlorite	
RbClO_{2}	rubidium chlorite	
RbClO_{3}	rubidium chlorate	13446–71–4
RbClO_{4}	rubidium perchlorate	13510–42–4
RbCN	rubidium cyanide	19073–56–4
RbCNO	rubidium cyanate	
RbCNO	rubidium fulminate	
RbF	rubidium fluoride	13446–74–7
RbH	rubidium hydride	
RbH_{2}PO_{3}	monorubidium phosphite	
RbH_{2}PO_{4}	monorubidium phosphate	
RbHS	rubidium hydrosulfide	
RbI	rubidium iodide	7790–29–6
RbIO	rubidium hypoiodite	
RbIO_{2}	rubidium iodite	
RbIO_{3}	rubidium iodate	
RbIO_{4}	rubidium periodate	
RbOH	rubidium hydroxide	1310–82–3
Rb_{2}O	rubidium oxide	18088–11–4
Rb_{2}O_{2}	rubidium peroxide	
Rb_{2}CO_{3}	rubidium carbonate	584–09–8
Rb_{2}S	rubidium sulfide	
Rb_{2}SO_{3}	rubidium sulfite	
Rb_{2}SO_{4}	rubidium sulfate	7488–54–2
Rb_{2}HPO_{3}	dirubidium phosphite	
Rb_{2}HPO_{4}	dirubidium phosphate	
Rb_{3}PO_{3}	trirubidium phosphite	
Rb_{3}PO_{4}	trirubidium phosphate	
RbHCO_{3}	rubidium bicarbonate	
RbHSO_{3}	rubidium bisulfite	
RbHSO_{4}	rubidium bisulfate	15587–72–1
RbNbO_{3}	rubidium niobate	
RbNO_{2}	rubidium nitrite	
RbNO_{3}	rubidium nitrate	13126–12–0
RnF_{2}	radon difluoride	
RuCl_{3}	ruthenium(III) chloride	10049–08–8
RuF_{6}	ruthenium hexafluoride	13693–08–8
RuO_{4}	ruthenium tetroxide	20427–56–9

== S ==
Chemical formula	Synonyms	CAS number
SCN^{−}	thiocyanate ion	302–04–5
SF_{4}	sulfur tetrafluoride	7783–60–0
SF_{6}	sulfur hexafluoride	2551–62–4
SOF_{2}	thionyl difluoride	7783–42–8
SO_{2}	sulfur dioxide	7446–09–5
SO_{2}Cl_{2}	sulfuryl chloride	7791–25–5
SO_{2}F_{2}	sulfuryl difluoride	2699–79–8
SO_{2}OOH^{−}	peroxymonosulfurous acid (aqueous)	
SO_{3}	sulfur trioxide	7446–11–9
SO_{3}^{2−}	sulfite ion	14265–45–3
SO_{4}^{2−}	sulfate ion	14808–79–8
S_{2}Br_{2}	sulfur(II) bromide	71677–14–0
S_{2}O_{3}^{2−}	thiosulfate ion	14383–50–7
S_{2}O_{7}^{2−}	disulfate ion	16057–15–1
SbBr_{3}	antimony(III) bromide	7789–61–9
SbCl_{3}	antimony(III) chloride	10025–91–9
SbCl_{5}	antimony(V) chloride	7647–18–9
SbI_{3}	antimony(III) iodide	7790–44–5
SbPO_{4}	antimony(III) phosphate	
Sb_{2}OS_{2}	antimony oxysulfide kermesite	12196–78–0
Sb_{2}O_{3}	antimony(III) oxide	1309–64–4
Sb_{2}O_{5}	antimony(V) oxide	1314–60–9
Sb_{2}S_{3}	antimony(III) sulfide	1345–04–6
Sb_{2}Se_{3}	antimony(III) selenide	1315–05–5
Sb_{2}Se_{5}	antimony(V) selenide	
Sb_{2}Te_{3}	antimony(III) telluride	
Sc_{2}O_{3}	scandium oxide scandia	12060–08–1
SeBr_{4}	selenium(IV) bromide	7789–65–3
SeCl	selenium(I) chloride	
SeCl_{4}	selenium(IV) chloride	10026–03–6
SeOCl_{2}	selenium(IV) oxychloride	7791–23–3
SeOF_{2}	selenyl difluoride	7783–43–9
SeO_{2}	selenium(IV) oxide	7446–08–4
SeO_{4}^{2−}	selenate ion	14124–68–6
SeTe	selenium(IV) telluride	12067–42–4
SiBr_{4}	silicon(IV) bromide	7789–66–4
SiC	silicon carbide	409–21–2
SiCl_{4}	silicon(IV) chloride	10026–04–7
SiH_{4}	silane	7803–62–5
SiI_{4}	silicon(IV) iodide	13465–84–4
SiO_{2}	silicon(IV) dioxide silica quartz	7631–86–9
SiO_{4}^{4−}	silicate ion	17181–37–2
Si_{2}O_{7}^{6−}	disilicate ion	
Si_{3}N_{4}	silicon nitride	12033–89–5
Si_{6}O_{18}^{12−}	cyclosilicate ion	
SnBrCl_{3}	tin(IV) bromotrichloride	
SnBr_{2}	tin(II) bromide	10031–24–0
SnBr_{2}Cl_{2}	tin(IV) dibromodichloride	
SnBr_{3}Cl	tin(IV) tribromochloride	14779–73–8
SnBr_{4}	tin(IV) bromide	7789–67–5
Sn(CH_{3}COO)_{2}	tin(II) acetate	
Sn(CH_{3}COO)_{4}	tin(IV) acetate	
SnCl_{2}	tin(II) chloride	7772–99–8
SnCl_{2}I_{2}	tin(IV) dichlorodiiodide	
SnCl_{4}	tin(IV) chloride	7646–78–8
Sn(CrO_{4})_{2}	tin(IV) chromate	10101–75–4
SnI_{4}	tin(IV) iodide	7790–47–8
Sn(OH)_{2}	tin(II) hydroxide	
Sn(OH)_{4}	tin(IV) hydroxide	
SnO	tin(II) oxide	
SnO_{2}	tin(IV) oxide	18282–10–5
SnO_{3}^{2−}	stannate ion	
SnS	tin(II) sulfide	1314–95–0
SnS_{2}	tin(IV) sulfide	1315–01–1
Sn(SO_{4})_{2}·2H_{2}O	tin(IV) sulfate dihydrate	
SnSe	tin(II) selenide	1315–06–6
SnSe_{2}	tin(IV) selenide	20770–09–6
SnTe	tin(II) telluride	12040–02–7
SnTe_{4}	tin(IV) telluride	
Sn(VO_{3})_{2}	tin(II) metavanadate	
Sn_{3}Sb_{4}	tin(IV) antimonide	
SrBr_{2}	strontium bromide	10476–81–0
SrBr_{2}·6H_{2}O	strontium bromide hexahydrate	7789–53–9
SrCO_{3}	strontium carbonate	1633–05–2
SrCl_{2}	strontium chloride	10476–85–4
Sr(ClO)_{2}	strontium hypochlorite	
Sr(ClO_{2})_{2}	strontium chlorite	
Sr(ClO_{3})_{2}	strontium chlorate	
Sr(ClO_{4})_{2}	strontium perchlorate	
SrC_{2}O_{4}	strontium oxalate	814–95–9
SrF_{2}	strontium fluoride	7783–48–4
SrHfO_{3}	strontium hafnate	
Sr(HS)_{2}	strontium hydrosulfide	
SrI_{2}	strontium iodide	10476–86–5
SrI_{2}·6H_{2}O	strontium iodide hexahydrate	7790–40–1
Sr(IO)_{2}	strontium hypoiodite	
Sr(IO_{2})_{2}	strontium iodite	
Sr(IO_{3})_{2}	strontium iodate	
Sr(IO_{4})_{2}	strontium periodate	
Sr(MnO_{4})_{2}	strontium permanganate	
SrMoO_{4}	strontium orthomolybdate	13470–04–7
Sr(NbO_{3})_{2}	strontium metaniobate	
SrO	strontium oxide	1314–11–0
Sr(OH)_{2}	strontium hydroxide	
Sr_{2}RuO_{4}	strontium ruthenate	
SrS	strontium sulfide	1314–96–1
SrSeO_{3}	strontium selenite	14590–38–6
SrSeO_{4}	strontium selenate	7446–21–1
SrTeO_{3}	strontium tellurite	15851–40–8
SrTeO_{4}	strontium tellurate	15852–10–5
SrTiO_{3}	strontium metatitanate	

== T ==
Chemical formula	Name	CAS number
T_{2}O	tritium oxide tritiated water	14940–65–9
TaBr_{3}	tantalum(III) bromide	
TaBr_{5}	tantalum(V) bromide	13451–11–1
TaCl_{5}	tantalum(V) chloride	7721–01–9
TaI_{5}	tantalum(V) iodide	14693–81–3
TaO_{3}^{−}	tantalate ion	
TcO_{4}^{−}	pertechnetate ion	14333–20–1
TeBr_{2}	tellurium(II) bromide	7789–54–0
TeBr_{4}	tellurium(IV) bromide	10031–27–3
TeCl_{2}	tellurium(II) chloride	10025–71–5
TeCl_{4}	tellurium(IV) chloride	10026–07–0
TeI_{2}	tellurium(II) iodide	
TeI_{4}	tellurium(IV) iodide	7790–48–9
TeO_{2}	tellurium(IV) oxide	7446–07–3
TeO_{4}^{2−}	tellurate ion	15852–22–9
TeY	yttrium telluride	12187–04–1
Th(CO_{3})_{2}	thorium carbonate	19024–62–5
Th(NO_{3})_{4}	thorium nitrate	13823–29–5
ThO_{2}	thorium(IV) oxide	
Th(SO_{4})_{2}	thorium(IV) sulfate	
TiBr_{4}	titanium(IV) bromide	7789–68–6
TiCl_{2}I_{2}	titanium(IV) dichlorodiiodide	
TiCl_{3}I	titanium(IV) trichloroiodide	
TiCl_{4}	titanium tetrachloride	7550–45–0
TiH_{2}	titanium hydride	
TiO_{2}	titanium dioxide rutile	1317–70–0
TiO_{3}^{2−}	titanate ion	
TlBr	thallium(I) bromide	7789–40–4
TlBr_{3}	thallium(III) bromide	13701–90–1
Tl(CHO_{2})	thallium(I) formate	992–98–3
TlC_{2}H_{3}O_{2}	thallium(I) acetate	563–68–8
Tl(C_{3}H_{3}O_{4})	thalliium(I) malonate	2757–18–8
TlCl	thallium(I) chloride	7791–12–0
TlCl_{3}	thallium(III) chloride	13453–32–2
TlF	thallium(I) fluoride	7789–27–7
TlI	thallium(I) iodide	7790–30–9
TlIO_{3}	thallium(I) iodate	14767–09–0
TlI_{3}	thallium(III) iodide	
TiI_{4}	titanium(IV) iodide	7720–83–4
TiO(NO_{3})_{2} · xH_{2}O	titanium(IV) oxynitrate hydrate	
TlNO_{3}	thallium(I) nitrate	10102–45–1
TlOH	thallium(I) hydroxide	12026–06–1
TlPF_{6}	thallium(I) hexafluorophosphate	60969–19–9
TlSCN	thallium thiocyanate	3535–84–0
Tl_{2}MoO_{4}	thallium(I) orthomolybdate	
Tl_{2}SeO_{3}	thallium(I) selenite	
Tl_{2}TeO_{3}	thallium(I) tellurite	
Tl_{2}WO_{4}	thallium(I) orthotungstate	
Tl_{3}As	thallium(I) arsenide	
TmCl_{3}	thulium(III) chloride	13537-18-3
Tm(NO_{3})_{3}	thulium(III) nitrate	
Tm_{2}(SO_{4})_{3}	thullium(III) sulfate	

== U ==
Chemical formula	Synonyms	CAS number
UBr_{2}	uranium dibromide	13775–13–8
UBr_{3}	uranium tribromide	13470–19–4
UBr_{5}	uranium pentabromide	13775–16–1
UC_{2}	uranium carbide	12070–09–6
UCl_{3}	uranium trichloride	10025–93–1
UCl_{4}	uranium tetrachloride	10026–10–5
UF_{4}	uranium(IV) fluoride	10049–14–6
UF_{6}	uranium(VI) fluoride	7783–81–5
UI_{3}	uranium(III) iodide	
UN	uranium nitride	12033–83–9
UO_{2}	uranium dioxide	1344–57–6
UO_{2}(CH_{3}COO)_{2}	uranyl acetate	541–09–3
UO_{2}Cl_{2}	uranyl chloride	7791–26–6
UO_{2}(HCOO)_{2}	uranyl formate	16984–59–1
UO_{2}(NO_{3})_{2}	uranyl nitrate	10102–06–4
UO_{2}SO_{4}	uranyl sulfate	
UO_{3}	uranium trioxide	1344–58–7
U_{3}O_{8}	triuranium octoxide	1344–59–8
USe_{2}	uranium diselenide	12138–21–5
US_{2}	uranium sulfide	12039–14–4
UTe_{2}	uranium ditelluride	12138–37–3

== V ==
Chemical formula	Synonyms	CAS number
VBr_{2}	vanadium(II) bromide	
VBr_{3}	vanadium(III) bromide	13470–26–3
VCl_{2}	vanadium(II) chloride	10580–52–6
VCl_{3}	vanadium(III) chloride	7718–98–1
VI_{3}	vanadium(III) iodide	15513-94-7
VN	vanadium nitride	24646–85–3
VOC_{2}O_{4}	vanadyl oxalate	
VOSO_{4}	vanadium oxysulfate	27774–13–6
V_{2}O_{3}	vanadium(III) oxide	1314–34–7
V_{2}O_{5}	vanadium pentoxide	1314–62–1
V_{2}O_{7}^{4−}	divanadate ion pyrovanadate ion	

== W ==
Chemical formula	Synonyms	CAS number
WBr_{2}	tungsten(II) bromide	13470–10–5
WBr_{3}	tungsten(III) bromide	15163–24–3
WBr_{4}	tungsten(IV) bromide	14055–81–3
WBr_{5}	tungsten(V) bromide	13470–11–6
WBr_{6}	tungsten(VI) bromide	13701–86–5
W(CO)_{6}	tungsten(VI) carbonyl	14040–11–0
WCl_{2}	tungsten(II) chloride	13470–12–7
WCl_{3}	tungsten(III) chloride	20193–56–0
WCl_{4}	tungsten(IV) chloride	13470–13–8
WCl_{5}	tungsten(V) chloride	13470–14–9
WCl_{6}	tungsten(VI) chloride	13283–01–7
WF_{4}	tungsten(IV) fluoride	13766–47–7
WF_{5}	tungsten(V) fluoride	19357–83–6
WF_{6}	tungsten(VI) fluoride	7783–82–6
WI_{2}	tungsten(II) iodide	13470–17–2
WI_{4}	tungsten(IV) iodide	14055–84–6
WOBr_{3}	tungsten(V) oxytribromide	20213–56–3
WOBr_{4}	tungsten(VI) oxytetrabromide	13520–77–9
WOCl_{3}	tungsten(V) oxytrichloride	14249–98–0
WOCl_{4}	tungsten(VI) oxytetrachloride	13520–78–0
WOF_{4}	tungsten(VI) oxytetrafluoride	13520–79–1
WO_{2}	tungsten(IV) oxide	12036–22–5
WO_{2}Br_{2}	tungsten(VI) dioxydibromide	13520–75–7
WO_{2}Cl_{2}	tungsten(VI) dioxydichloride	13520–76–8
WO_{2}I_{2}	tungsten(VI) dioxydiiodide	14447–89–3
WO_{3}	tungsten(VI) oxide	1314–35–8
WO_{4}^{2−}	tungstate ion	14311–52–5
WS_{2}	tungsten(IV) sulfide	12138–09–9
WS_{3}	tungsten(VI) sulfide	12125–19–8
WSe_{2}	tungsten(IV) selenide	12067–46–8
WTe_{2}	tungsten(IV) telluride	12067–76–4
WC	tungsten carbide	12070–13–2

== X ==
Chemical formula	Synonyms	CAS number
XeBr_{2}	Xenon dibromide	73378–57–1
Xe(C_{6}F_{6})_{2}	Bis(pentafluorophenyl)xenon	328379-54-0
XeCl	Xenon monochloride	55130-03-5
XeCl_{2}	Xenon dichloride	14989-42-5
XeCl_{4}	Xenon tetrachloride	13780-38-6
XeF	Xenon monofluoride	
XeF_{2}	Xenon difluoride	13709-36-9
XeF_{4}	Xenon tetrafluoride	13709-61-0
XeF_{6}	Xenon hexafluoride	13693-09-9
XeO_{2}	Xenon dioxide	
XeO_{3}	Xenon trioxide	13776-58-4
XeO_{4}	Xenon tetroxide	12340-14-6
XeOF_{2}	Xenon oxydifluoride	13780-64-8
XeO_{2}F_{2}	Xenon dioxydifluoride	
XePtF_{6}	Xenon hexafluoroplatinate	12062-18-9
XeRhF_{6}	Xenon hexafluororhodate	

== Y ==
Chemical formula	Synonyms	CAS number
YAs	yttrium arsenide	12255–48–0
YB_{6}	yttrium boride	12008–32–1
YBr_{3}	yttrium bromide	13469–98–2
YC_{2}	yttrium carbide	12071–35–1
YCl_{3}	yttrium chloride	10361–92–9
YF_{3}	yttrium fluoride	13709–49–4
YP	yttrium phosphide	12294–01–8
YSb	yttrium antimonide	12186–97–9
YVO_{4}	yttrium vanadate	13566–12–6
Y_{2}O_{3}	yttria yttrium oxide	1314–36–9
Y_{2}S_{3}	yttrium sulfide	12039–19–9
YbBr_{2}	ytterbium(II) bromide	25502–05–0
YbBr_{3}	ytterbium(III) bromide	13759–89–2
YbCl_{2}	ytterbium(II)chloride	13874–77–6
YbCl_{3}	ytterbium(III) chloride	10361–91–8
YbCl_{3}·6H_{2}O	ytterbium(III) chloride hexahydrate	19423–87–1
Yb(ClO_{4})_{3}	ytterbium(III) perchlorate	
YbF_{2}	ytterbium(II) fluoride	15192–18–4
YbF_{3}	ytterbium(III) fluoride	13760–80–0
YbI_{2}	ytterbium(II) iodide	19357–86–9
YbI_{3}	ytterbium(III) iodide	13813–44–0
YbPO_{4}	ytterbium(III) phosphate	
YbSe	ytterbium(II) selenide	12039–54–2
YbSi_{2}	ytterbium(II) silicide	12039–89–3
Yb_{2}O_{3}	ytterbium(III) oxide	1314–37–0
Yb_{2}S_{3}	ytterbium(III) sulfide	12039–20–2
Yb_{2}Se_{3}	ytterbium(III) selenide	12166–52–8
YbTe	ytterbium(II) telluride	12125–58–5

== Z ==
Chemical formula	Synonyms	CAS number
Zn(AlO_{2})_{2}	zinc aluminate	68186–87–8
Zn(AsO_{2})_{2}	zinc arsenite	10326–24–6
ZnBr_{2}	zinc bromide	7699–45–8
Zn(CN)_{2}	zinc cyanide	557–21–1
ZnCO_{3}	zinc carbonate	3486–35–9
Zn(C_{8}H_{15}O_{2})_{2}	zinc caprylate	557–09–5
Zn(ClO_{3})_{2}	zinc chlorate	10361–95–2
ZnCl_{2}	zinc chloride	7646–85–7
ZnCr_{2}O_{4}	zinc chromite	12018–19–8
ZnF_{2}	zinc fluoride	7783–49–5
Zn(IO_{3})_{2}	zinc iodate	7790–37–6
ZnI_{2}	zinc iodide	10139–47–6
ZnMoO_{4}	zinc orthomolybdate	
Zn(NO_{2})_{2}	zinc nitrite	10102–02–0
Zn(NO_{3})_{2}	zinc nitrate	7779–88–6
Zn(NbO_{3}	zinc metaniobate	
ZnO	zinc(II) oxide zinc oxide	1314–13–2
ZnO_{2}	zinc peroxide	1314–22–3
Zn(OH)_{2}	zinc hydroxide	20427–58–1
Zn(OH)_{4}^{2−}	zincate ion	
ZnS	zinc sulfide sphalerite	1314–98–3
Zn(SCN)_{2}	zinc thiocyanate	557–42–6
Zn(SeCN)_{2}	zinc selenocyanate	
ZnSO_{3}	zinc sulfite	
ZnS_{2}O_{3}	zinc thiosulfate	
ZnSO_{4}	zinc sulfate	7733–02–0
ZnSb	zinc antimonide	12039–35–9
ZnSe	zinc selenide	1315–09–9
ZnSeO_{3}	zinc selenite	13597-46-1
ZnSeO_{4}	zinc selenate	
ZnSnO_{3}	zinc stannate	12036-37-2
Zn(TaO_{3})_{2}	zinc metatantalate	
ZnTe	zinc telluride	1315–11–3
ZnTeO_{3}	zinc tellurite	
ZnTeO_{4}	zinc tellurate	
ZnTiO_{3}	zinc metatitanate	
Zn(VO_{3})_{2}	zinc metavanadate	
ZnWO_{4}	zinc orthotungstate	
ZnZrO_{3}	zinc metazirconate	
Zn_{2}P_{2}O_{7}	zinc pyrophosphate	7446–26–6
Zn_{2}SiO_{4}	zinc orthosilicate	13597–65–4
Zn_{3}(AsO_{4})_{2}	zinc arsenate	13464–44–3
Zn_{3}As_{2}	zinc arsenide	12006–40–5
Zn_{3}N_{2}	zinc nitride	1313–49–1
Zn_{3}P_{2}	zinc phosphide	1314–84–7
Zn_{3}(PO_{4})_{2}	zinc phosphate	7779–90–0
Zn_{3}Sb_{2}	zinc antimonide	
ZrB_{2}	zirconium boride	12045–64–6
ZrBr_{4}	zirconium bromide	13777–25–8
ZrC	zirconium carbide	12020–14–3
ZrCl_{4}	zirconium tetrachloride	10026–11–6
ZrF_{4}	zirconium fluoride	7783–64–4
ZrI_{4}	zirconium(IV) iodide	13986–26–0
ZrN	zirconium nitride	25658–42–8
Zr(NO_{3})_{4}	zirconium(IV) nitrate	
Zr(OH)_{4}	zirconium hydroxide	14475–63–9
ZrO_{2}	zirconium dioxide baddeleyite	1314–23–4
ZrO_{3}^{2−}	zirconate ion	
ZrP_{2}	zirconium phosphide	12037–80–8
ZrS_{2}	zirconium sulfide	12039–15–5
ZrSi_{2}	zirconium silicide	12039–90–6
ZrSiO_{4}	zirconium(IV) silicate	10101–52–7
Zr(SO_{4})_{2}	zirconium(IV) sulfate	14644–61–2
Zr_{3}(PO_{4})_{4}	zirconium phosphate	13765–95–2
