= Ashoka tree =

Ashoka tree is a common name for two plants which are frequently confused with each other:

- Saraca asoca, native to South Asia and western Myanmar
- Saraca indica, native to eastern Myanmar and Southeast Asia
- Monoon longifolium is sometimes called the "false ashoka"
