= Trees of India =

== Trees of India ==
Order	Family	Species	Names	Image
Arecales	Arecaceae	Areca catechu	Supari in Hindi; सुपारी and Bengali; সুপারি (supārī) in Marathi; kamugu, paakku (fruit) in Tamil; kavugu, adike in Kannada; adakka-maram in Malayalam also; areca palm, areca nut palm, betel palm, betel nut palm, Indian nut, Pinang palm, catechu	
Arecales	Arecaceae	Borassus flabellifer	Brab tree, toddy palm, tala palm; in Bengali (বাংলা) তাল; பனை மரம் in Tamil; ताड in Marathi; తాటి చెట్టు in Telugu; also doub palm, palmyra palm, tala or tal palm, toddy palm, lontar palm, wine palm, ice apple	
Arecales	Arecaceae	Caryota urens	Toddy palm, kitul palm, jaggery palm, wine palm, sago palm, solitary fishtail palm	
Arecales	Arecaceae	Cocos nucifera	नारिकेल in Sanskrit; नारळ in Marathi; नारियल in Hindi; नरीअर in Bhojpuri; தென்னை மரம் in Tamil; in Bengali (বাংলা) Narikel (নারিকেল); kobbari in Telugu; ತೆಂಗಿನ ಕಾಯಿ tengina kaayi in Kannada; also coconut	
Arecales	Arecaceae	Phoenix sylvestris	Sendhi, salma, khaji, khajur in Hindi; खजूर khajūr in Marathi; khejur in Bengali খেজুর; kharjoora in Kannada; Itcham-pannai, paereecham in Tamil; also silver date palm, Indian date, sugar date palm, wild date palm	
Arecales	Arecaceae	Phoenix canariensis	Canary date palm	
Arecales	Arecaceae	Roystonea regia	Mountain glory, bottle Palm; also royal palm, Cuban royal palm, Florida royal palm	
Boraginales	Boraginaceae	Cordia sebestena	siricote or kopté in 19th century northern Yucatán; scarlet cordia in Jamaica; Geiger tree	
Brassicales	Caricaceae	Carica papaya	Papaya; Papita in Hindi; pepe or pe(n)pe in Bengali পেঁপে; पपई in Marathi; Parangi in Kannada; Pappali in Tamil; Boppai in Telugu; also papaw, pawpaw	
Brassicales	Moringaceae	Moringa oleifera	Moringa/Drumstick tree; munga soudha in Hindi; সজনে in Bengali; sahajan in Bhojpuri; shevga-शेवगा in Marathi; nugge kayi in Kannada; midhosaragavo in Gujarati; mulaga in Telugu and murungai maram முருங்கை மரம் in Tamil; murungaikkai in Tamil and Malayalam; also horseradish tree	
Brassicales	Salvadoraceae	Salvadora persica	Arak, galenia asiatica, peelu, pilu, Salvadora indica, Miswak मेसवाक; also toothbrush tree, jhak, mustard tree	
Ericales	Lecythidaceae	Barringtonia asiatica	Mudilla, fish poison tree, putat, sea poison tree	
Ericales	Lecythidaceae	Couroupita guianensis	कैलाशपति "तोफगोळ्याचे झाड in Marathi; नागलिंगम in Hindi, Tamil and Bengali; also cannon-ball tree	
Ericales	Sapotaceae	Madhuca longifolia	Mohwa, mahula, banmahuva, maul (মহুল) in Bengali; madhuka in Sanskrit; mohwa, mahua, jangli-mona, maul in Hindi; मोह (moha) in Marathi; kat-illipi, illupai in Tamil; also madhūka, mahura, madkam, mahuwa, butter tree, mahura, mahwa, mohulo, iluppai, mee or ippa-chettu	
Ericales	Sapotaceae	Mimusops elengi	(Bakul बकुळ; also Spanish cherry, medlar, bullet wood, বকুল in Bengali	
Fabales	Fabaceae	Adenanthera pavonina	Rakta kambal in Bengali; thorligunj or ratangunj in Marathi; guruvendi in Telugu; bandi in Tamil Anikundumani; also acacia coral, arbre À Église, bead tree, circassian seed, corail végétal, coral wood, madhoshi, moralitos, curly bean, deleite, delicia, dilmawi, graine-réglisse, jumbi-bead, l'Église, peronías, peonía, peonía extranjera, piriquiti, red bead tree, réglisse, Barbados pride, peacock flower fence, sandalwood tree, saga, manchadi	
Fabales	Fabaceae	Butea monosperma	Kimshuka or Palasa in Sanskrit; Palash (পলাশ) in Bengali and Hindi; Porasum in Tamil; Parrot Tree; also flame of the forest, Bengal kino, dhak, palash, bastard teak	
Fabales	Fabaceae	Cassia fistula	kanikkonna in Malayalam; kondrai in Tamil; also golden shower, purging cassia, Indian laburnum, kani konna, pudding-pipe tree	
Fabales	Fabaceae	Cassia grandis	Pu vakai in Tamil; Konna in Malayalam; also pink shower tree, carao, horse cassia	
Fagales	Casuarinaceae	Casuarina equisetifolia	विलायती सरू in Hindi; जंगली सरू in Marathi; சவுக்கு மரம் in Tamil; in Bengali (বাংলা) Jhau (ঝাউ); "sarugudu" in Telugu; GaaLi mara in Kannada; also coastal she-oak, horsetail she-oak, ironwood, beach she-oak, beach casuarina, whistling tree, Australian pine	
Fabales	Fabaceae	Dalbergia sissoo	Sissoo, sisu, sheesham, tahli, Indian rosewood	
Fabales	Fabaceae	Delonix regia	Mayaram மயரம் and neruppukkondrai maram in Tamil; shima sankesula in Telugu; কৃষ্ণচূড়া (krishnachura) in Bengali; and गुलमोहर (gulmohar) in Marathi and Hindi; also flame of the forest, flamboyant, royal peacock flower, royal gold mohur, fire tree	
Fabales	Fabaceae	Erythrina variegata	Indian coral tree; mandara in Sanskrit, Hindi and Bengali; mandaram in Malayalam; kalyana murungai கல்யாண முருங்கை in Tamil; pangara-पांगारा in Marathi; also tiger's claw, Indian coral tree	
Fabales	Fabaceae	Peltophorum pterocarpum	ताम्रशिंबी in Sanskrit and Marathi; lya vakai in Tamil; kon-dachinta in Telugu; also copperpod, yellow-flamboyant, yellow flametree, yellow poinciana, yellow-flame	
Fabales	Fabaceae	Pithecellobium dulce	Manila tamarind, vilayati ambli in Gujarati; Jungle jalebi or ganga imli in Hindi; रानचिंच (rān chincha) in Marathi; seeme hunase in Kannada; సీమ చింతకాయ in Telugu; kodukkai puli maram in Tamil; also Madras thorn, monkeypod tree, camachile	
Fabales	Fabaceae	Pongamia pinnata	Karanj or कारंजा in Hindi, Bengali, Marathi and Gujarati; pungam புங்கம் in Tamil; pungu in Telugu; also Indian beech, karanja, pongame oil tree	
Fabales	Fabaceae	Pterocarpus santalinus	Red sanders, रक्तचंदन rakta chandana; also red saunders, yerra chandanam, chenchandanam, red sandalwood, rakta chandana, rakto chandon; রক্ত চন্দন in Bengali	
Fabales	Fabaceae	Samanea saman	Saman or guango in Marathi; belaiti siris in Hindi; thoonguvaagai or thoongumoonji maram தூங்குவாகை in Tamil i.e. sleeping tree; also saman, rain tree, monkey pod	
Fabales	Fabaceae	Saraca indica	Asoka tree, ashok, asoca, Sorrowless Tree (Often confused for Monoon longifolium, which is more common in India); অশোক (Ashok) in (বাংলা) Bengali;	
Fabales	Fabaceae	Senegalia catechu	Catechu, cachou, black cutch; also kher, cutchtree, black catechu	
Fabales	Fabaceae	Tamarindus indica	Imli in Hindi; puli-புளி in Tamil; chinta in Telugu; তেঁতুল (tentul) in Bengali; chinch-चिंच in Marathi; amli in Gujarati; hunise hannu in Kannada; the Persian name Tamar-i-hind means Indian date	
Fabales	Fabaceae	Vachellia nilotica	Gum arabic tree, babul, thorn mimosa, Egyptian acacia, thorny acacia	
Gentianales	Apocynaceae	Plumeria rubra	Khera chapha or pandhra chapha-पांढरा चाफा in Marathi; champa or gulechin in Hindi; kath champa in Bengali; rhada champo in Gujarati; arali in Tamil; also frangipani, red paucipan, red-jasmine, red frangipani, common frangipani, temple tree, calachuchi, plumeria, champa, pagoda tree	
Gentianales	Apocynaceae	Alstonia scholaris	Chhatim (ছাতিম) in Bengali; सप्तपर्णी in Marathi; also Blackboard tree, Indian devil tree, ditabark, milkwood pine, white cheesewood, Pulai, scholar tree	
Lamiales	Bignoniaceae	Millingtonia hortensis	akas nim or nim chameli in Hindi; karkku கர்க்கு in Tamil; kavuku in Telugu; also Indian cork tree, jasmine tree	
Lamiales	Bignoniaceae	Spathodea	Rudrapalash (রুদ্র পলাশ)in Bengali; पिचकारी Pichkari in Marathi and Hindi; patade in Telugu; patadi in Tamil; also bell flambeau, scarlet bell tree, fountain tree, syringe tree, squirt tree, African tulip tree and sometimes wrongly flame tree	
Lamiales	Bignoniaceae	Jacaranda mimosifolia	Blue jacaranda, palisander, nupur नुपुर; neelmohar नीलमोहर; green ebony tree, jacaranda, black poui, nupur, fern tree	
Lamiales	Bignoniaceae	Tecomella Undulata	Desert teak, marwar teak, rohida	
Lamiales	Lamiaceae	Gmelina arborea	Khamara in Hindi; kulimavu in Kannada; mara and shivani in Kashmiri; शिवान् in Marathi; also beechwood, gmelina, goomar teak, Kashmir tree, Malay beechwood, white teak, yamane, gamhar	
Lamiales	Lamiaceae	Tectona grandis	Saigun in Hindi; saka in Sanskrit; sag-साग in Marathi; shegun (সেগুন) in Bengali; tega in Kannada; saga in Gujarati; also Indian Oak	
Magnoliales	Annonaceae	Monoon longifolium	Ashoka or debdaru in Hindi; ashoka or devdaar in Marathi; asopala in Gujarati; nara in Telugu; devadaaru in Kannada; debdaru (দেবদারু) in Bengali; also mast tree, cemetery tree	
Malpighiales	Calophyllaceae	Calophyllum inophyllum	Kath Champa, Sultana Champa, Punnaga in Sanskrit and Bengali; Sultana Champa, Surpan, Undi, Surpunka in Hindi; Pinnai and Punnagam in Tamil; also tamanu, oil-nut, mastwood, beach calophyllum, beautyleaf	
Malpighiales	Clusiaceae	Garcinia indica	कोकम or आमसुल in Marathi and Kokani; bindin, biran, bhirand, bhinda, bhrinda, brinda, mangosteen, wild mangosteen, red mango; also kokum	
Magnoliales	Magnoliaceae	Magnolia champaca	Champa (চম্পা) and champaka in Bengali and Hindi; चंपा or चाफा (champā or chāphā) in Marathi; chembuga and chambugam in Tamil; champaka in Telugu; champakam in Malayalam; sampige in Kannada; also joy perfume tree, yellow jade orchid tree, fragrant Himalayan champaca	
Magnoliales	Myristicaceae	Myristica fragrans	Nutmeg	
Malpighiales	Phyllanthaceae	Phyllanthus emblica	Amalaka in Sanskrit; amla in Hindi; आवळा (āwaLā) in Marathi; Amlaki in Bengali; Nellikkai in Kannada and Tamil; ఉసిరి in Telugualso; also emblic, emblic myrobalan, myrobalan, Indian gooseberry, Malacca tree	
Malvales	Dipterocarpaceae	Shorea robusta	Sal tree, sāla, shala, sakhua, sarai	
Malvales	Malvaceae	Adansonia digitata	Gorak amli and goram lichora in Hindi; Gorak chinch in Gujarati; Paparapulia & Perruka in Tamil; also monkey-bread tree, upside-down tree, cream of tartar tre	
Malvales	Malvaceae	Thespesia populnea	पार्श्वपिप्पल (Pārśvapippala) in Sanskrit; पारोसा पिंपळ, आष्ट, पिंपरणी, पारस भेंडी in Marathi; பூவரசு in Tamil; గంగరావి in Telugu; also portia tree, Pacific rosewood, Indian tulip tree, milo, umbrella tree, portia	
Malvales	Malvaceae	Sterculia	Jangli badam in Hindi and Bengali; gorapu-badam, gurapu-vadam, pottaikavalam in Tamil; also bastard poon tree, hazel sterculia, Indian almond	
Malvales	Malvaceae	Bombax ceiba	काटे-सावरी Kāte sāvarī, savar or saur in Maharashtra; simal or shimbal in Hindi; hatti mara in Kannada; shimul in Bengali; ilavu or ilava maram இலவ மரம் in Tamil, Malayalam and Salmali; booruga in Telugu malabar; also silk-cotton tree, red silk-cotton, red cotton tree, or ambiguously as silk-cotton or kapok	
Malvales	Malvaceae	Pterospermum acerifolium	Son chapha-सोनचाफा in Marathi; muchukunda in Bengali; kanak champa, kaniar, katha champa in Hindi; also bayur tree, karnikara tree	
Myrtales	Combretaceae	Terminalia arjuna	Arjuna, arjun tree	
Myrtales	Combretaceae	Terminalia catappa	जंगली बादाम Jaṅgalī bādāma in Hindi and Marathi, badam in Telugu; badami kaayi in Kannada	
Myrtales	Combretaceae	Terminalia chebula	Black or chebulic myrobalan	
Myrtales	Lythraceae	Lagerstroemia speciosa	Taman (तामण) or mota bondara in Marathi; arjuna in Hindi; jarul in Bengali; kaduli கடுலி in Tamil; vara gogu in Telugu; also giant crepe-myrtle, Queen's crepe-myrtle, banabá plant, pride of India	
Myrtales	Myrtaceae	Syzygium cumini	Jamun in Hindi and Bhojpuri; kala jambu in Gujarati; kalojam in Bengali; ನೇರಳೆ NeraLe in Kannada; jambhul-जांभूळ in Marathi; naval or nagal in Tamil; also Malabar plum, Java plum, black plum, jamun, jaman, jambul, jambolan	
Oxalidales	Oxalidaceae	Averrhoa bilimbi	balimbing, bimbli, belimbing, cucumber tree, tree sorrel	
Rosales	Moraceae	Ficus elastica	Rubber fig, rubber bush, rubber tree, rubber plant, or Indian rubber bush, Indian rubber tree	
Rosales	Moraceae	Ficus benghalensis	वटवृक्ष in Sanskrit; वड in Marathi; bargad in Hindi; বট (bôṭ) in Bengali; aall and aala maram in Tamil; marri in Telugu; aalada mara ಆಲದ ಮರ in Kannada	
Rosales	Moraceae	Ficus religiosa	Pipal in Hindi; asvattha in Bengali; ಅರಳಿ ಮರ araLi mara in Kannada; jari in Gujarati; pimpal-पिंपळ in Marathi; ashvatthame in Telugu; arasu or arasa maram அரச மரம் in Tamil; also bodhi tree, bo tree, peepul tree, peepal tree, pipala tree, ashvattha tree	
Rosales	Moraceae	Artocarpus heterophyllus	Kanthal in Bengali; Kathal in Hindi; Pila and Palaa in Tamil; फणस (Phañas) in Marathi; Plaav, Plaavu or Chakka in Malayalam; Panasa in Sanskrit; halasu in Kannada and Telugu; jackfruit	
Rosales	Rhamnaceae	Ziziphus mauritiana	बदरी (Badarī) in Sanskrit; बेर in Hindi and Bhojpuri; बोर in Marathi; kul in Bengali; இலந்தை in Tamil; also Indian jujube, Indian plum, Chinese date, Chinese apple, ber, dunks	
Santalales	Santalaceae	Santalum album	Chandan in Hindi and Bengali; chandana in Sanskrit; चंदन-गंध or simply चंदन in Marathi; sri gandha in Kannada; also true sandalwood, white sandalwood, Indian sandalwood	
Sapindales	Anacardiaceae	Mangifera indica	The tree is maa maram and the fruit is maangaai மாம்பழம் in Tamil; the fruit is keri in Gujarati; आंबा in Marathi; aam in Hindi and Bhojpuri; maamidi in Telugu; ಮಾವಿನ ಕಾಯಿMaavina kaayi in Kannada	
Sapindales	Anacardiaceae	Semecarpus anacardium	Biba, ker in Kannada; also marking nut tree, Malacca bean tree, marany nut, oriental cashew, dhobi nut tree, varnish tree	
Sapindales	Anacardiaceae	Anacardium occidentale	Mundhiri in Tamil; काजू in Marathi and Hindi; జీడి in Telugu; cashew	
Sapindales	Meliaceae	Azadirachta indica	Vaembu or vaeppa maram வேப்ப மரம் in Tamil; कडुलिंब in Marathi; vepa in Telugu; ಬೇವಿನ ಮರ bevina mara in Kannada; also neem, margosa, nimtree, Indian lilac	
Sapindales	Meliaceae	Melia azedarach	Chinaberry tree, pride of India, bead-tree, Cape lilac, syringa berrytree, Persian lilac, Indian lilac, white cedar	
Sapindales	Rutaceae	Bergera koenigii	Karivaepilai கருவேப்பிலை in Tamil or Kadipatta; karivepa in Telugu; karibevu in Kannada; कडिपत्ता in Marathi; also curry tree	
Sapindales	Rutaceae	Aegle marmelos	Bilva, bilwa, bel, kuvalam, koovalam, madtoum, beli fruit, Bengal quince, stone apple, wood apple, bael (or bili or bhel), golden apple, Japanese bitter orange	
