= Saraca thailandica =

Scientific classification
- Kingdom: Plantae
- Clade: Embryophytes
- Clade: Tracheophytes
- Clade: Angiosperms
- Clade: Eudicots
- Clade: Rosids
- Order: Fabales
- Family: Fabaceae
- Genus: Saraca
- Species: S. thailandica

Binomial name
- Saraca thailandica Pongam., Panyadee & Inta

Species of trees in the family Fabaceae

Saraca thailandica, known locally as ta na (Karen) and sok lueang Mae Moei (Thai: โสกเหลืองแม่เมย), is an endangered species of tree in the family Fabaceae, subfamily Detarioideae. It is endemic to Thailand but may also grow in Myanmar. The pods and seeds of the tree are consumed by the Karen people.

== Description ==
Saraca thailandica is a flowering tree growing up to 15 metres (49 feet) tall. The bark is blackish-brown and lenticellate. Leaves are paripinnate, growing to about 60 centimetres (2.0 feet) long, glabrescent and subcoriaceous; the rachis is 27–54 cm (11–21 inches) long and the petioles are short, 0.5–2.8 cm (0.2–1.1 in), swollen at the lower part, about 1.2 mm (0.047 in) in diameter, and glabrescent. Leaflets are in 3-6 pairs, ovate, elliptic to oblong-lanceolate, measuring 14 cm–42 cm × 6 cm–16 cm (5.5 in–16.5 in × 2.4 in–6.3 in), with bases rounded to cuneate and apexes acute to acuminate; leaflets of the lowest pair are distinctly smaller than the rest; leaflet petiolules are 5–10 mm (0.20–0.39 in).

Inflorescences are normally cauliflorous, on woody tubercles and some on leafy branches, corymbose, measuring 10 cm–20 cm × 15 cm–30 cm (3.9 in–7.9 in × 5.9 in–11.8 in) in diameter; the peduncle is 1–9 cm (0.4–3.5 in) long, thick, with a 5–6 mm (0.20–0.24 in) diameter, and glabrous; the rachis is 2–7 cm (0.8–2.8 in) long and glabrous. The bracts are much larger than the bracteoles, falling off early, enclosing a tuft of immature flowers, ovate to ovate-oblong, with an acute or obtuse tip, measuring 15 mm–26 mm × 10 mm–15 mm (0.59 in–1.02 in × 0.39 in–0.59 in) and glabrous. Bracteoles amount to 2, are sub opposite, and inserted at the top of the pedicels; they are more or less persistent or caducous, erect, and clasp the calyx tube, its color turns from yellowish orange to blackish brown at anthesis; their shape is ovate, elliptic to obovate with an obtuse tip, measuring 10 mm–13 mm × 5 mm–8 mm (0.39 in–0.51 in × 0.20 in–0.31 in), and glabrous on both sides. The calyx tube is yellowish orange, measuring 15 mm–25 mm × 1 mm–2.5 mm (0.59 in–0.98 in × 0.04 in–0.10 in); lobes amount to 4–5, are ovate or ovate to oblong, measure 8 mm–10 mm × 6 mm–10 mm (0.31 in–0.39 in × 0.24 in–0.39 in), their apexes are rounded or retuse, and the outer lobe has a ciliate margin. Stamens amount to 7, rarely 9; the filaments are 15–30 mm (0.59–1.18 in) long and glabrous; anthers are ovate, elliptic or oblong, measuring 1.8 mm–2.4 mm × 1.2 mm–1.5 mm (0.07 in–0.09 in × 0.05 in–0.06 in). The pistil is 2.2–3.8 cm (0.87–1.50 in) long and glabrescent; the ovaries are 2–10 mm (0.08–0.39 in) and glabrescent; the style is 15–22 mm (0.59–0.87 in) long; the stigma is capitate, measuring about 15–30 mm (0.59–1.18 in); ovules amount to 5–12.

The fruits are pods, compressed, oblong-lanceolate, measuring 20 cm–25 cm × 4.5 cm–7 cm (7.87 in–9.84 in × 1.77 in–2.76 in) and up to 5 mm (0.2 in) in thickness; the base is cuneate or obliquely rounded, the apex is straight or shortly curved, acute, up to 1 cm (0.39 in) long beaked; dried valves are coiled, woody, with distinct, straight and loosely reticulate veins on the outer surface, without indument; there are up to 5 pods per corymb. The stalk is 2–5 cm (0.79–1.97 in) long. Seeds amount to 5-10 per pod and are varied in shape, being circular, elliptic, obovate, or unequal; they measure 2.5 cm–4 cm × 15 cm–2 cm (0.98 in–1.57 in × 5.91 in–0.79 in), are compressed, 1.5–3 mm (0.06–0.12 in) thick, brown, and glabrous.

== Taxonomy ==
Saraca thailandica was first described by Thai botanists Wittaya Pongamornkul, Prateep Panyadee, Nattee Muangyen of the Queen Sirikit Botanic Garden and Angkhana Inta of Chiang Mai University in 2021 in the Thai Journal of Botany.

S. thailandica was initially found to be similar to S. dives and S. thaipingensis because of their distinct, large bracts, but differed from them by its more or less persistent, erect blackish brown mature bracteoles and number of stamens.

== Distribution and habitat ==
The trees were first observed in Mae Hong Son province and is considered endemic to Thailand, but it may also grow in Myanmar. They tend to grow in mountainous evergreen forests, in semi-shade, along streams, at altitudes of 1,040–1,400 m (3,412–4,593 ft) above sea level. The trees were assessed using GeoCAT software and it was determined that its conservation status is endangered. It had an estimated extent of occurrence of about 400 km^{2} (154 sq mi) and an area of occupancy of about 16 km^{2} (6 sq mi). While it was found that the plants are common in their habitat, their distribution is not well known from other areas and it was determined that further distribution information is needed for a formal assessment.

== Ecology ==
Saraca thailandica flowers from August to September and fruits from December to March.

== Uses ==
The seeds are edible; the S'gaw people, a subgroup of the Karen people, who know the tree as ta na (Thai: ตะนา) grill the young pods and the seeds are then eaten as a side-dish vegetable with chili dip or were crushed with chili dip. The bark is also used for dyeing textiles red.
