= Isooncodine =

Names
- IUPAC name 8-Methoxy-4-methyl-1H-indeno[1,2-b]pyridine-5,7-dione

Identifiers
CAS Number	122890-43-1
3D model (JSmol)	Interactive image
ChemSpider	4589272
PubChem CID	5487241
UNII	FJ5C9B526C
CompTox Dashboard (EPA)	DTXSID80924311
- InChI: InChI=1S/C14H11NO3/c1-7-3-4-15-13-8-6-11(18-2)10(16)5-9(8)14(17)12(7)13/h3-6,15H,1-2H3 Key: SQANFQYDLCUUNK-UHFFFAOYSA-N
- SMILES: CC1=C2C(=C3C=C(C(=O)C=C3C2=O)OC)NC=C1

Properties
Chemical formula	C_{14}H_{11}NO_{3}
Molar mass	241.246 g·mol^{−1}
Appearance	Yellowish amorphous powder
- Except where otherwise noted, data are given for materials in their standard state (at 25 °C [77 °F], 100 kPa). Infobox references

Isooncodine is an anticholinergic alkaloid. It was first synthesized in 1989 because it is an isomer of oncodine, an azafluorenone alkaloid derived from Meiogyne monosperma. It was first derived from the leaves of Polyalthia longifolia.
