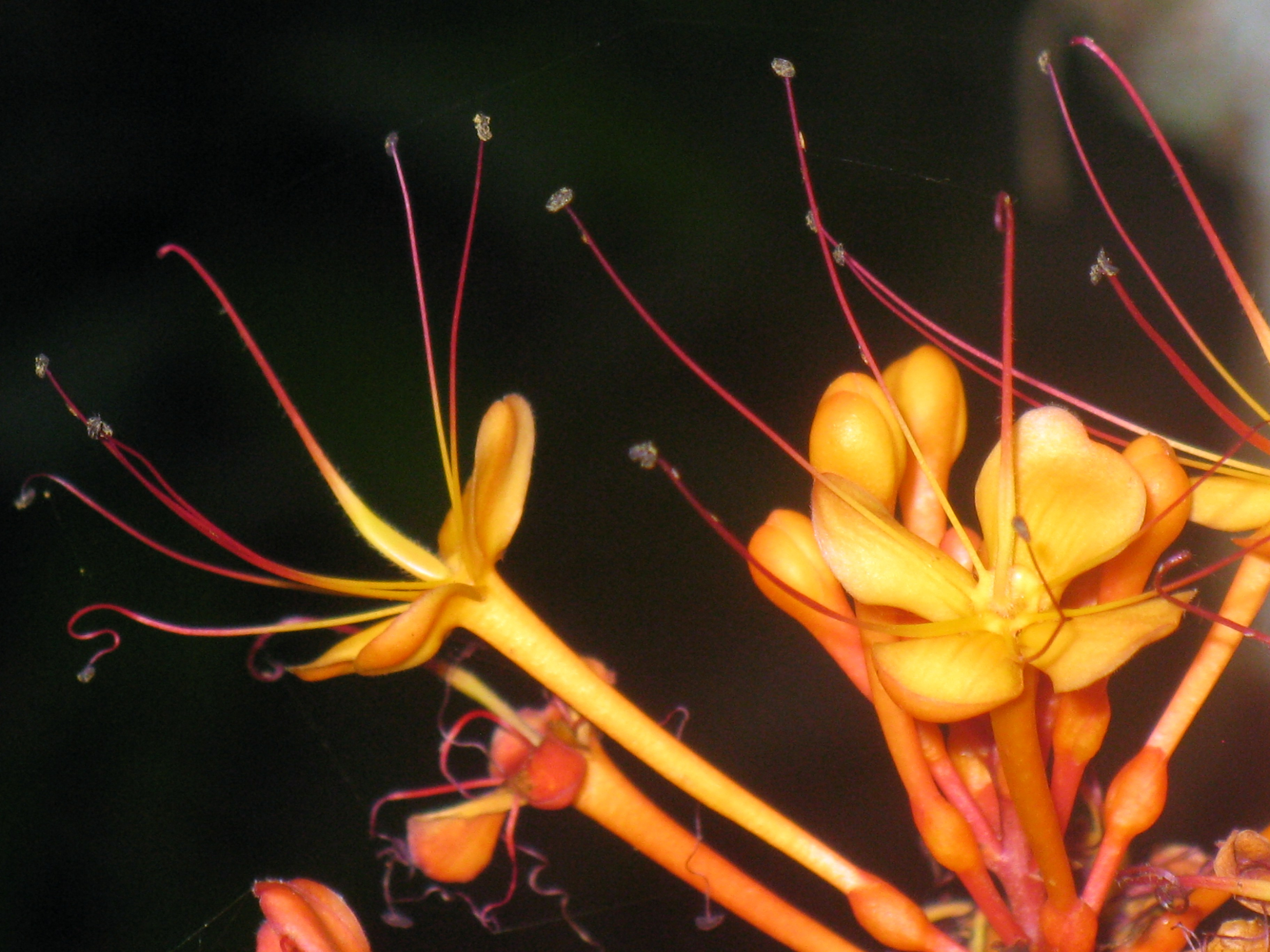
- Saraca asoca

Scientific classification
- Kingdom: Plantae
- Clade: Tracheophytes
- Clade: Angiosperms
- Clade: Eudicots
- Clade: Rosids
- Order: Fabales
- Family: Fabaceae
- Subfamily: Detarioideae
- Tribe: Saraceae
- Genus: Saraca; L. (1767)

Species
- 12; see text

Synonyms
- Celebnia Noronha (1790), nom. nud.; Jonesia Roxb. (1795)

= Saraca =

Genus of legumes

Saraca L. is a genus of flowering plants in the family Fabaceae (legume family) of about 20 plant species of trees native to the lands from India and Sri Lanka to Indochina, southern China Malesia, and New Guinea.

This plant can be grown outdoors in distinctly warm humid climates, and prefer a moist, well-drained soil with plenty of organic matter. It can also be grown within greenhouses. The trees themselves are grown for their clustered, upturned flowers in yellow, orange or red. The tree's flowers lack petals, having brightly colored sepals, and have stamens projecting up to eight inches long. The leaves are pinnate, with paired leaflets. Typically, these trees are accustomed to the shade of other trees. Most species of Saraca are associated with particular bodies of water. The species Saraca asoca is believed to be the tree under which Buddha was born. Red saraca is the provincial tree of Yala province, Thailand.

== Species ==
12 species are accepted:

- Saraca asoca (Roxb.) W.J.de Wilde – ashoka tree
- Saraca celebica W.J.de Wilde
- Saraca declinata (Jack) Miq.
- Saraca dives Pierre
- Saraca griffithiana Prain
- Saraca hullettii Prain
- Saraca indica L.
- Saraca monodelpha W.J.de Wilde
- Saraca schmidiana J.E.Vidal
- Saraca thailandica Pongam., Panyadee & Inta
- Saraca thaipingensis Cantley ex Prain
- Saraca tubiflora W.J.de Wilde

== Pests ==
Saraca indica is host to the peacock mite Tuckerella channabasavannai.
