= Sakya Muni Buddha Gaya Temple =

Buddhist monastery in Singapore

Temple of 1,000 Lights
- 释迦牟尼菩提迦耶寺
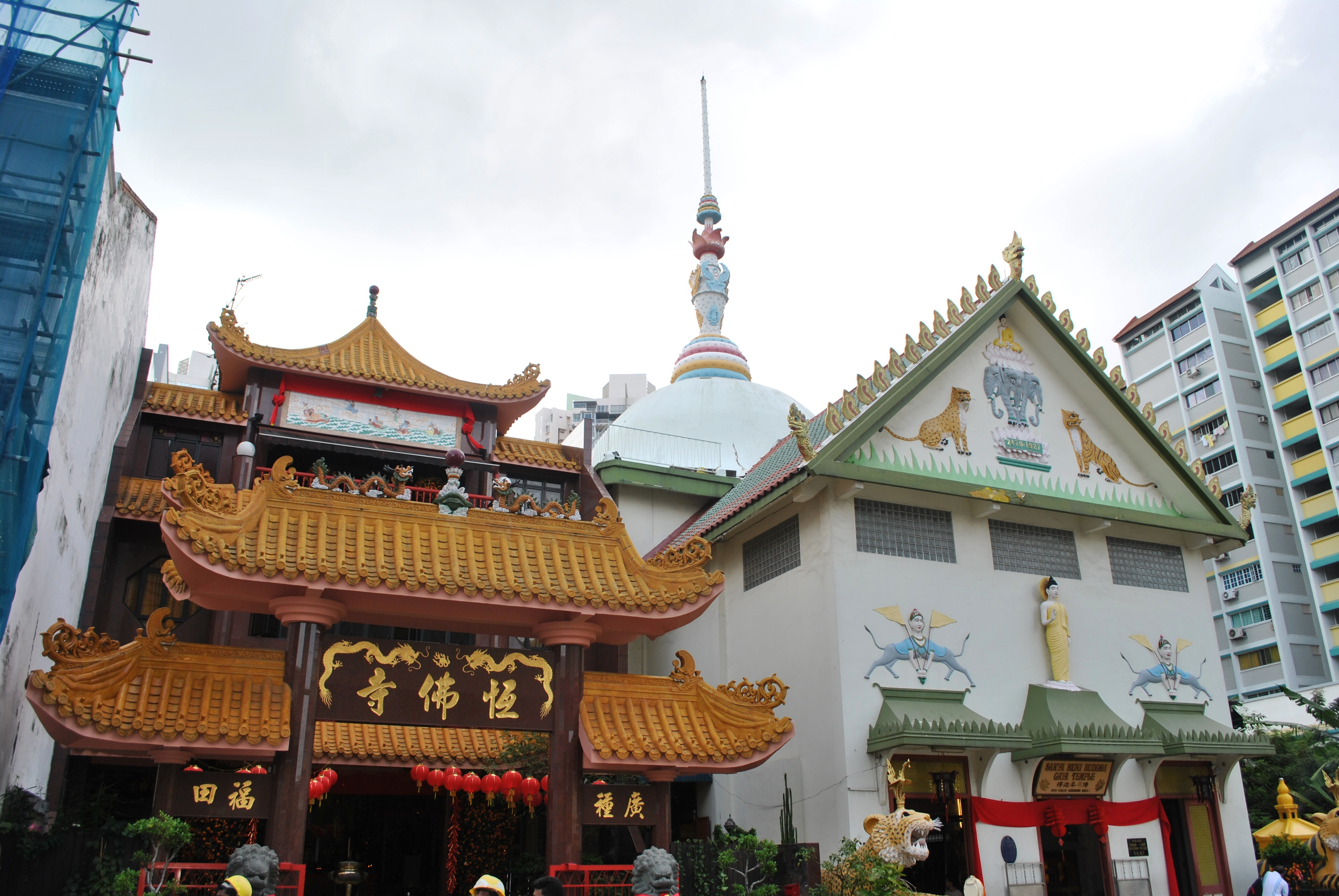
- Sakaya Muni Buddha Gaya Temple

- Location within Singapore

Monastery information
- Full name: Sakya Muni Buddha Gaya Temple
- Order: Theravada
- Established: 1927

People
- Founder: Venerable Vutthisara

Site
- Location: Race Course Road, Singapore
- Coordinates: 1°18′53″N 103°51′24.7″E

Sakya Muni Buddha Gaya Temple (Chinese: 释迦牟尼菩提迦耶寺) is a Buddhist monastery in Singapore. The temple was originally set up by Venerable Vutthisara of Thailand. The present premises are located at Race Course Road in Singapore.

== History ==
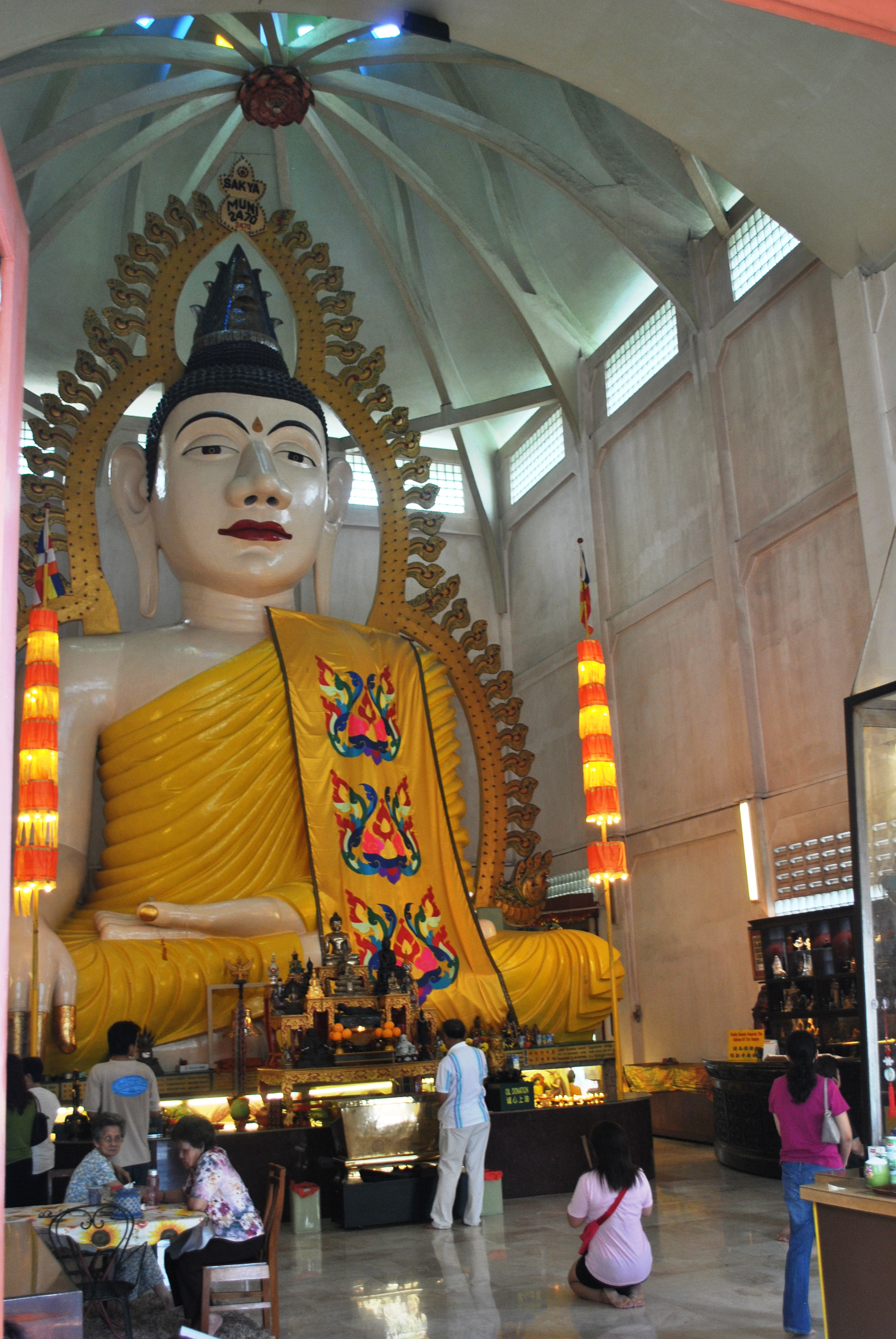
The 15-meter high statue of the seated Buddha

The Sakya Muni Buddha Gaya Temple was founded in 1927 by a Thai monk known as Ven Vutthisara. The temple grew in popularity and, in 1930, Ven Vutthisasara built the present temple building with a donation from Aw Boon Haw and Aw Boon Par.

== Influences ==
There are strong Thai influences in the architecture and decor.

== Buddha Statue ==
The Sakya Muni Buddha Gaya Temple is one of the most prominent and widely visited Buddhist temples in Singapore, often referred to as the Temple of 1,000 Lights. It features a 15-meter high statue of a seated Buddha, which weighs nearly 300 tons, as well as many smaller Buddha images and murals depicting the life of Gautama Buddha. The large central statue is surrounded by a stylized aura made of numerous light bulbs— often lit with a donation towards the temple(approach the friendly staff to request)—from which the temple derives its nickname. In a small room beneath the altar is an image of a reclining Buddha, Buddha towards the end of his life, under a Yellow Saraka Tree.

On Vesak Day, the annual holiday celebrating the birth and enlightenment of Lord Buddha, devotees donate money to the temple and in exchange are allowed to place gold leaf onto a small statue of the Buddha. As the day wears on, the Buddha statue is almost entirely covered in a fresh layer of gold leaves.

The temple is open between 8.00 am and 4.30 pm daily. Admission is free.

== See also ==
- Buddhism in Singapore
