= Saraca griffithiana =

Scientific classification
- Kingdom: Plantae
- Clade: Tracheophytes
- Clade: Angiosperms
- Clade: Eudicots
- Clade: Rosids
- Order: Fabales
- Family: Fabaceae
- Genus: Saraca
- Species: S. griffithiana

Binomial name
- Saraca griffithiana Prain

Species of legume

Saraca griffithiana (in the family Fabaceae Lindl.) is a tree native to Yunnan Province of China and also to Burma (Myanmar). It is a forest tree sometimes attaining a height of 18 m (54 feet). It can be distinguished from the related Saraca dives Pierre by its short bracts less than 5 mm long, and by its articulate petioles.

Saraca griffithiana Prain, It was first described and published J. Asiat. Soc. Bengal, Pt. 2, Nat. Hist. Vol.66 on page 491 in 1897.
