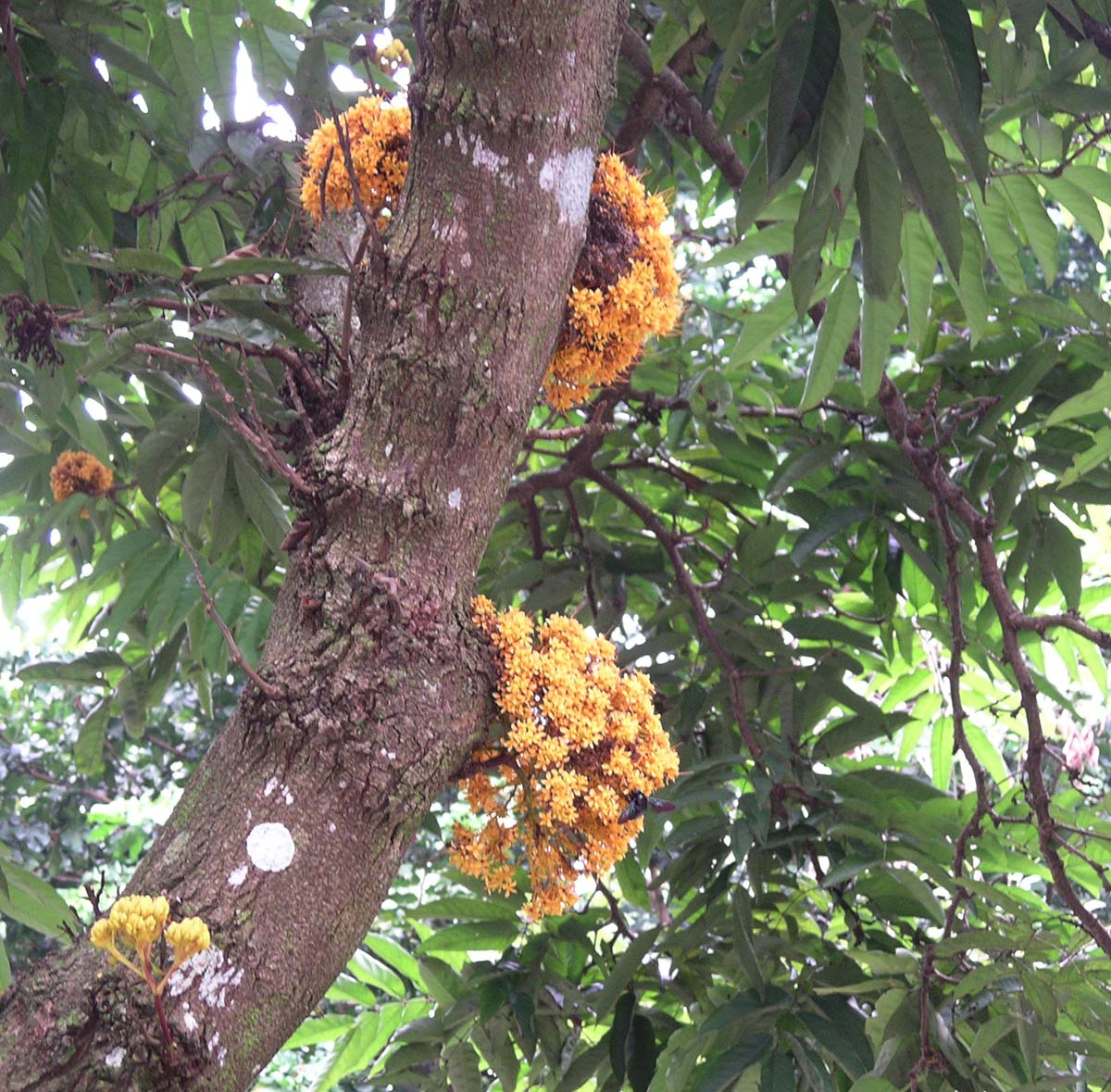

Conservation status
- Least Concern (IUCN 3.1)

Scientific classification
- Kingdom: Plantae
- Clade: Embryophytes
- Clade: Tracheophytes
- Clade: Spermatophytes
- Clade: Angiosperms
- Clade: Eudicots
- Clade: Rosids
- Order: Fabales
- Family: Fabaceae
- Genus: Saraca
- Species: S. declinata

Binomial name
- Saraca declinata (Jack) Miq.

Synonyms
- Jonesia declinata Jack; Jonesia javanica Blume ex Miq.; Jonesia macroptera Miq.; Jonesia palembanica Miq.; Saraca biglandulosa Pierre; Saraca crassifolia Ridl.; Saraca elegans Ridl.; Saraca elmeri Ridl.; Saraca lanceolata Merr.; Saraca longistyla Ridl.; Saraca macroptera Miq.; Saraca macroptera var. parviflora Prain; Saraca obtusifolia Miq.; Saraca palembanica (Miq.) Baker; Saraca thorelii Gagnep.; Saraca zollingeriana Miq.

= Saraca declinata =

Red saraca

Species of legume

Saraca declinata, the red saraca or sorrowless tree, is a tree in genus Saraca belonging to the family Fabaceae. The species is found both in Thailand and Burma, and has been introduced in Ceylon. In Cambodia, it is called Cheay Sbay (lit. 'Veil rim' - Khmer: ជាយស្បៃ) or Kam roteh thum (កាំរទេះធំ).

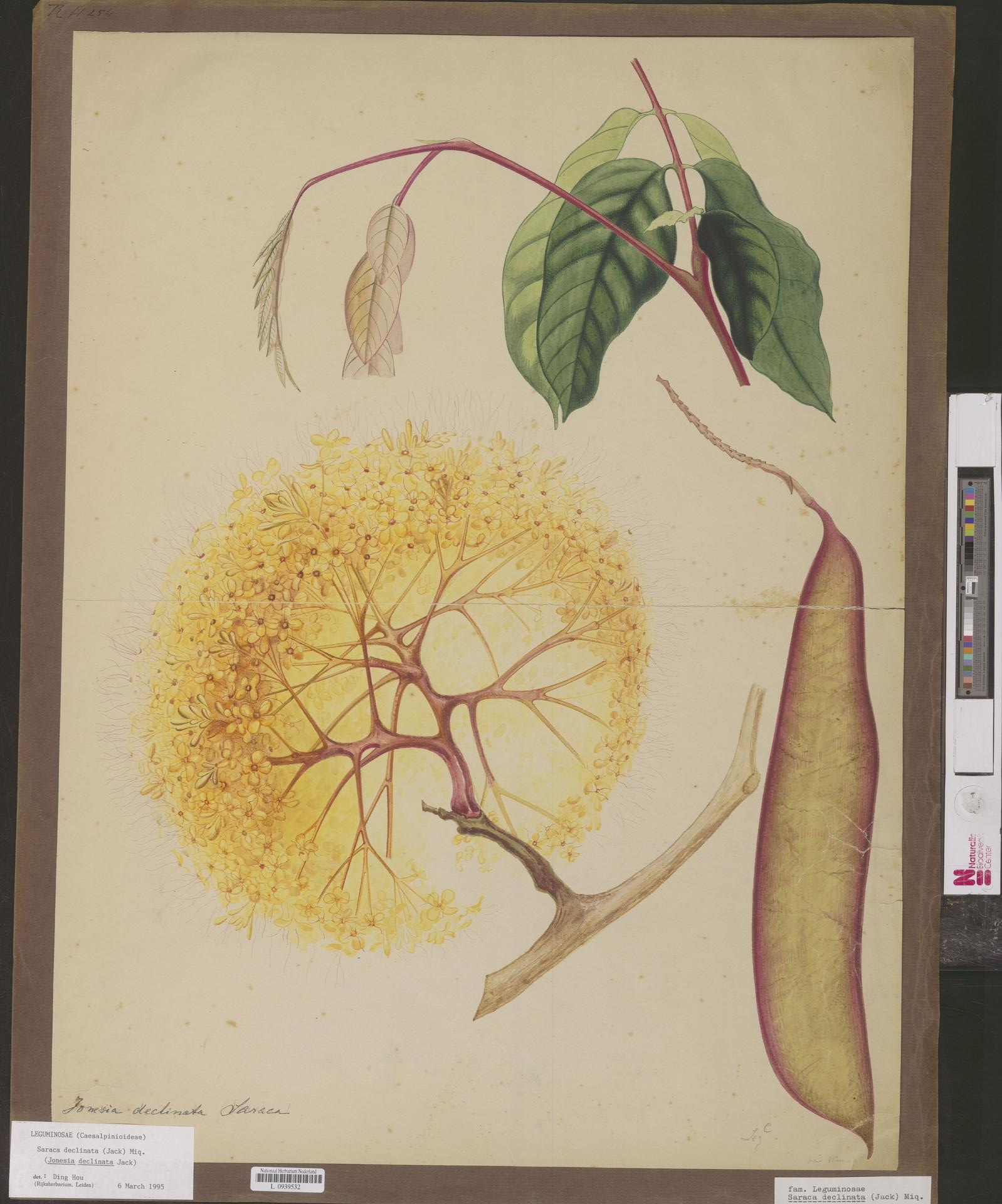
J. van Aken: Saraca declinata (Jack) Miquel, around 1865.
