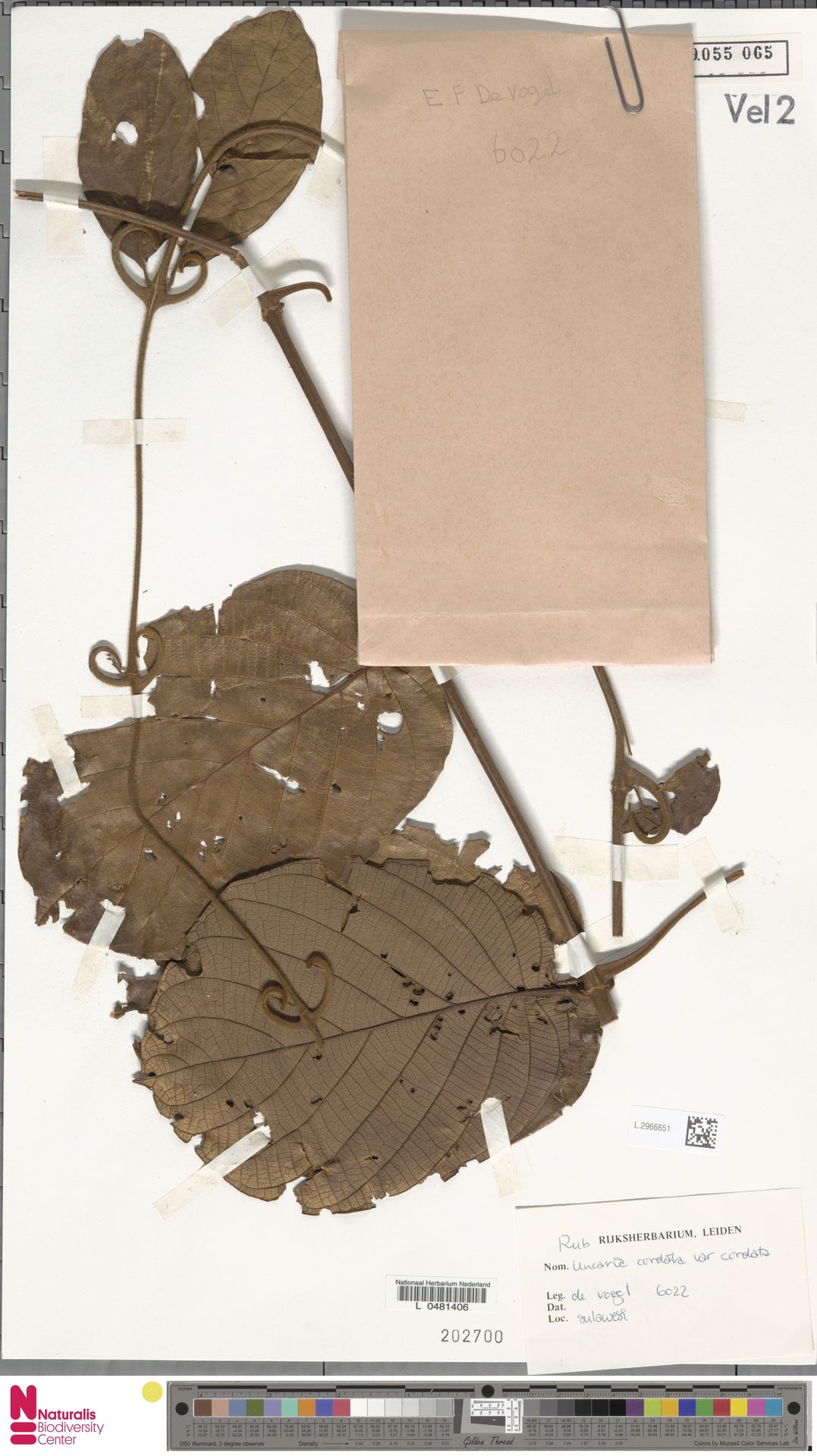

Conservation status
- Near Threatened (IUCN 2.3)

Scientific classification
- Kingdom: Plantae
- Clade: Tracheophytes
- Clade: Angiosperms
- Clade: Eudicots
- Clade: Rosids
- Order: Fabales
- Family: Fabaceae
- Genus: Saraca
- Species: S. celebica

Binomial name
- Saraca celebica de wilde

= Saraca celebica =

Species of legume

Saraca celebica, commonly known locally as Sejenis Ashoka, in is a species of plant in the family Fabaceae. It is a tree found only in Sulawesi in Indonesia.

== Description ==
Saraca celebica is a tree which grows up to 8 metres (26 feet) in height. Leaves are 3-4 rows of jugate leaflets, growing 15–35 centimetres (5.9–13.8 inches) long, with a short petiole, measuring 1–2.5 cm (0.39–0.98 in) long and with a rachis 7–24.5 cm (2.8–9.6 in) long, blackish-brown when dry. Leaflets are subcoriaceous and glabrous, elliptic-oblong to oblong-lanceolate, and rarely ovate, measuring 12–25 cm (4.7–9.8 in) long by 5–8.5 cm (2.0–3.3 in) wide with 4–8-millimetre (0.16–0.31-inch) petioles. Leaflets above are usually not larger than the lower ones and leaf bases are often accompanied by small marginal glands.

Flowers are orange-red and fragrant. Corymbes are erect, compact, about 5–20 cm (2.0–7.9 in) wide, glabrous, with branches up to 2 mm (0.079 in) thick. Bracts and bracteoles are caducous, subequal in size and shape, fusiform, ovate or obovate, with an obtuse or acute tips, growing about 1–2 mm (0.039–0.079 in) long and 1–1.5 mm (0.039–0.059 in) wide. Calyxes are 10–15 mm (0.39–0.59 in), rarely 20 mm (0.79 in), long, 0.5–1.5 mm (0.020–0.059 in) thick. Pedicels are 8–18 mm (0.31–0.71 in) long for the section between the calyx tube and bracteoles. Calyx lobes are oval or oblong, 5–10 mm (0.20–0.39 in) long by 2–8 mm (0.079–0.315 in) wide, with an obtuse apex. Stamens amount to 4, rarely 6. Stamens have filaments growing 10–27 mm (0.39–1.06 in) long and anthers measuring about 2 mm (0.079 in). Ovary stems are 4–5 mm (0.16–0.20 in) long, with ovaries being 3–5 mm (0.12–0.20 in) long. Styles are 10–16 mm (0.39–0.63 in) long.

The fruits are pods, numbering 1-6 per corymb, woody, oblong to oblong-lanceolate, measuring about 15 cm–18 cm × 5 cm–6 cm (5.9 in–7.1 in × 2.0 in–2.4 in), being up to about 16 mm (0.63 in) thick; the base is obliquely cuneate and the top is acute-acuminate, 15–20 mm (0.59–0.79 in) beaked, 5-6 seeded. Dry mature valves are somewhat coiled, about 1.5 mm (0.059 in) thick, with the inside containing traces of seed compartments. Immature pods are flat with somewhat thickened margins. Mature seeds are suborbicular, more or less depressed at the side of the hilum, about 37 mm × 31 mm × 12 mm (1.46 in × 1.22 in × 0.47 in), hard, with a rounded edge, and a glossy dark brown surface. The hilum itself is small, about 2 mm (0.079 in).

== Taxonomy ==
Saraca celibata was identified and described by Willem Jan Jacobus Oswald de Wilde in the Dutch journal of botany Blumea in 1967. A description of the fruits was missing from the original description, this was included in a 1981 Blumea article describing the then newly identified S. monadelpha.

=== Etymology ===
Celibata refers to Celebes, the name given to the island of Sulawesi by Portuguese explorers, to which it is endemic. A direct translation of Celebes is unclear, but it might be considered a Portuguese rendering of the native name "Sulawesi".

== Distribution and habitat ==
The trees were observed in central and east Sulawesi and were common along the Larona River, flowing from Lake Towuti. They grow along streams at a low altitude up to about 100 metres (330 feet).

== Ecology ==
S. saraca was observed to flower abundantly in June; collections of flowers were made in September and October. Mature seeds appeared to be rare in herbarium collections.
