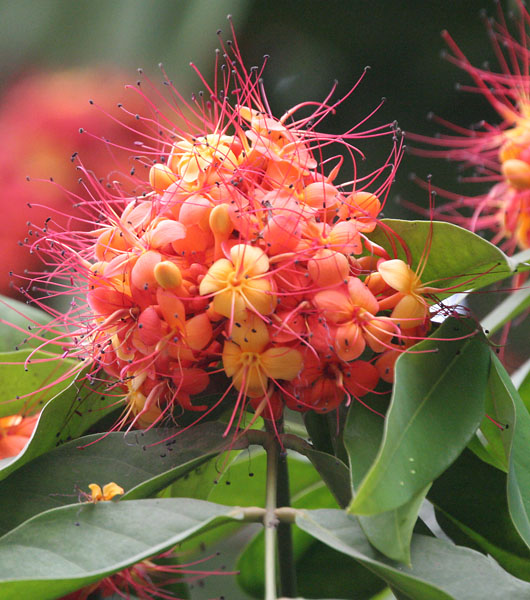
- Ashoka flower cluster

Conservation status
- Vulnerable (IUCN 2.3)

Scientific classification
- Kingdom: Plantae
- Clade: Tracheophytes
- Clade: Angiosperms
- Clade: Eudicots
- Clade: Rosids
- Order: Fabales
- Family: Fabaceae
- Genus: Saraca
- Species: S. asoca

Binomial name
- Saraca asoca (Roxb.) Willd.

Synonyms
- Jonesia asoca Roxb.; Jonesia confusa Hassk.; Jonesia pinnata Willd.; Saraca confusa (Hassk.) Backer; Saraca indica sensu Bedd., non L.

= Saraca asoca =

Ashoka tree

Species of plant

Saraca asoca, commonly known as the ashoka tree (lit. "sorrow-less"), is a plant belonging to the Detarioideae subfamily of the Fabaceae family of plants (also referred to as the legume, pea, or bean family).

The tree is native to the Indian subcontinent, with its native range extending from Pakistan to the west, through India and Bangladesh to Myanmar in the east, and from Bhutan and Nepal in the north to Sri Lanka in the south. Within its native range, it is primarily growing in seasonally dry tropical forests.

It is an important tree to multiple cultural traditions across the Indian subcontinent and beyond.

The flower of ashoka tree is the state flower of the Indian state of Odisha.

== Description ==
The ashoka is a rain-forest tree. Its original distribution was in the central areas of the Deccan Plateau, as well as the middle section of the Western Ghats in the western coastal zone of the Indian subcontinent.

It is a small, erect evergreen tree, with deep green leaves growing in dense clusters.

Its flowering season is around February to April. The ashoka flowers come in heavy bunches. They are bright orange-yellow in color, turning red before wilting.

As a wild tree, the ashoka is a vulnerable species. It is becoming rarer in its natural habitat, but isolated wild ashoka trees are still to be found in the foothills of the central and eastern Himalayas, in scattered locations of the northern plains of India as well as on the west coast of the subcontinent near Mumbai.

There are a few varieties of the ashoka tree. One variety is larger and highly spreading. The columnar varieties are common in cultivation.

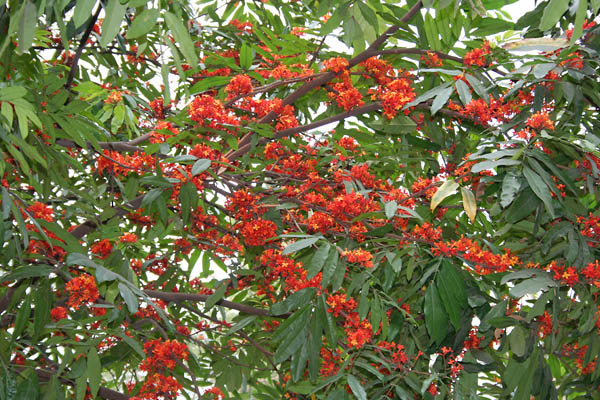
Leaves and flowers in Kolkata, West Bengal, India

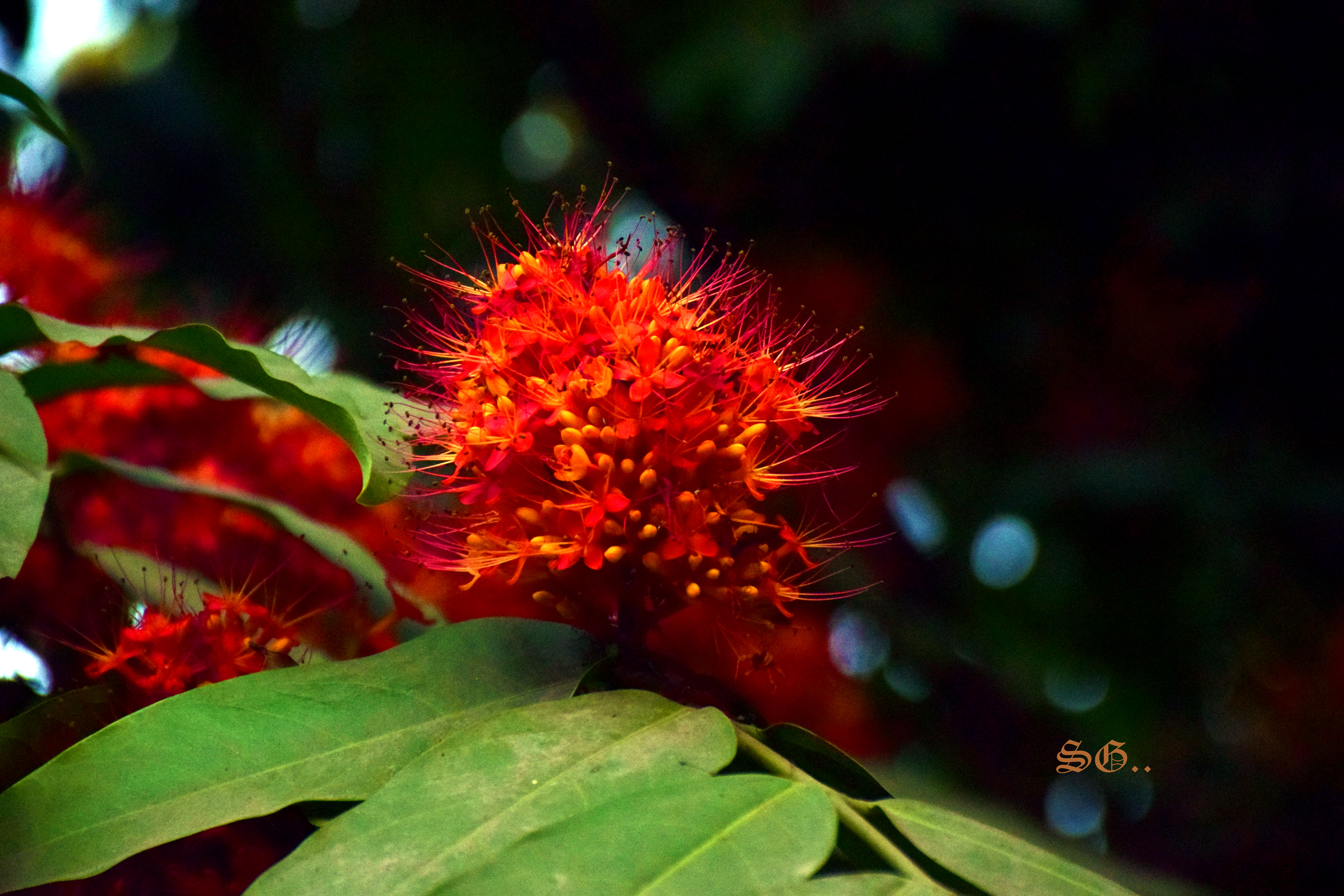
Ashoka blossom

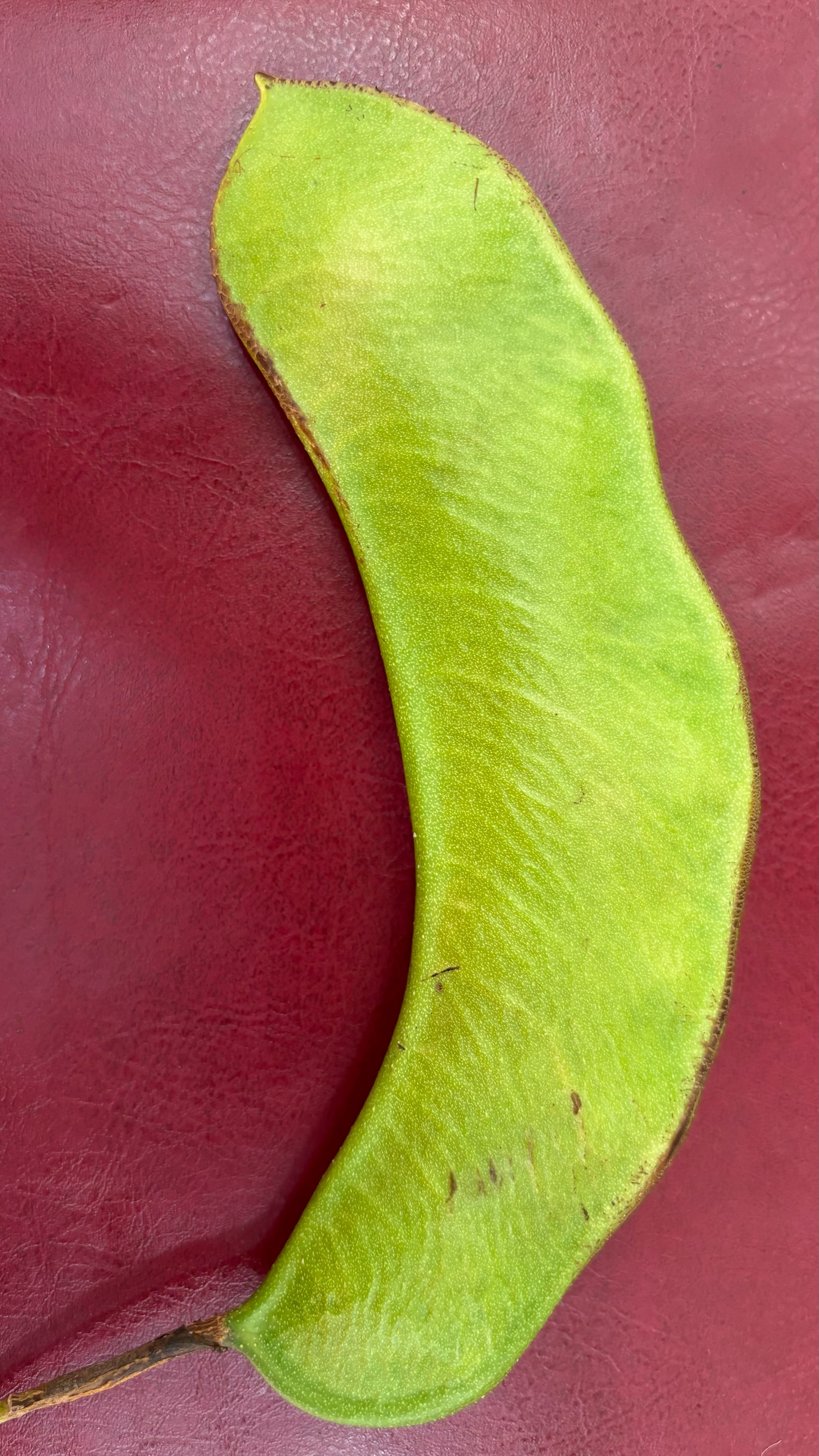
Fruit

== Mythology and tradition ==
The ashoka tree is used as a traditional medicinal plant. It is considered sacred throughout the Indian subcontinent, especially in India, Nepal and Sri Lanka. This tree has many folklorical, religious and literary associations in the region. Highly valued as well for its handsome appearance and the color and abundance of its flowers, the ashoka tree is often found in royal palace compounds and gardens as well as close to temples throughout India.

The ashoka tree is closely associated with the yakshi mythological beings. One of the recurring elements in Indian art, often found at gates of Buddhist and Hindu temples, is the sculpture of a yakshini with her foot on the trunk and her hands holding the branch of a flowering ashoka tree. As an artistic element, often the tree and the yakshi are subject to heavy stylization. Some authors hold that the young girl at the foot of this tree is based on an ancient tree deity related to fertility.

Yakshis under the ashoka tree were also important in early Buddhist monuments as a decorative element and are found in many ancient Buddhist archaeological sites. With the passing of the centuries the yakshi under the ashoka tree became a standard decorative element of Hindu Indian sculpture and was integrated into Indian temple architecture as salabhanjika, because there is often a confusion between the ashoka tree and the sal tree (Shorea robusta) in the ancient literature of the Indian subcontinent.

In Hinduism the ashoka is considered a sacred tree. Not counting a multitude of local traditions connected to it, the ashoka tree is worshipped in Chaitra, a month of the Hindu calendar. It is also associated with Kamadeva, the Hindu god of love, who included an ashoka blossom among the five flowers in his quiver, where ashoka represent seductive hypnosis. Hence, the ashoka tree is often mentioned in classical Indian religious and amorous poetry, having at least sixteen different names in Sanskrit referring to the tree or its flowers.

In Mahākāvya, or Indian epic poetry, the ashoka tree is mentioned in the Ramayana in reference to the Ashoka Vatika (garden of ashoka trees) where Hanuman first meets Sita.

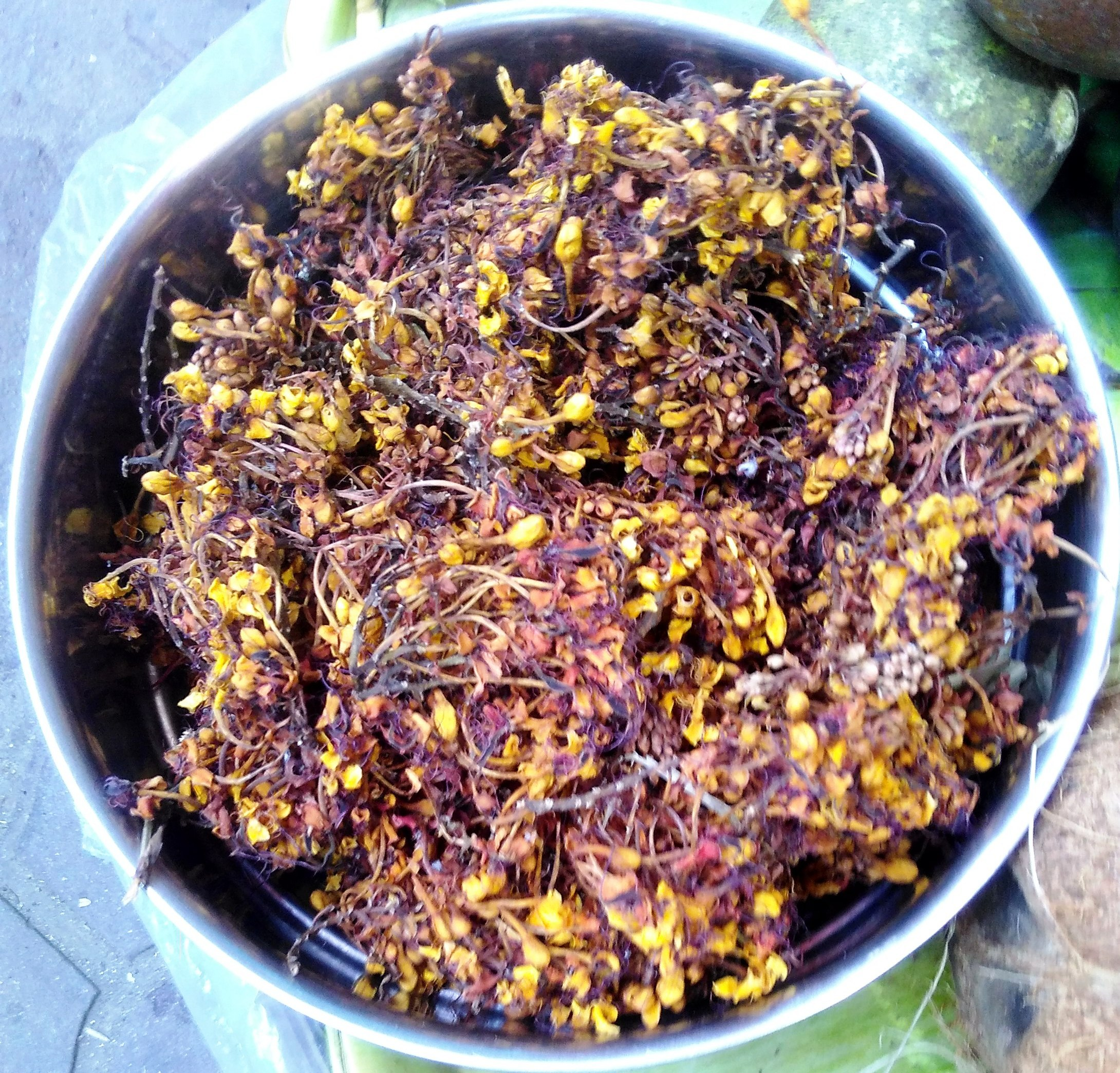
Dried ashoka flower (Saraca asoca) for selling in Kolkata market, India

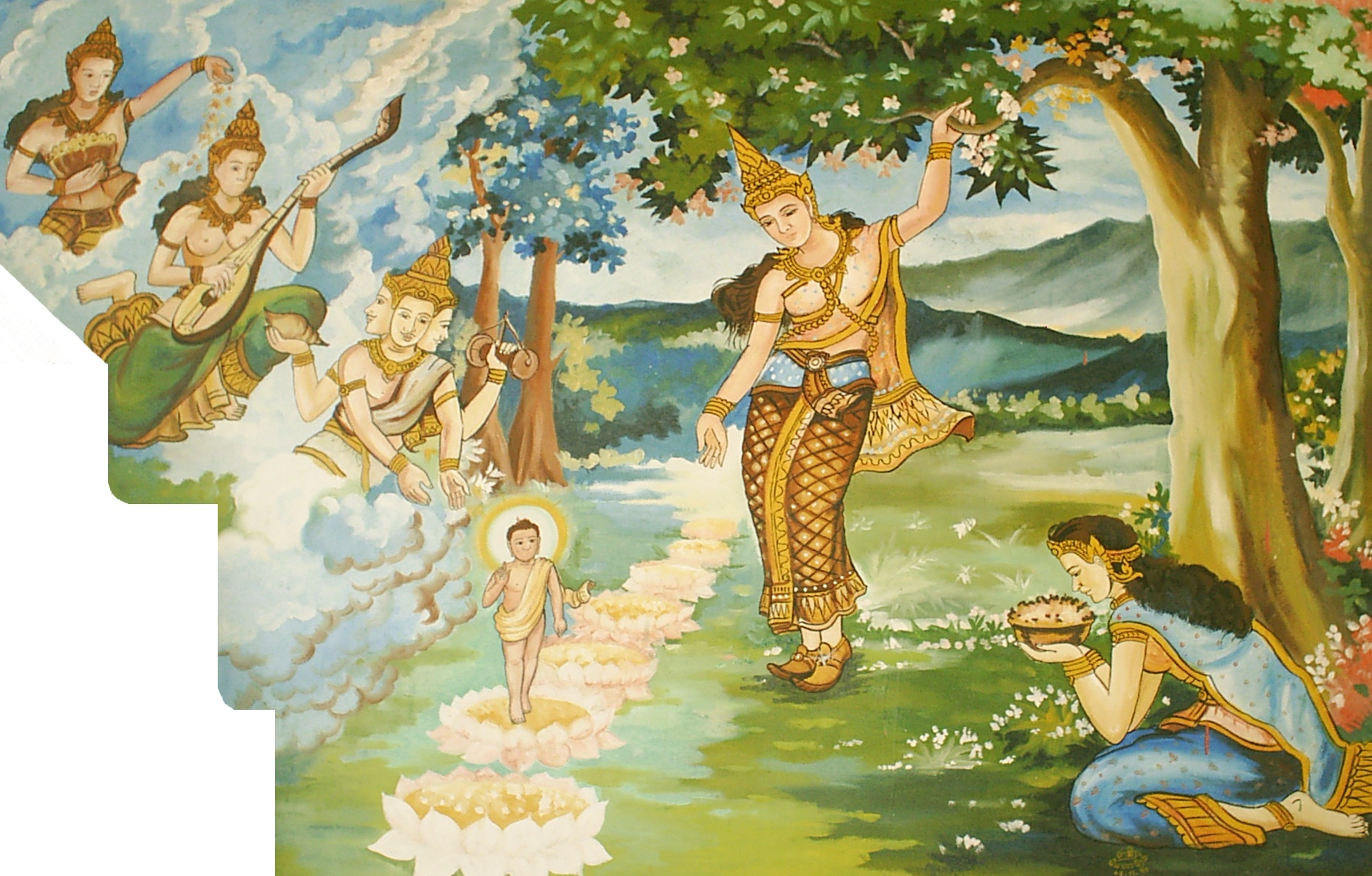
Queen Māyā giving birth to the Buddha

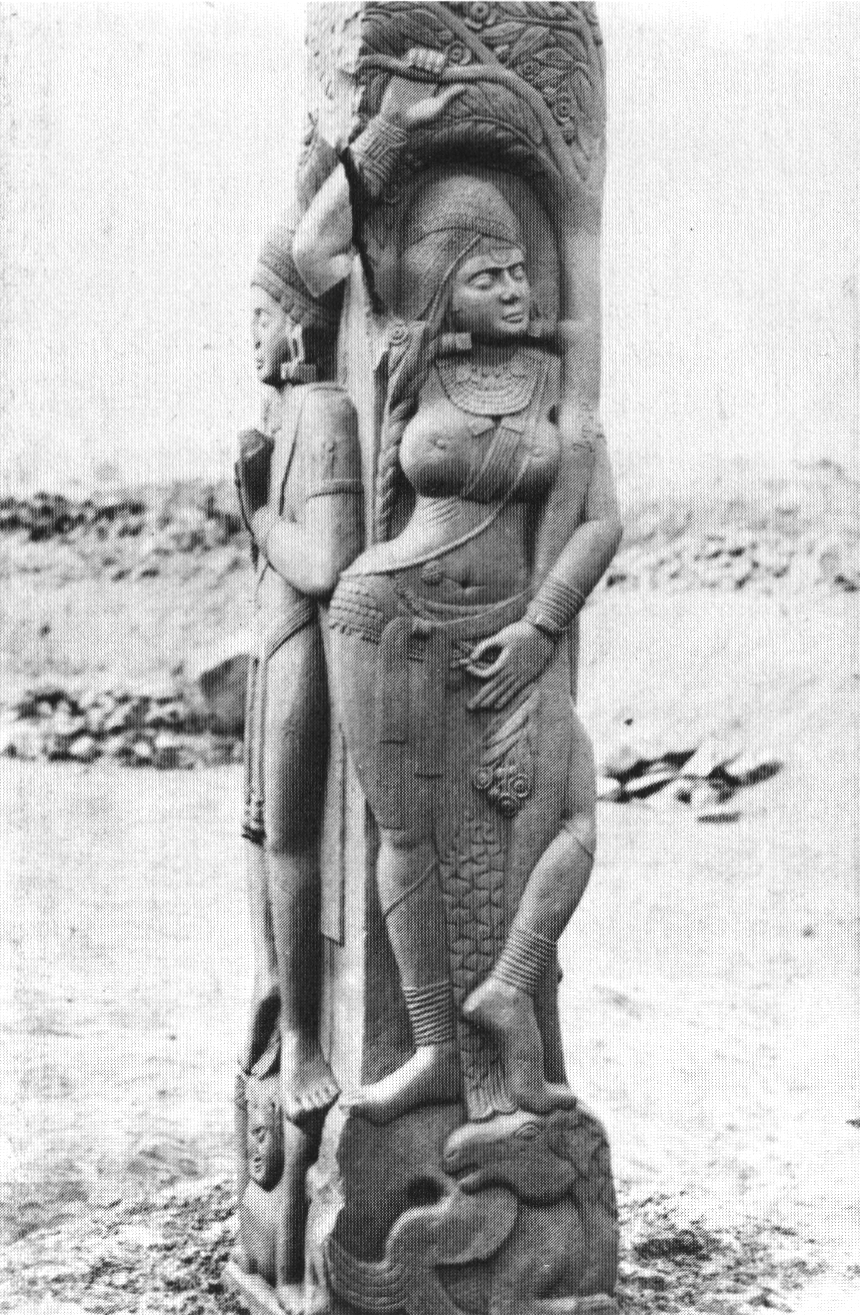
Yakshi under a stylized ashoka tree. Railing figure at Bharhut Stupa, 2nd century BC, India.

== Other trees called 'ashoka tree' ==
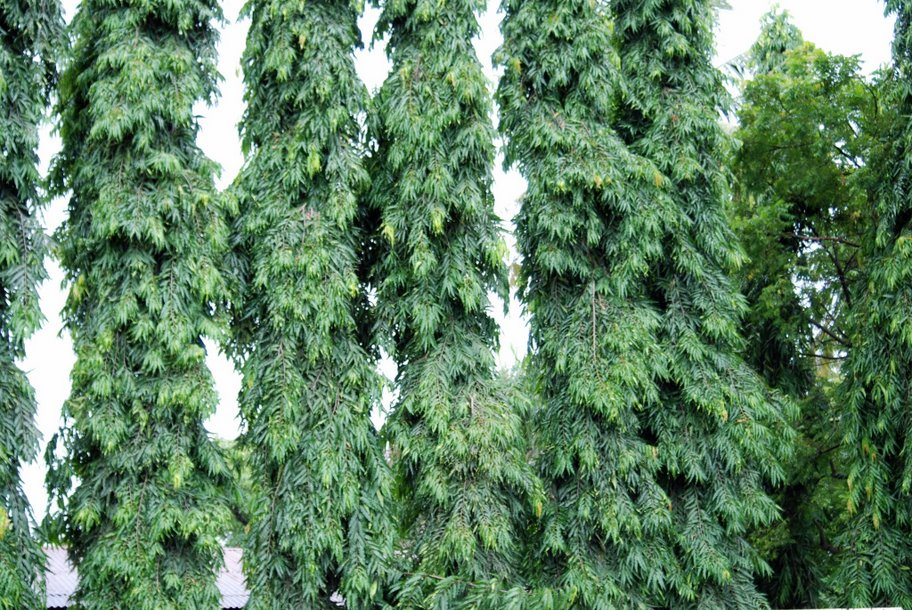
False ashoka

The ashoka tree is sometimes incorrectly known as Saraca indica.

A popular tree known as "false ashoka tree" or even as "ashoka tree", Polyalthia longifolia, is cultivated to resemble the growth pattern of erect pillar-like Mediterranean cypress trees. It is a popular park and garden plant, much used in landscaping on the Indian subcontinent, known also as Devadaar or Debdaru. This tree can easily be distinguished by its simple leaves and very different flowers. Ashoka flowers are red (initially orange in color) while P. longifolia flowers are apple green in color. Ashoka fruits look like broad beans containing multiple seeds while false ashoka fruits are small, spherical and contain only one seed. Ashoka trees are small in height, while false ashoka is taller.

== See also ==
- Indian epics
- Kurincippattu
- Shitala
- The birth of Buddha (Lalitavistara)
