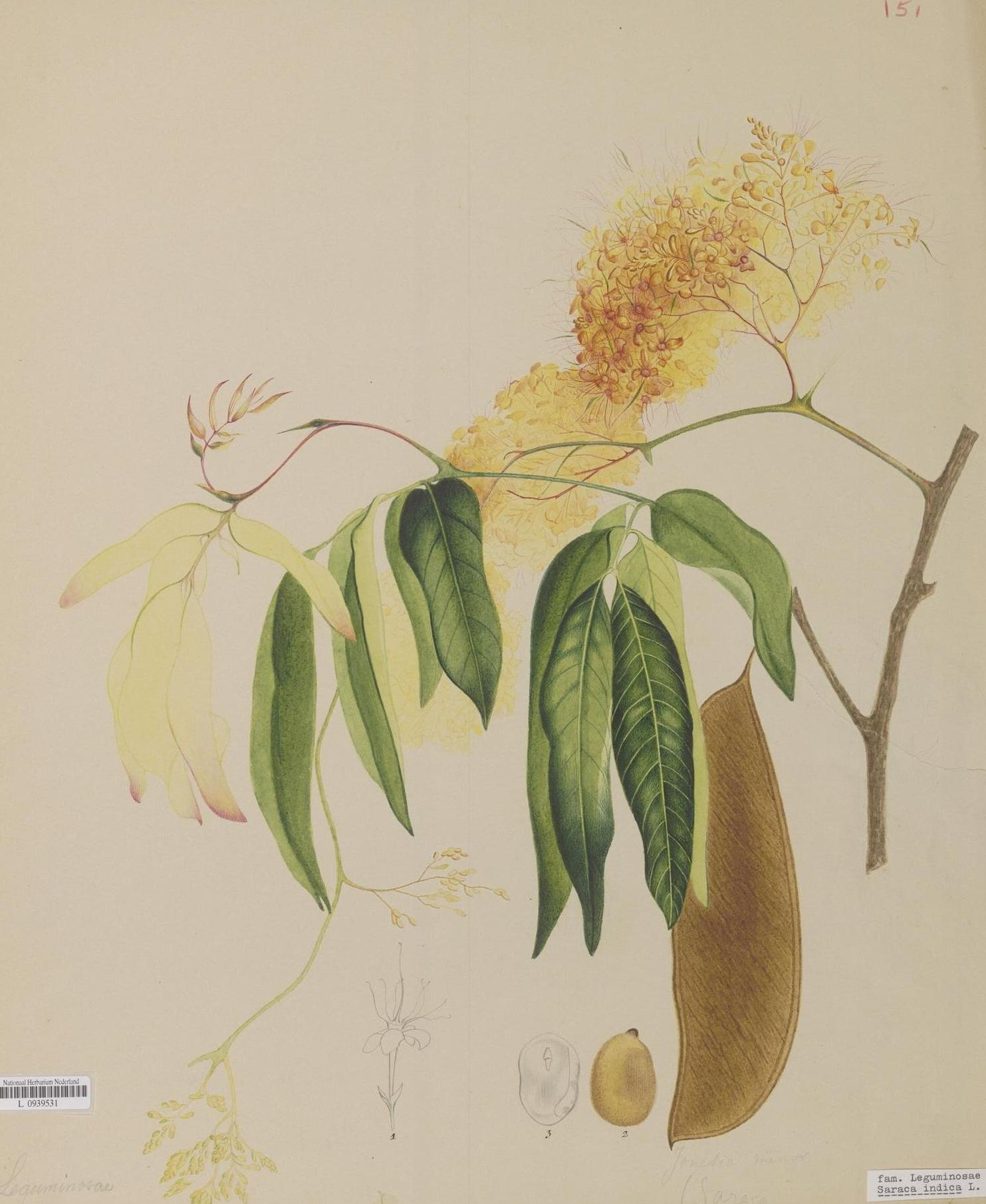

Conservation status
- Least Concern (IUCN 3.1)

Scientific classification
- Kingdom: Plantae
- Clade: Tracheophytes
- Clade: Angiosperms
- Clade: Eudicots
- Clade: Rosids
- Order: Fabales
- Family: Fabaceae
- Genus: Saraca
- Species: S. indica

Binomial name
- Saraca indica L.

Synonyms
- Jonesia asoca misapplied; Jonesia minor Zoll. & Moritzi; Saraca asoca misapplied; Saraca arborescens Burm.f.; Saraca bijuga Prain; Saraca harmandiana Pierre; Saraca minor (Zoll. & Moritzi) Miq.; Saraca pierreana Craib; Saraca zollingeriana "sensu Prain, non Miq."

= Saraca indica =

Ashoka tree

Species of plant

Saraca indica, commonly known as the asoka tree, ashok or simply asoca, is a species of tree in the family Fabaceae, subfamily Detarioideae. The species is native to most of Mainland Southeast Asia and Western Indonesia. It grows to a height of 20 metres (66 feet) and is known for its clusters of orange-yellow to red flowers. The original plant specimen from which Carl Linnaeus described the species came from Java, but the name S. indica has been generally incorrectly applied to S. asoca since 1869.

== Description ==
Saraca indica is an evergreen flowering tree which grows to about 20 metres (66 feet) in height, though some sources describe it as growing to 24 metres (79 feet). The trunk can reach up to 34 centimetres (13 inches) in diameter. The bark is dark brown to almost black in color and has a warty and uneven surface caused by lenticels. Fractures in the bark expose thin whitish layers.

The leaves are compound and paripinnate, each leaf has 2–4, sometimes 1–7, pairs of leaflets along a 7–25-centimetre (2.8–9.8-inch), sometimes up to 35-centimetre (14-inch), rachis. The leaflets are typically 15–20 centimetres (5.9–7.9 inches) long by 3.5–6 centimetres (1.4–2.4 inches) wide, sometimes 5–30 centimetres (2.0–11.8 inches) long by 1.5–11 centimetres (0.59–4.33 inches) wide. Leaflets may be elliptic to lanceolate in shape; their bases may be obtuse, rounded, cordate or cuneate; tips may be obtuse or acute, sometimes acuminate. The leaflet pairs closest to the leaf stalk are usually smaller than the rest. They have a glabrous surface; young leaves flush white, pink, or purple and hang pendulously, turning green as they mature and are brownish when dry.

Inflorescence is a 3–15-centimetre (1.2–5.9-inch) diameter corymb with slender branches, with apetalous, bisexual flowers with yellowish orange sepals. Bracts are 2–8 millimetres (0.079–0.315 inches) by 1.5–4.5 millimetres (0.059–0.177 inches) in size, ovate to oval shaped, and fugacious. Bracteoles are 3–8 millimetres (0.12–0.31 inches) long by 1.5–4 millimetres (0.059–0.157 inches), ovate to oval-oblong shaped, upright and spreading, may be persistent or fugacious when they fall off during maturity, and are orange-colored. The pedicel is 10–25 millimetres (0.39–0.98 inches) long, 5–10 millimetres (0.20–0.39 inches) long including the part above the bracteoles, and bibracteolate at the juncture with a long and narrow hypanthium. The receptacle is 7–16 millimetres (0.28–0.63 inches) long. The 4 petaloid sepals are 5–12 millimetres (0.20–0.47 inches) by 2–7 millimetres (0.079–0.276 inches) in size, obtuse or rounded at the tip and spreading, and orange-reddish in color. The stamens, 6–8 in total, sometimes 5–10, are exserted and conspicuous. The ovary is pubescent along the margins, with 6–8 ovules. Flowers may have a subtle fragrance. The trees have been observed to bloom several times a year.

The fruits are dry dehiscent woody legumes or pods, 6–25 centimetres (2.4–9.8 inches) long by 2–6 centimetres (0.79–2.36 inches) wide, oval or oblong-lanceolate in shape, beaked at the apex and cuneate or rounded at the base, and stipitate. The pods coil and are split when ripe. The seeds measure 4–5 by 2–2.75 centimetres (1.57–1.97 by 0.79–1.08 inches) and are 0.6–1.2 centimetres (0.24–0.47 inches) thick; they are ovoid-oblong in shape, sometimes reniform.

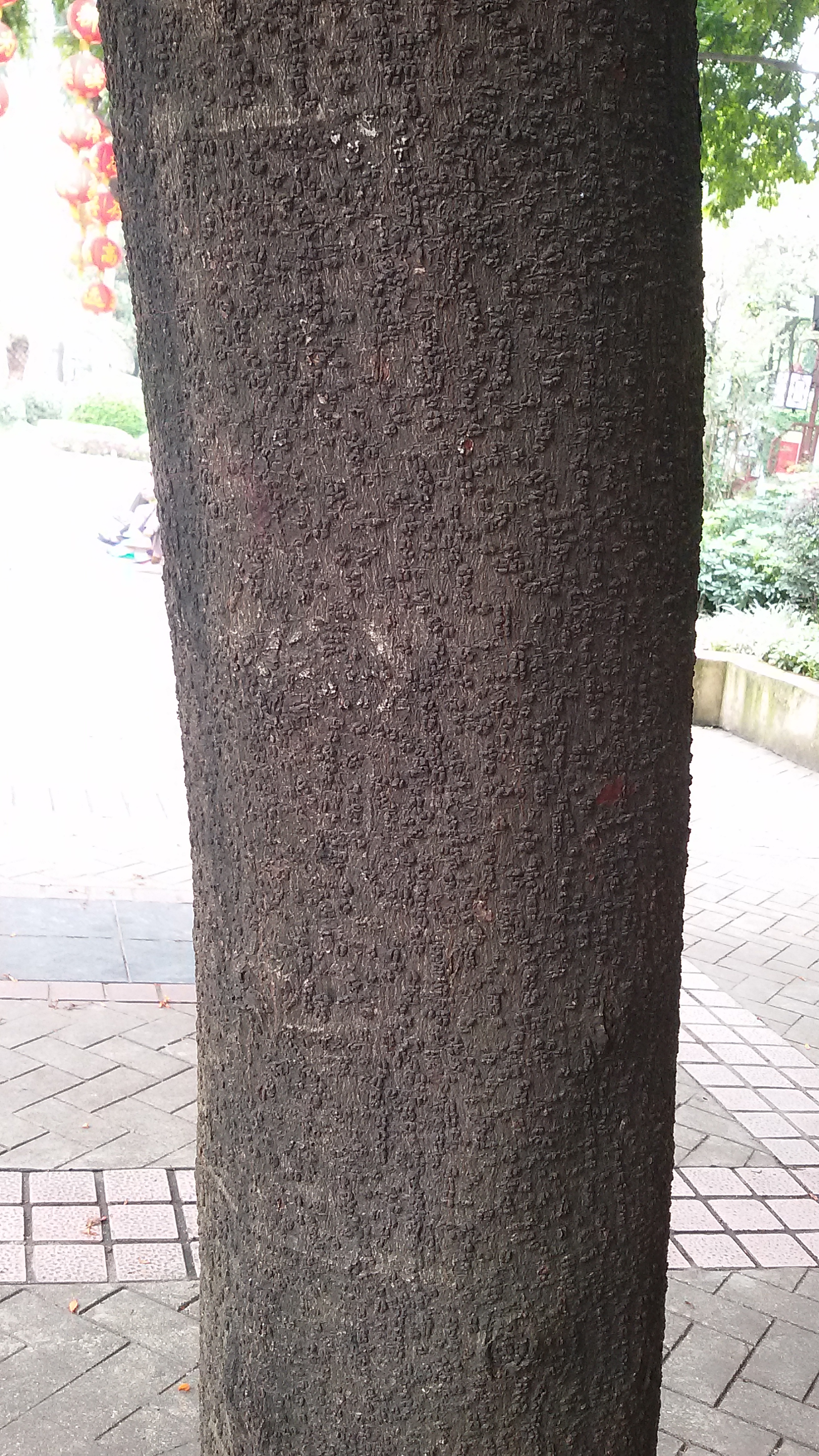
Saraca indica bark.

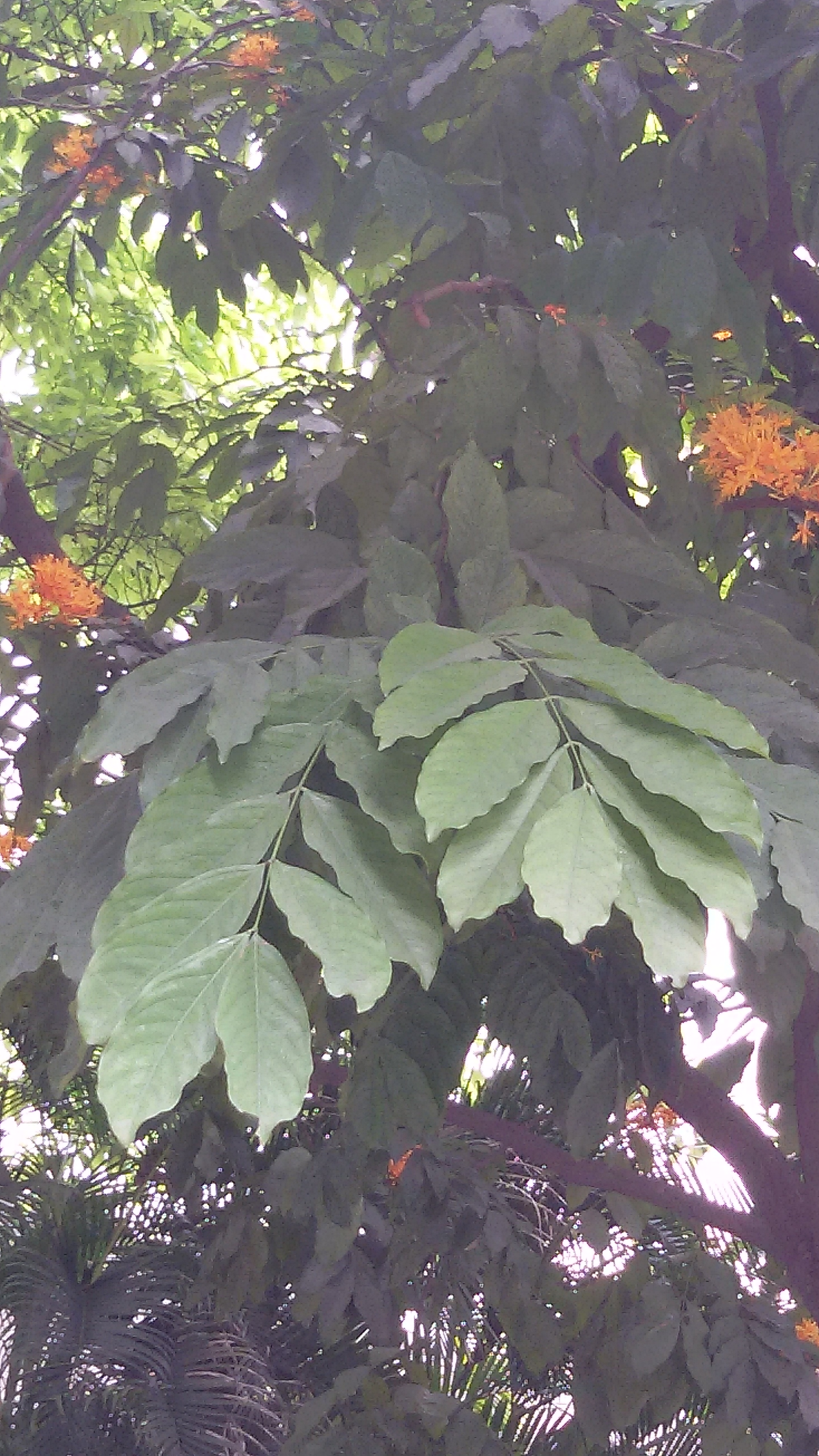
Saraca indica ovate leaves.

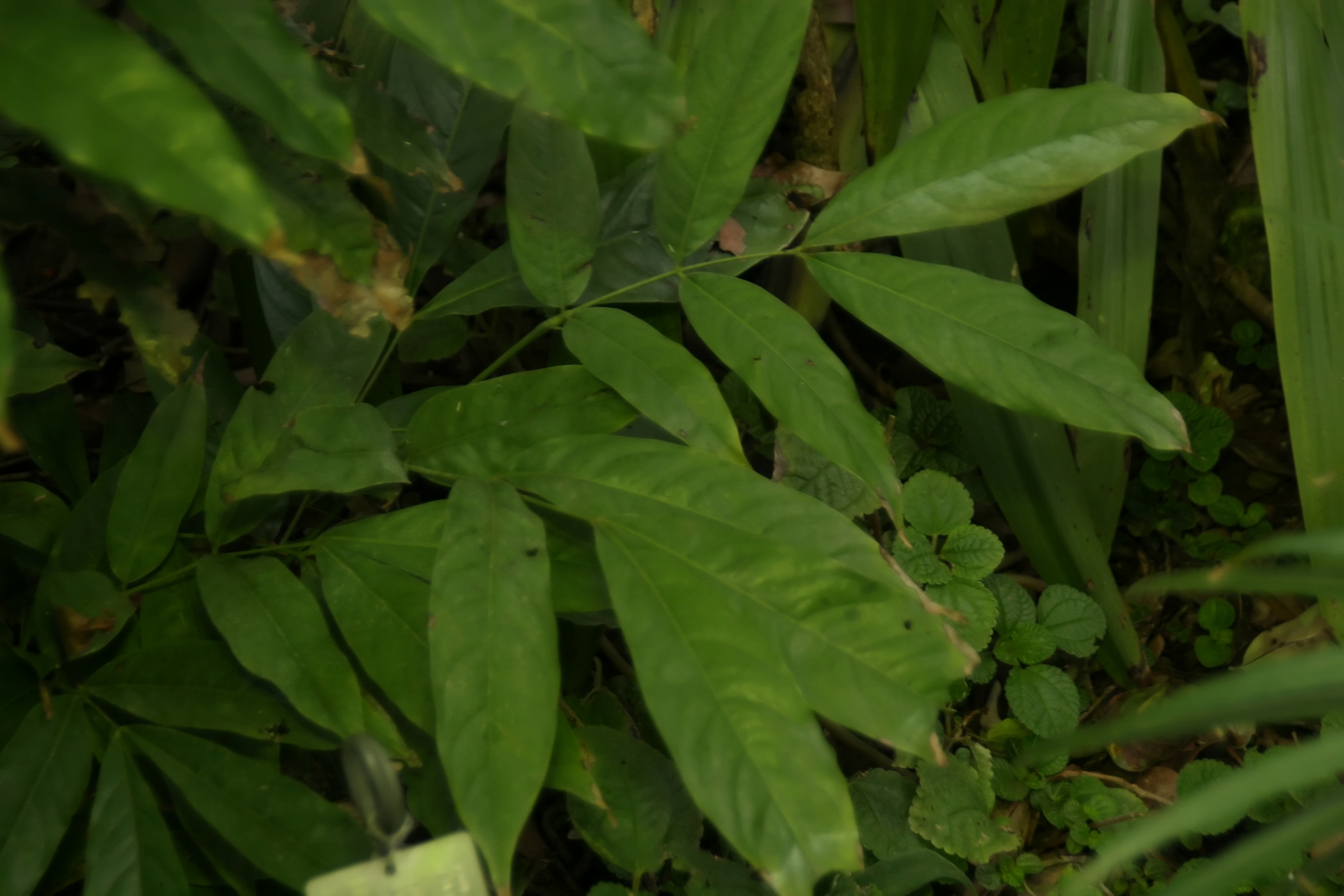
Saraca indica lanceolate leaves.

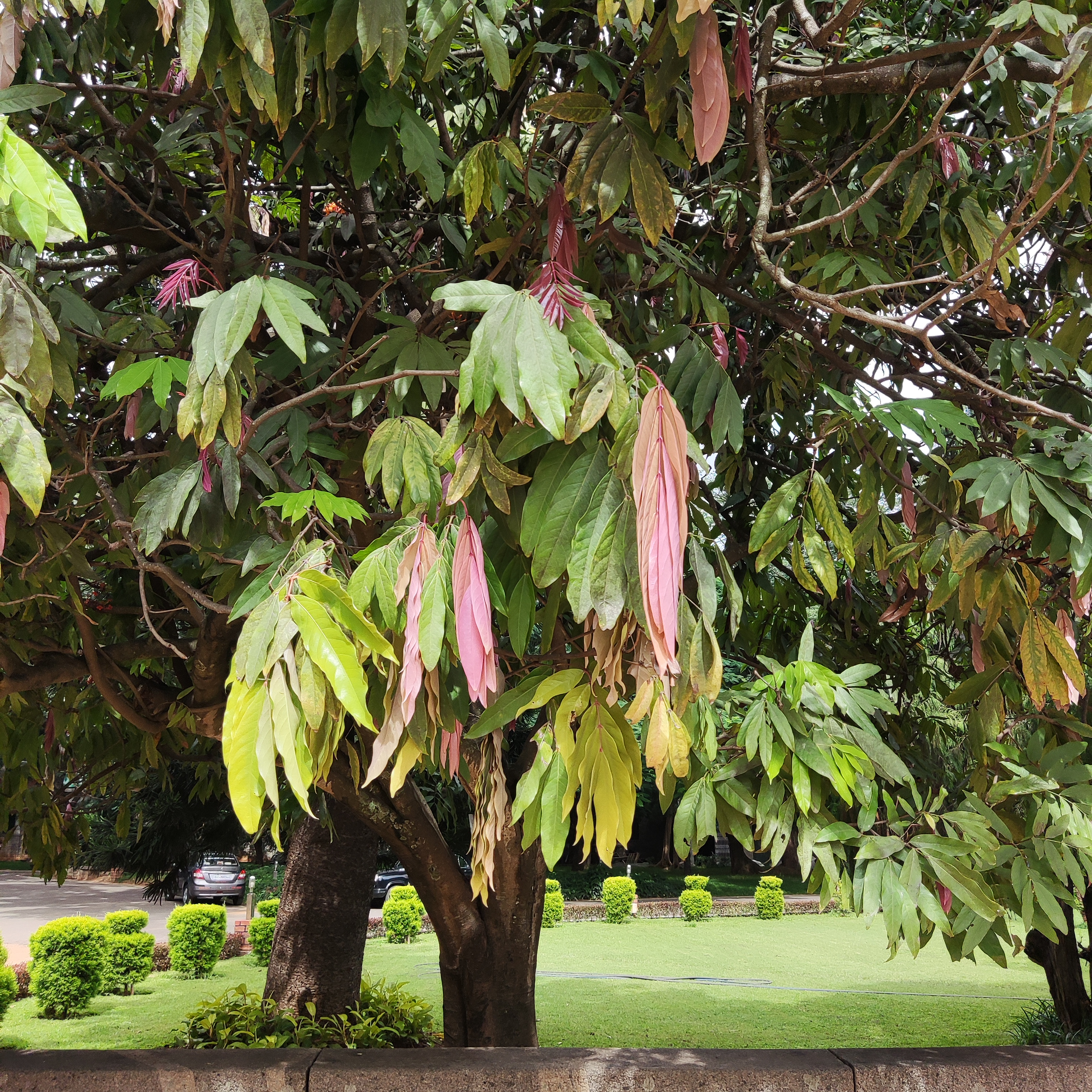
Young leaves showing pink-purple flush.

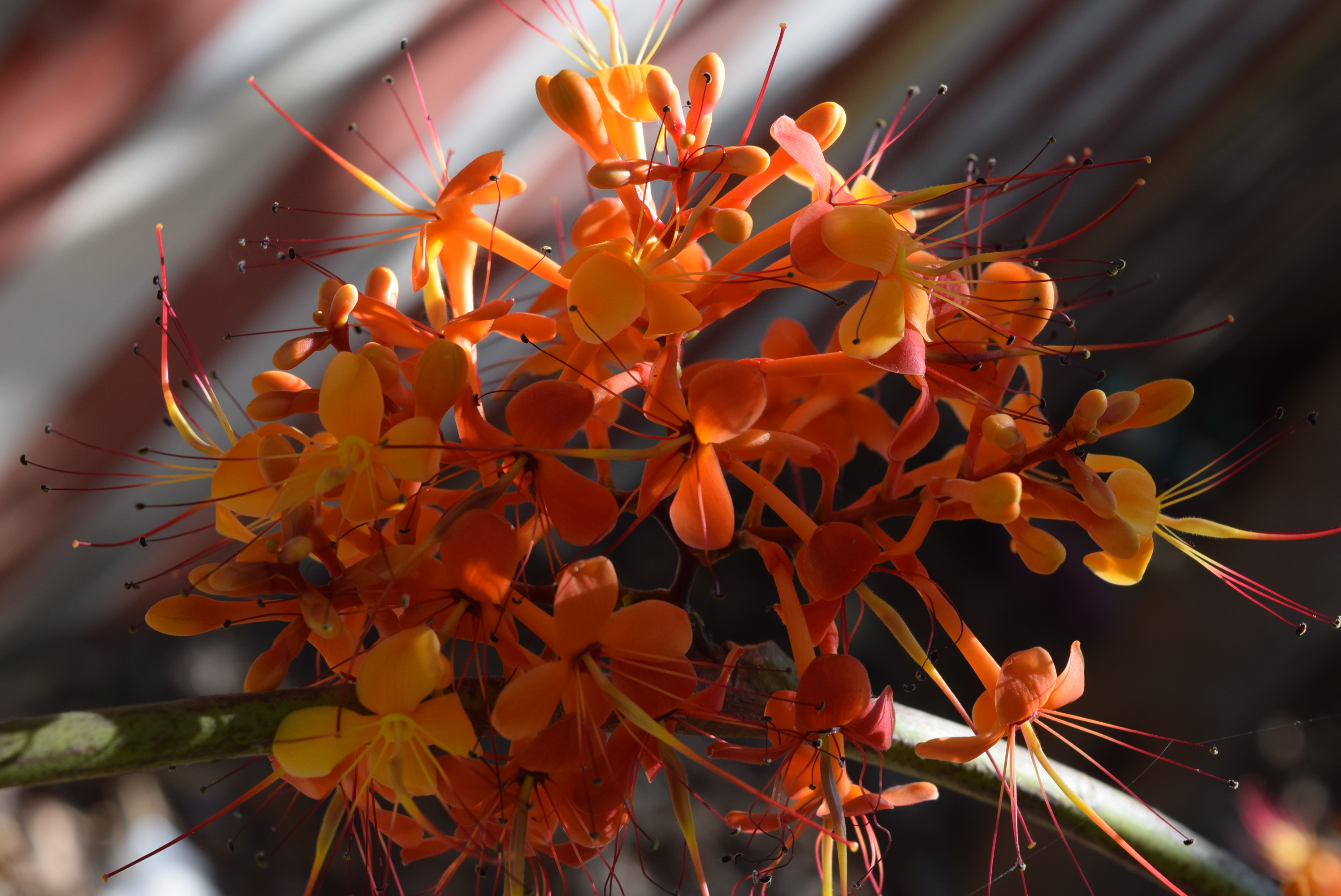
Close-up of saraca indica flowers.

S. indica is often confused with S. asoca, but can be distinguished by the width of their inflorescences, bract and bracteole traits, number of ovules, pod sizes, and geographic distribution. The inflorescence of S. indica has a lower range of width size, up to 10 cm (3.9 in), sometimes 22 cm (8.7 in), than that of S. asoca, which goes up to 15 cm (5.9 in), sometimes 30 cm (12 in). S. indica bracts are usually the same size as its bracteoles, whereas S. asoca bracts are usually smaller than its bracteoles; S. indica bracts also have a lower range of size, up to 0.8 cm (0.31 in) long by 0.45 cm (0.18 in), than those of S. asoca, which go up to 1.2 cm (0.47 in) long by 0.7 cm (0.28 in). S. indica bracteoles may be caducous or persistent during anthesis and do not clasp the pedicel, whereas S. asoca bracteoles are persistent during anthesis and are erect and clasp the pedicel. S. indica has 6–8 ovules whereas S. asoca has 8–10 and up to 12. Both pods are oblong, but S. indica pods may be narrowly oblong-lanceolate while S. asoca pods may be elongate-oblong or scimitar-shaped; both species' pods can grow up to a similar size but S. indica have smaller lower size range of 6 cm × 2 cm (2.36 in × 0.79 in), where S. asoca pods have a size range starting at 12.5 cm × 3.5 cm (4.9 in × 1.4 in), being generally longer than S. indica. The species also differ in native distribution: S. indica, despite its name, is native to most of Mainland Southeast Asia and Western Indonesia while S. asoca is native to the Indian Subcontinent and Myanmar west of the Irrawaddy River.

For its part, Saraca asoca is also often misidentified as S. indica, and in India as of 2014, pharmacological researchers, ayurvedic physicians, herbal industries, and several publications continued to erroneously refer to S. asoca as S. indica. Saraca is sometimes confused with the false ashoka, Monoon longifolium, which is a lofty evergreen tree native to India. It exhibits symmetrical pyramidal growth with willowy weeping pendulous branches and long narrow lanceolate leaves with undulate margins. The false ashoka tree is known to grow over 30 ft in height.

Species of Saraca are sometimes confused with the false ashoka, Monoon longifolium, which is a lofty evergreen tree native to India. It exhibits symmetrical pyramidal growth with willowy weeping pendulous branches and long narrow lanceolate leaves with undulate margins. The false ashoka tree is known to grow over 30 ft in height.

== Taxonomy ==
Saraca indica was formally described by botanist Carl Linnaeus in Mantissa Plantarum I in 1767; the type specimen was collected by Christiaan Kleynhoff from Java. Saraca arborescens was identified by Nicolaas Laurens Burman and his description was published in Flora Indica in 1768. It was later determined that S. arborescens is a synonym of S. indica and that its type species was "certainly a duplicate of Linnaeus'" type for S. indica.

Friedrich Anton Wilhelm Miquel published his description in 1855. He also described S. Zollingeriana, which was later reclassified as a variety of S. indica.John Gilbert Baker described it in The Flora of British India, published in 1879. Sijfert Hendrik Koorders and Theodoric Valenton published a description in 1895.

S. indica was described by George King in Materials for a Flora of the Malayan Peninsula, published in the 1897 Journal of the Asiatic Society of Bengal. The Journal also included a description by David Prain of S. bijuga, which was later reclassified as a variety of S. indica, and his identifications of S. kunstleri and S. minor var. bijuga were reclassified as a synonym of S. indica. Of S. indica, Prain wrote that after studying the material in the Calcutta Herbarium, he could find no evidence that it extended as a wild species east of the Irrawaddy. He found no specimens there from the Malay Peninsula and determined that those seen by J. G. Baker must have been from planted trees. François Gagnepain's description of S. indica was published in 1913, and he classified S. zollingeriana and S. bijuga as varieties of S. indica.

=== Synonyms ===
- Jonesia minor Zoll. & Moritzi
- Jonesia pinnata Willd.
- Saraca arborescens Burm.f.
- Saraca bijuga Prain
- Saraca harmandiana Pierre
- Saraca indica var. bijuga (Prain) Gagnep.
- Saraca indica var. zollingeriana (Miq.) Gagnep.
- Saraca kunstleri Prain
- Saraca lobbiana Baker
- Saraca minor (Zoll. & Moritzi) Miq.
- Saraca minor var. bijuga Prain
- Saraca pierreana Craib
- Saraca zollingeriana sensu Prain, non Miq.

=== Etymology ===
The genus name Saraca has an uncertain origin, sometimes attributed to the Sanskrit name Asoka, but is likely derived from the word sara, meaning "colored" or "spotted." The specific name, indica, is derived from Latin meaning "of India," where the species was thought to have originated.

== Ecology ==
The tree is evergreen and may flower multiple times a year but is said to flower in February and fruit in May. It is biotically pollinated and attracts bees. S. indica grows best along streams in forests; it prefers full sun, moderate water and fertile, loamy, well-drained soils. The seeds are eaten by monkeys and squirrels.

== Uses ==
S. indica is cultivated as an ornamental tree for its fragrant and showy flowers. It is considered suitable for roadsides as well as parks and gardens. The wood is sometimes used to make small utensils, pallets, veneer and plywood. In Southeast Asia, particularly Thailand, people eat the flowers and leaves of one variety of the species. The flowers are said to taste sourish.

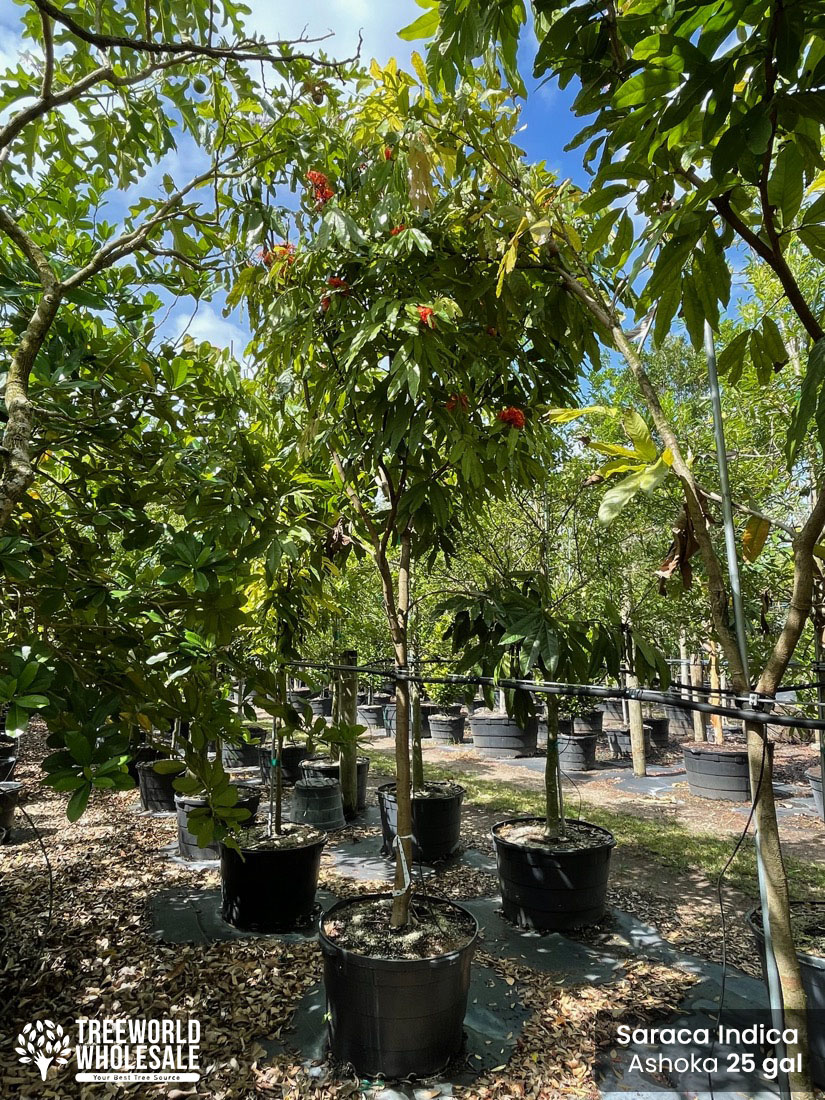
In a wholesale plant nursery.

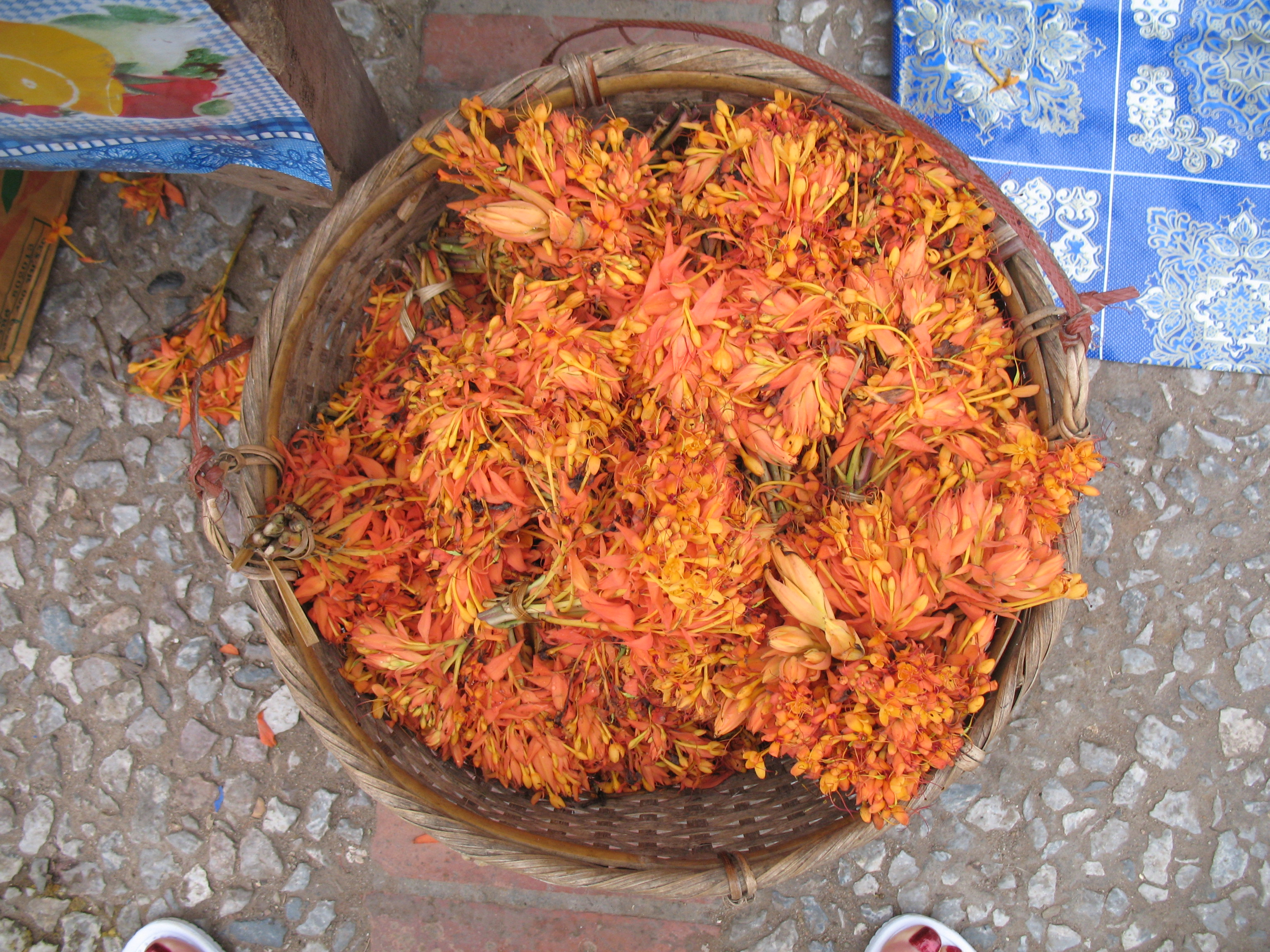
Flowers for use in cooking sold in a market in Laos.
