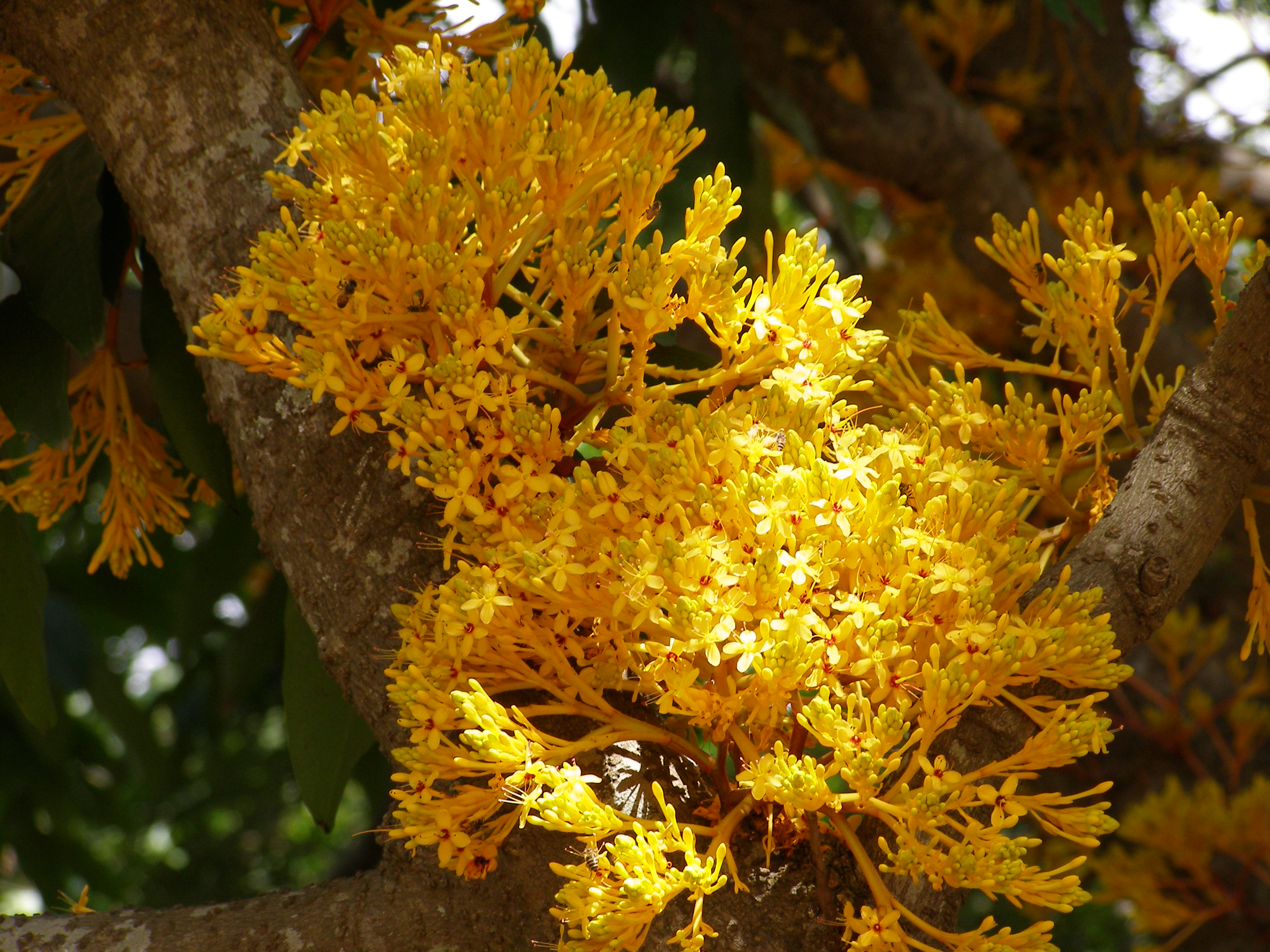
- Flowers

Scientific classification
- Kingdom: Plantae
- Clade: Tracheophytes
- Clade: Angiosperms
- Clade: Eudicots
- Clade: Rosids
- Order: Fabales
- Family: Fabaceae
- Genus: Saraca
- Species: S. thaipingensis

Binomial name
- Saraca thaipingensis Cantley

= Saraca thaipingensis =

Species of legume

Saraca thaipingensis is a tree species native to southeast Asia in the family Fabaceae. It has yellow flowers, borne on old wood, and is grown as an ornamental for floral effect. Common names include yellow ashoka and yellow saraca.

== Taxonomy ==
Saraca thaipingensis was first described by Nathaniel Cantley in 1897.
