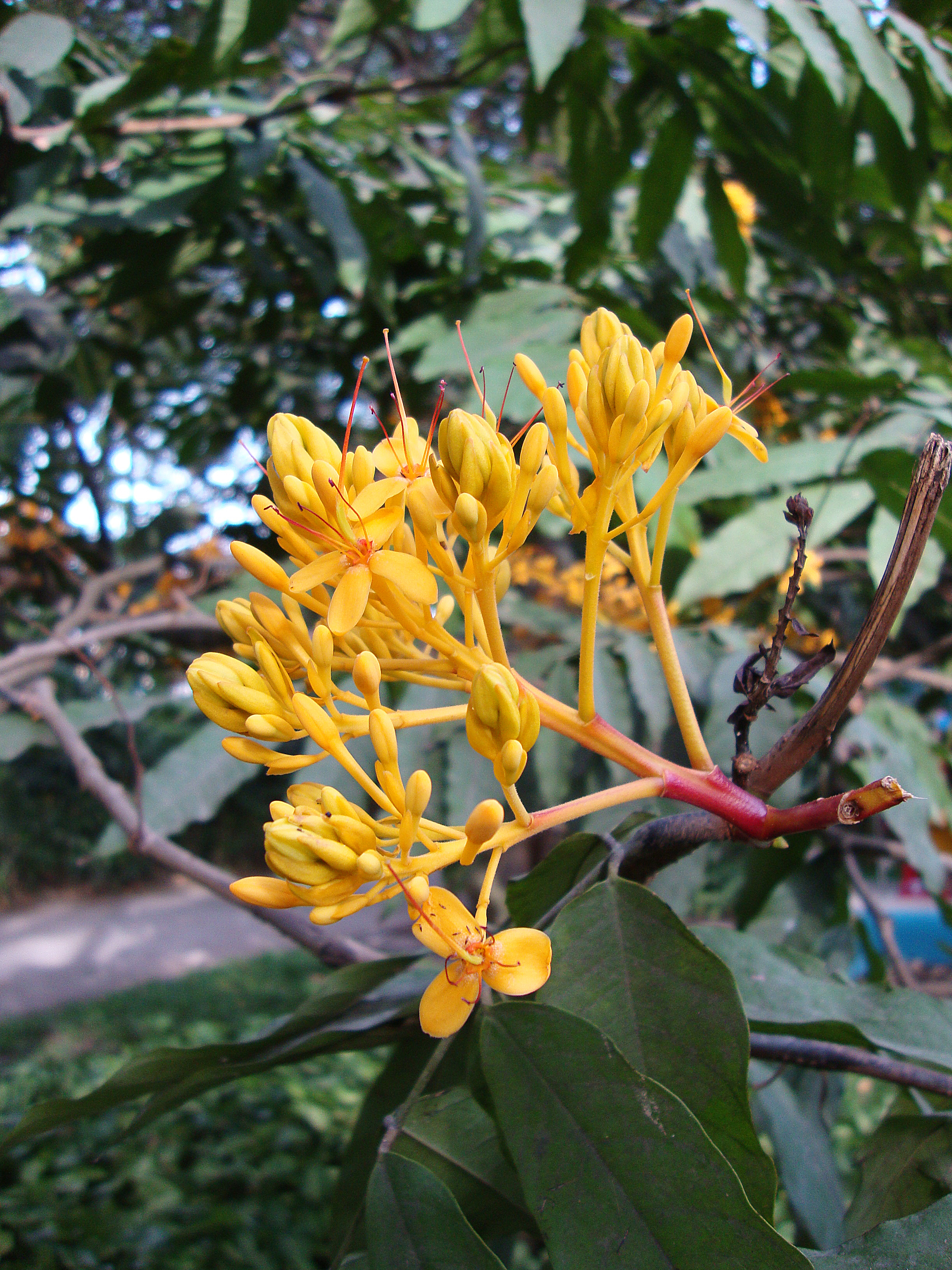

Scientific classification
- Kingdom: Plantae
- Clade: Tracheophytes
- Clade: Angiosperms
- Clade: Eudicots
- Clade: Rosids
- Order: Fabales
- Family: Fabaceae
- Genus: Saraca
- Species: S. dives

Binomial name
- Saraca dives Pierre

Synonyms
- Saraca chinensis Merr. & Chun; Saraca indica misapplied

= Saraca dives =

Species of legume

Saraca dives, is a tree species in genus Saraca belonging to the family Fabaceae, native to China, Laos, and Vietnam.
