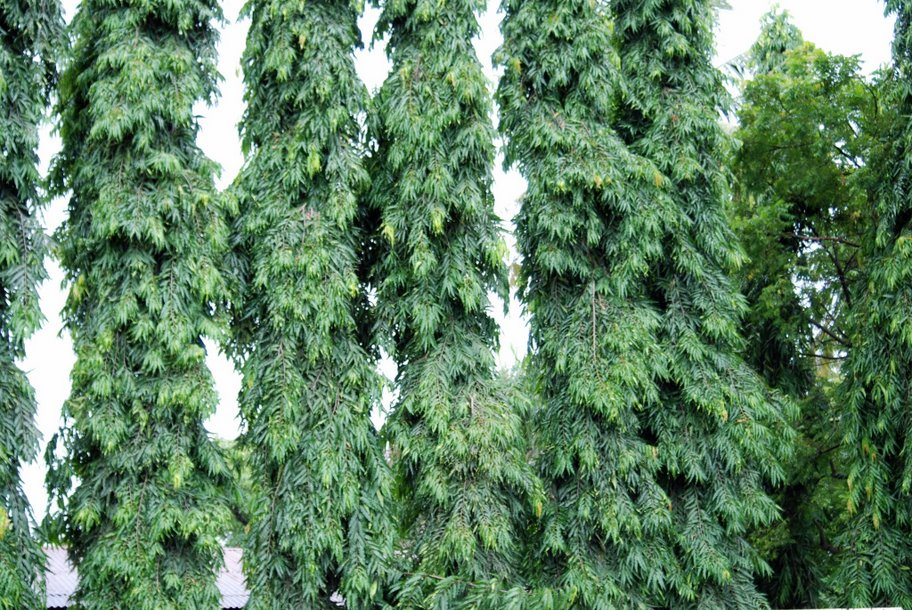

Conservation status
- Least Concern (IUCN 3.1)

Scientific classification
- Kingdom: Plantae
- Clade: Embryophytes
- Clade: Tracheophytes
- Clade: Spermatophytes
- Clade: Angiosperms
- Clade: Magnoliids
- Order: Magnoliales
- Family: Annonaceae
- Subfamily: Malmeoideae
- Tribe: Miliuseae
- Genus: Monoon
- Species: M. longifolium

Binomial name
- Monoon longifolium Sonn. B.Xue & R.M.K.Saunders

Synonyms
- Polyalthia longifolia (Sonn.) Thwaites; Polyalthia longifolia var. pendula Benthall; Guatteria longifolia (Sonn.) Wall.; Unona longifolia (Sonn.) Dunal; Uvaria altissima Pennant nom. illeg.; Uvaria longifolia Sonn.

= Monoon longifolium =

Species of flowering plant

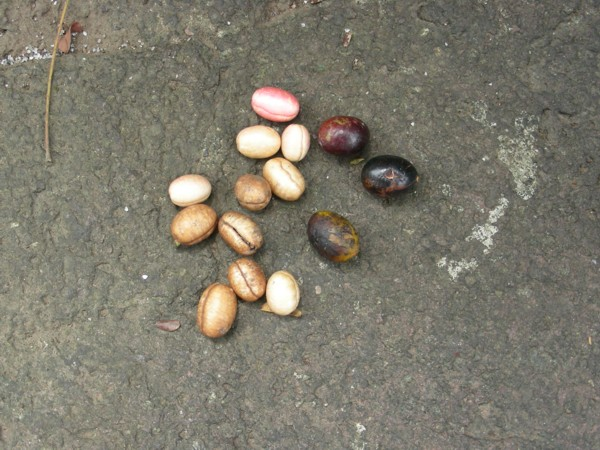
Seeds and fruit of M. longifolium

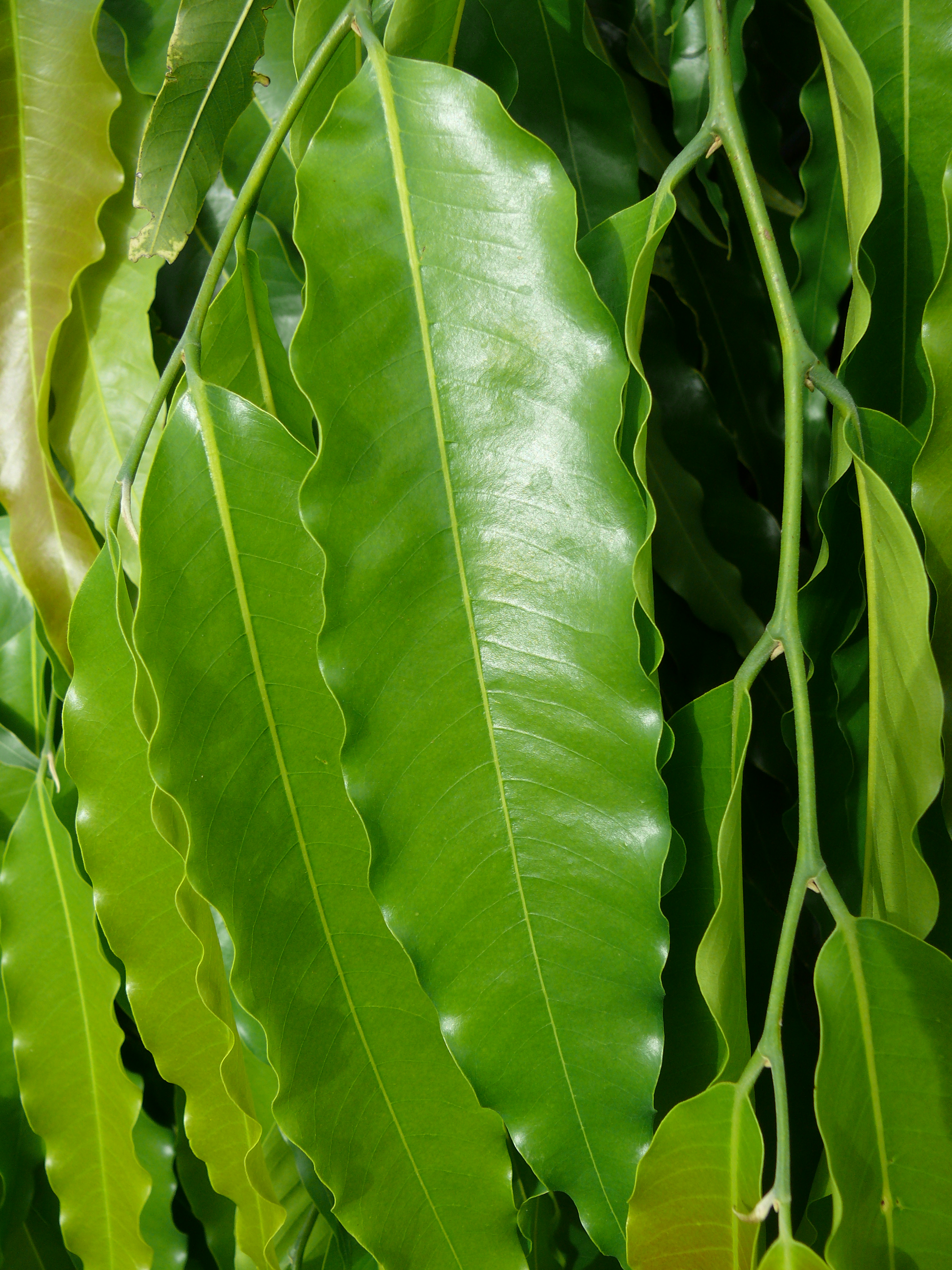
M. longifolium var. pendula – leaves

Monoon longifolium, the false ashoka, also commonly known by its synonym Polyalthia longifolia, is an Asian small tree species in the family Annonaceae. It is native to southern India and Sri Lanka, but has been widely introduced elsewhere in tropical Asia. This evergreen tree is known to grow over 20 m. in height and is commonly planted due to its effectiveness in alleviating noise pollution. It exhibits symmetrical pyramidal growth with willowy weeping pendulous branches and long narrow lanceolate leaves with undulate margins.

Monoon longifolium is sometimes incorrectly identified as the ashoka tree (Saraca indica) because of the close resemblance of both trees. The cultivated, column-like pendula form can appear to have no branches, but in fact a non-hybrid M. longifolium allowed to grow naturally (without trimming the branches out for decorative reasons) grows into a normal large tree giving plenty of shade.

== Common names ==
Common names include false ashoka, the Buddha tree, Indian mast tree, and Indian fir tree. Its names in other languages include Ashoka in Sanskrit, Unboi (উনবৈ) or Debadaru (দেৱদাৰু) in Assamese, Debdaru in Bengali and Hindi ଦେବଦାରୁ Debadaru in odia Asopalav (આસોપાલવ) (Gujarati), Glodogan tiang (Indonesian), Ashok in Marathi and Nettilinkam நெட்டிலிங்கம் in Tamil, and araNamaram: അരണമരം (Malayalam). ಕಂಬದ ಮರ Kambada mara in Kannada

=== In British India ===
The False ashoka was cultivated and gained popularity in British India for nostalgic reasons because it resembled the tall, harrow Italian cypress; it also was used for ships' masts. It does not require pruning in order to maintain its tall, straight, main trunk with short, drooping branches.

== Distribution ==
Found natively in southern India and Sri Lanka. It is introduced in gardens in many tropical countries around the world. It is, for example, widely used in parts of Jakarta in Indonesia and the Caribbean islands of Trinidad and Tobago.

== Leaves ==
Emerging leaves have a coppery brown pigmentation; as the leaves grow older, the color becomes a light green and, finally, a dark green. The leaves are lanceolate and have wavy edges. The leaves are larval food plant of the tailed jay and the kite swallowtail butterflies.

== Flowering ==
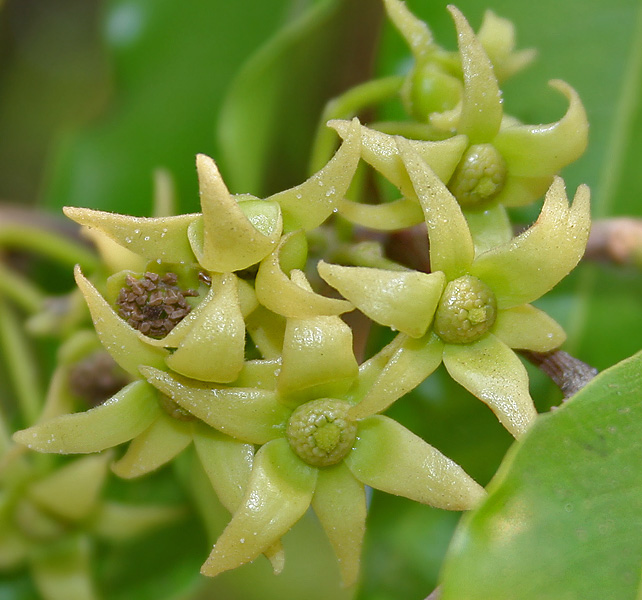
Close up flowers in Hyderabad, India.

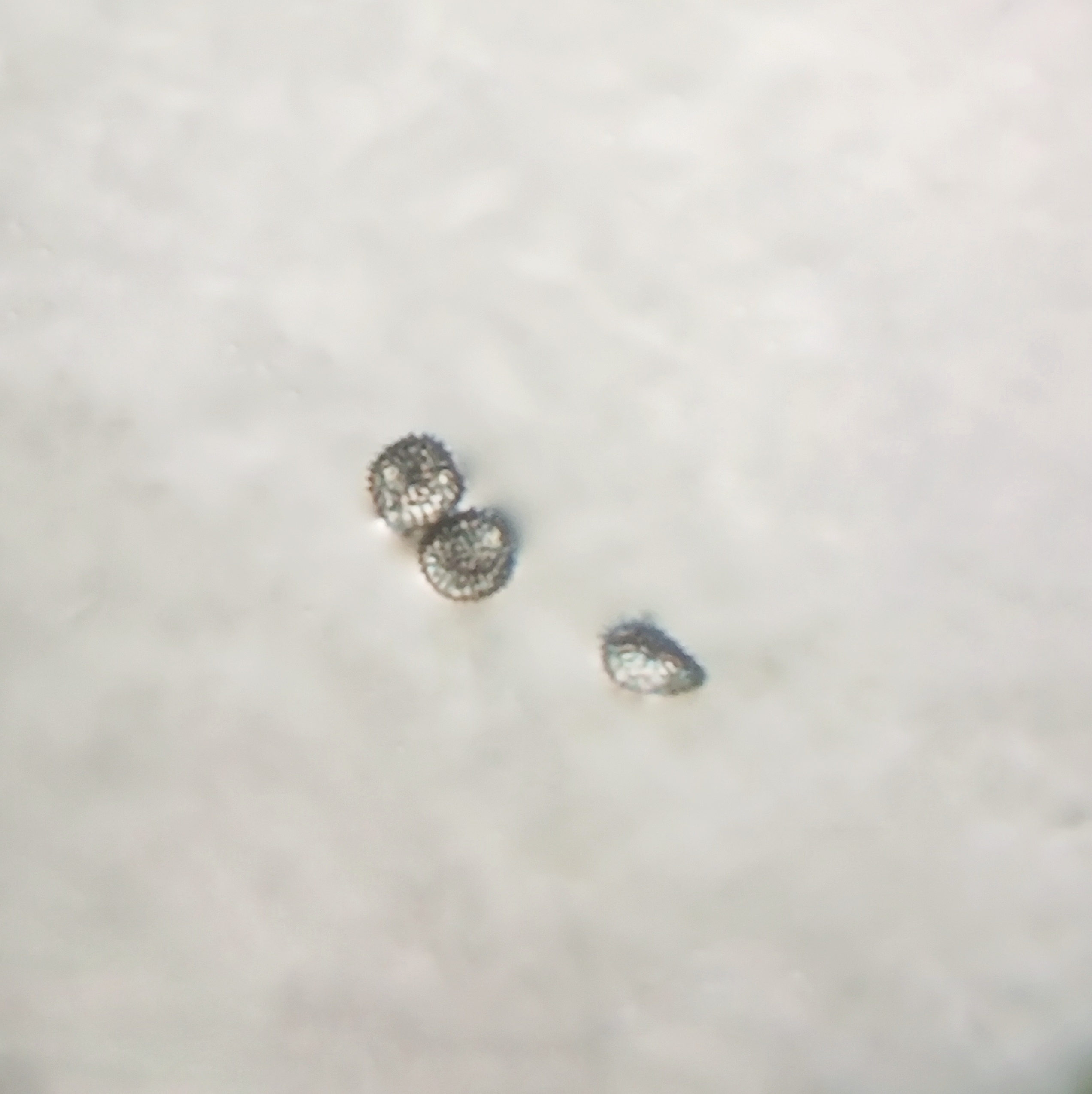
Pollen grains of Monoon longifolium

In spring, the tree is covered with delicate star-like pale green flowers. The flowering period lasts for a short period, usually two to three weeks.

Fruit is borne in clusters of 10–20, initially green but turning purple or black when ripe. These are eaten by birds such as the Asian koel, Eudynamys scolopaceus, and fruit bats, including flying foxes.

== Uses ==
The leaves are used for ornamental decoration during festivals. The tree is a focal point in gardens throughout India. The tree can be pruned into various shapes and maintained in required sizes. The flexible, straight and light-weight trunks were once used in the making of masts for sailing ships. Thus, the tree is also known as the Mast Tree. Today, its wood is mostly used for manufacturing small articles such as pencils, boxes, matchsticks, etc. The oil of the seed has been confirmed to possess anti-oxidant, anti-lipooxygenase and antimicrobial (against various microbe strains) activities, among others. Bankole et al 2016 find M. longifolium does control chloroquine resistant strains of Plasmodium berghei ANKA in mouse to some degree but is not an effective treatment.

Methanolic extracts of Monoon longifolium have yielded 20 known and two new organic compounds, some of which show cytotoxic properties. The fatty acid composition of the seed has also been reported
