= Interchalcogen =

The chalcogens react with each other to form interchalcogen compounds.

Although no chalcogen is extremely electropositive, (Note: This article uses Pauling electronegativity throughout.) nor quite as electronegative as the halogen fluorine (the most electronegative element), there is a large difference in electronegativity between the top (oxygen = 3.44 — the second most electronegative element after fluorine) and bottom (polonium = 2.0) of the group. Combined with the fact that there is a significant trend towards increasing metallic behaviour while descending the group (oxygen is a gaseous nonmetal, while polonium is a silvery post-transition metal (Note: The classification of polonium as a post-transition metal or a metalloid is disputed.)), this causes the interchalcogens to display many different kinds of bonding: covalent, ionic, metallic, and semimetallic. (Note: The heavier halogens are sufficiently electronegative to prevent ionic or metallic bonding in the interhalogens, and the lighter pnictogens are not sufficiently electronegative to allow ionic or metallic bonding in the interpnictogens.)

== Known binary interchalcogens ==
	O				
O	O_{2}, O_{3}, O_{4}, O_{8}	S			
S	S_{2}O, SO, S_{2}O_{2}, SO_{2}, SO_{3}	S_{2}, S_{3}, S_{6}, S_{7}, S_{8}, S_{∞}	Se		
Se	SeO_{2}, SeO_{3}	Se_{x}S_{y}	Se_{6}, Se_{7}, Se_{8}, Se_{∞}	Te	
Te	TeO, TeO_{2}, TeO_{3}, Te_{2}O_{5}	Te_{x}S_{y} (many unknown)	Te_{x}Se_{y} (many unknown)	Te_{∞}	Po
Po	PoO, PoO_{2}, PoO_{3}	PoS (many unknown)	Po_{x}Se_{y} (many unknown)	Po_{x}Te_{y} (unknown)	Po_{∞}

== Bonding in the binary interchalcogens ==
Going down the above table, there is a transition from covalent bonding (with discrete molecules) to ionic bonding; going across the table, there is a transition from ionic bonding to metallic bonding. (Covalent bonding occurs when both elements have similar high electronegativities; ionic bonding occurs when the two elements have very different electronegativities, one low and the other high; metallic bonding occurs when both elements have similar low electronegativities.) For example, in the leftmost column of the table (with bonds to oxygen), O_{2} and O_{3} are purely covalent, SO_{2} and SO_{3} are polar molecules, SeO_{2} forms chained polymers (stretching in one dimension), TeO_{2} forms layered polymers (stretching in two dimensions), and PoO_{2} is ionic with the fluorite structure (spatial polymers, stretching in three dimensions); in the bottom row of the table (with bonds to polonium), PoO_{2} and PoS are ionic, Po_{x}Se_{y} and Po_{x}Te_{y} are semimetallic, and Po_{∞} is metallic.

== Summary of known binary interchalcogens ==
=== Sulfur chalcogenides ===
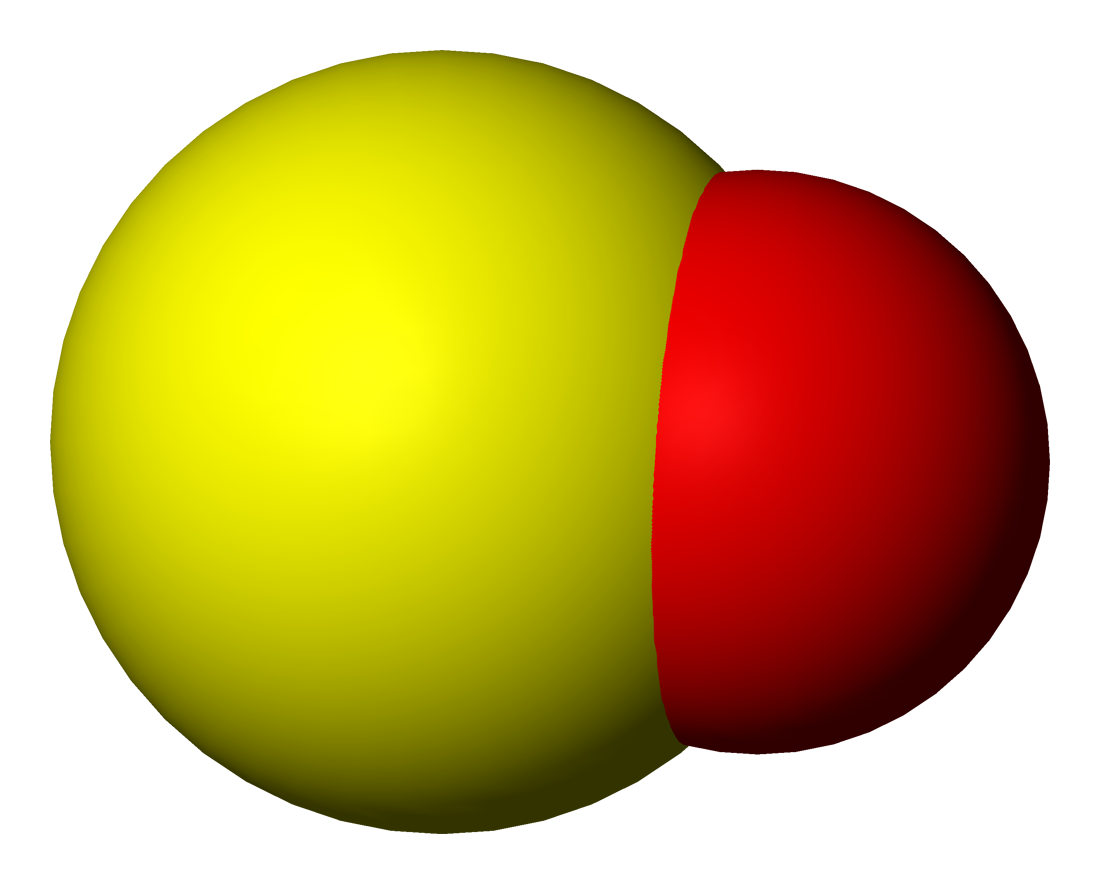
Molecular structure of sulfur monoxide.

- Lower sulfur oxides, S_{x}O_{y} where the ratio x:y is greater than 1:2
  - Disulfur monoxide, S_{2}O
  - Disulfur dioxide, S_{2}O_{2}
  - Sulfur monoxide, SO
- Sulfur dioxide, SO_{2}
- Sulfur trioxide, SO_{3}
- Higher sulfur oxides, SO_{x} where x > 3

=== Selenium chalcogenides ===
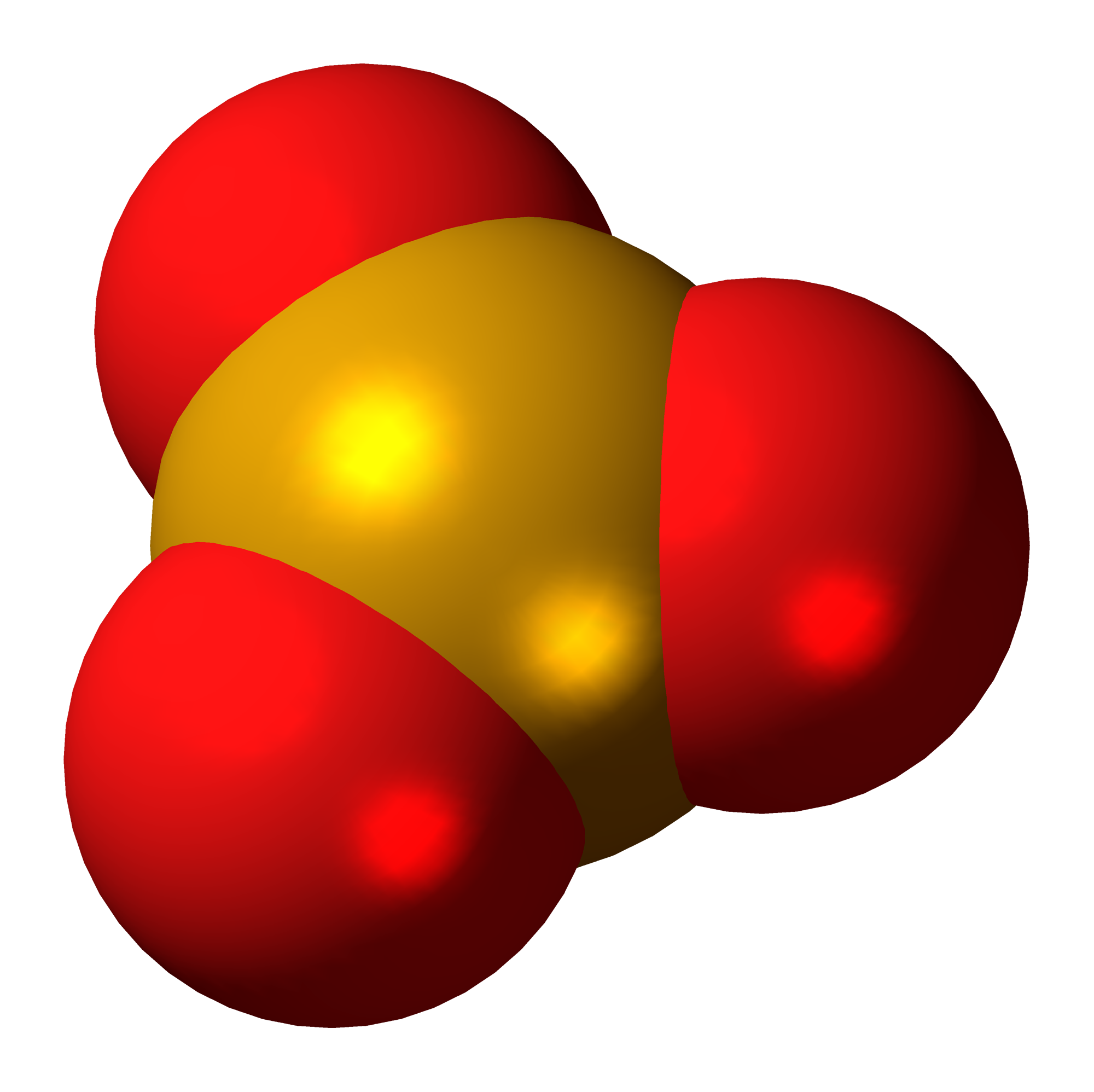
Molecular structure of selenium trioxide.

- Selenium dioxide, SeO_{2}
- Selenium trioxide, SeO_{3}
- Many "alloys" of selenium and sulfur in different concentrations with semimetallic bonding, Se_{x}S_{y}
  - "Selenium monosulfide", SeS
  - "Selenium disulfide", SeS_{2}, actually a 2:1 mixture of cyclo-Se_{3}S_{5} and cyclo-Se_{2}S_{6}
  - "Selenium trisulfide", SeS_{3}, actually occurring as an 8-membered cyclic compound Se_{2}S_{6} (diselenacyclooctasulfane), where two sulfur atoms in the molecule of cyclooctasulfur are replaced by selenium atoms

=== Tellurium chalcogenides ===
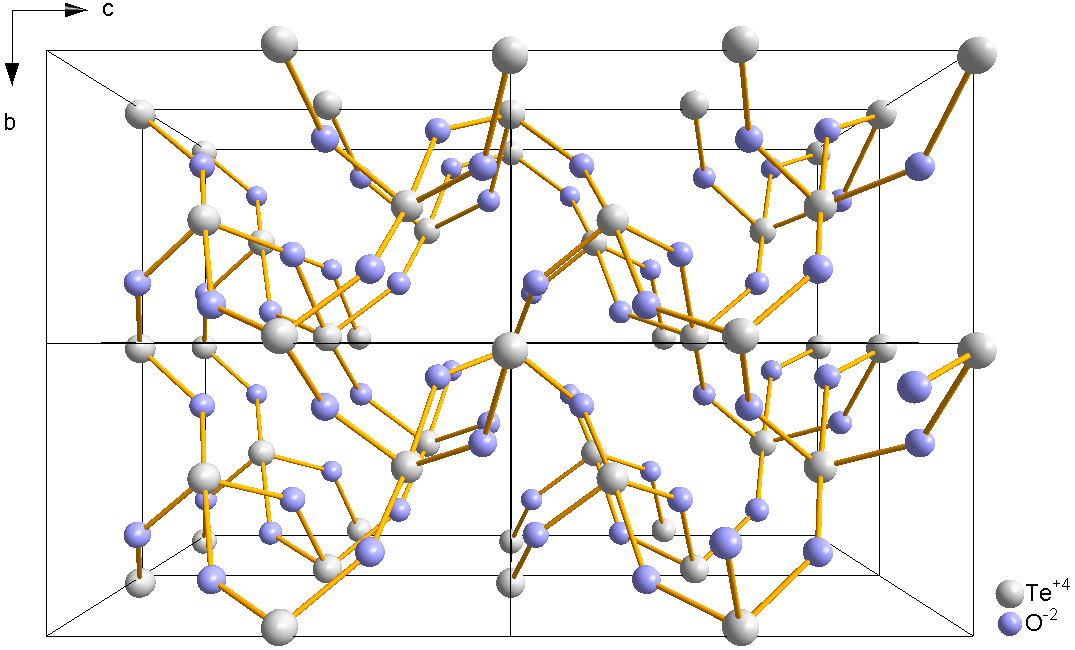
Crystal structure of tellurium dioxide.

- Tellurium monoxide, TeO (unstable transient species)
- Tellurium dioxide, TeO_{2}
- Tellurium trioxide, TeO_{3}
- Ditellurium pentoxide, Te_{2}O_{5}
- Many "alloys" of tellurium and sulfur in different concentrations with semimetallic bonding, Te_{x}S_{y}
- Many "alloys" of tellurium and selenium in different concentrations with semimetallic bonding, Te_{x}Se_{y}

=== Polonium chalcogenides ===
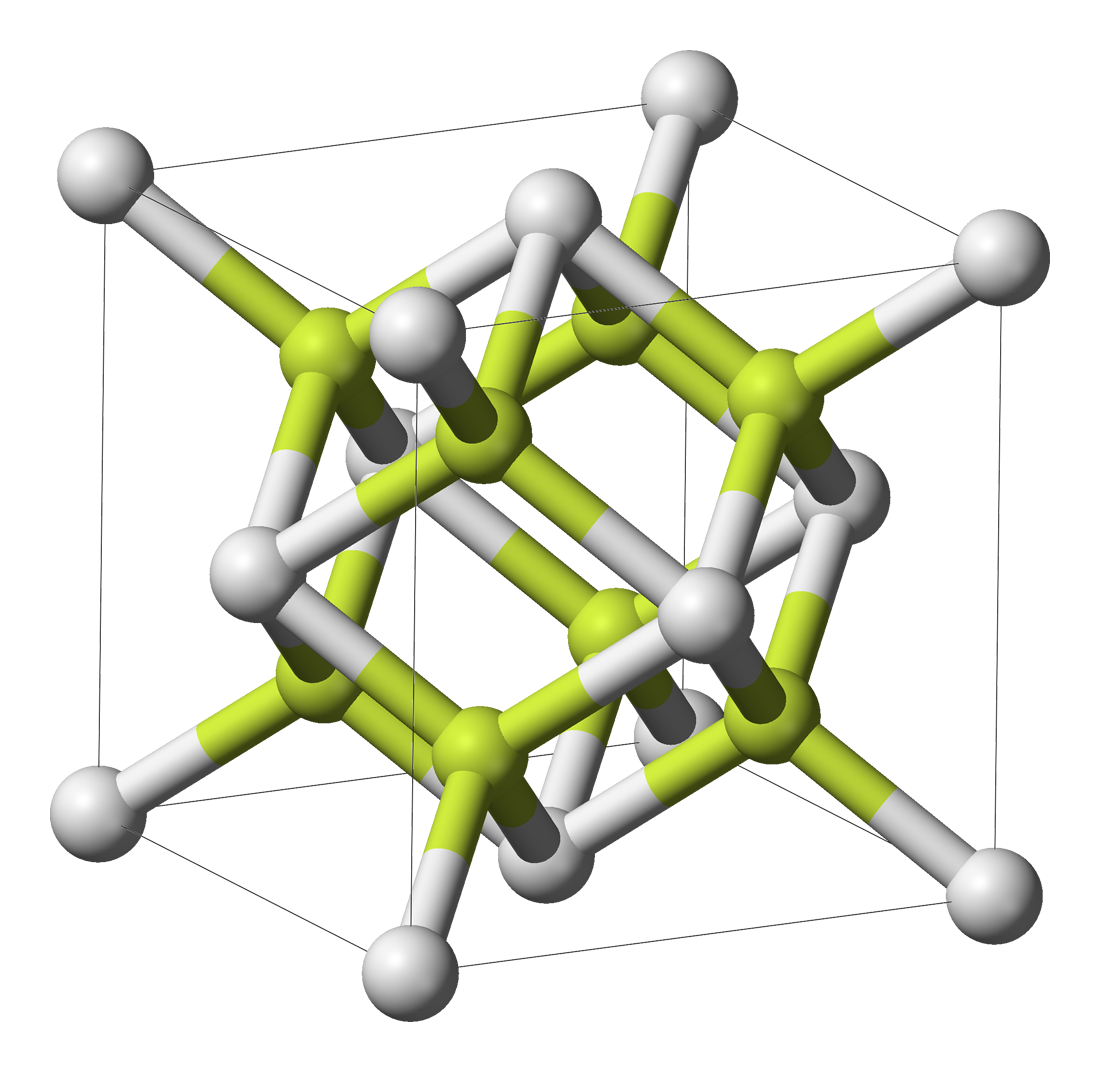
Unit cell of polonium dioxide (cubic modification). Po: white; O: yellow.

- Polonium monoxide, PoO
- Polonium dioxide, PoO_{2}
- Polonium trioxide, PoO_{3}
- Polonium monosulfide, PoS
- Many "alloys" of polonium and selenium in different concentrations with semimetallic bonding, Po_{x}Se_{y}
- Many "alloys" of polonium and tellurium in different concentrations with semimetallic bonding, Po_{x}Te_{y}

== See also ==
- Interhalogen
- Hydrogen chalcogenide
