= Polonium dioxide =

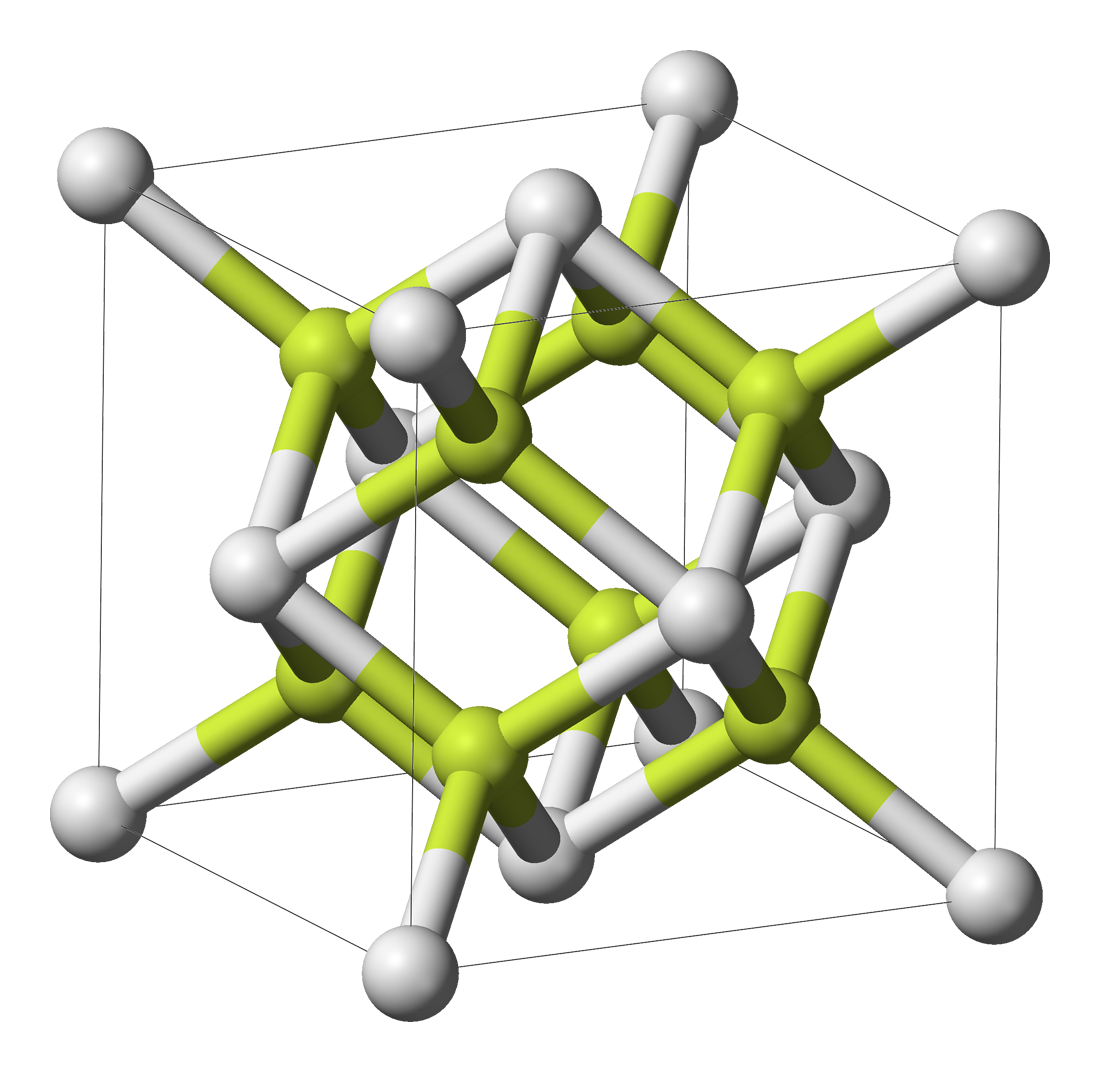
- Unit cell of cubic polonium dioxide (white = Po, yellow = O)

Names
- Systematic IUPAC name Polonium dioxide

Identifiers
CAS Number	7446-06-2
3D model (JSmol)	Interactive image
ChemSpider	52083691
UNII	JC742031MY
- InChI: InChI=1S/2O.Po Key: VEGDJCLVAHXQEM-UHFFFAOYSA-N
- SMILES: O=[Po]=O

Properties
Chemical formula	PoO_{2}
Molar mass	240.98 g/mol
Appearance	pale yellow crystalline solid
Density	8.9 g/cm^{3}
Melting point	500 °C (932 °F; 773 K) (decomposes) sublimes at 885 °C (under oxygen)

Structure
Crystal structure	fluorite, Pearson symbol cF12
Space group	Fm3̅m (No 225)
Lattice constant	a = 0.5637 nm
- Except where otherwise noted, data are given for materials in their standard state (at 25 °C [77 °F], 100 kPa). Infobox references

Polonium dioxide (also known as polonium(IV) oxide) is a chemical compound with the formula PoO_{2}. It is one of three oxides of polonium, the other two being polonium monoxide (PoO) and polonium trioxide (PoO_{3}). It is a pale yellow crystalline solid at room temperature. Under lowered pressure (such as a vacuum), it decomposes into elemental polonium and oxygen at 500 °C. It is the most stable oxide of polonium and is an interchalcogen.

== Structure and appearance ==
At room temperature, polonium dioxide has a face-centered cubic (fluorite) crystal structure; upon heating to high temperatures, it crystallises in the tetragonal crystal system. The cubic form is pale yellow, while the tetragonal form is red. Polonium dioxide darkens upon heating, and is chocolate brown at its sublimation point, 885 °C. The ionic radius of the Po^{4+} ion is 1.02 or 1.04 Å; thus, the ratio of the ionic radii Po^{4+}/O^{2−} is about 0.73, the lower limit of stability for the cubic crystal system, allowing polonium dioxide to have two modifications. When freshly prepared, polonium dioxide is always in the tetragonal form, and changes to the cubic form after being left to stand or after being cooled strongly.

== Occurrence ==
Polonium dioxide does not occur naturally due to the scarcity of polonium in nature and the high temperatures (250 °C) required to form the dioxide.

== Preparation ==
Polonium dioxide is prepared by reacting elemental polonium with oxygen at 250 °C or by thermal decomposition of polonium(IV) hydroxide (PoO(OH)_{2}), or various polonium salts such as polonium disulfate (Po(SO_{4})_{2}), polonium selenate (Po(SeO_{4})_{2}), or polonium tetranitrate (Po(NO_{3})_{4}).

== Chemistry ==
When placed in hydrogen, polonium dioxide is slowly reduced to metallic polonium at 200 °C; the same reduction occurs at 250 °C in ammonia or hydrogen sulfide. When heated in sulfur dioxide at 250 °C, a white compound is formed, possibly a polonium sulfite. When polonium dioxide is hydrated, polonous acid (H_{2}PoO_{3}), a pale yellow, voluminous precipitate, is formed. Despite its name, polonous acid is an amphoteric compound, reacting with both acids and bases.

Halogenation of polonium dioxide with the hydrogen halides yields the polonium tetrahalides:

PoO_{2} + 4 HF → PoF_{4} + 2 H_{2}O
PoO_{2} + 4 HCl → PoCl_{4} + 2 H_{2}O
PoO_{2} + 4 HBr → PoBr_{4} + 2 H_{2}O
PoO_{2} + 4 HI → PoI_{4} + 2 H_{2}O

In reactions, polonium dioxide behaves very much like its homologue tellurium dioxide, forming Po(IV) salts; however, the acidic character of the chalcogen oxides decreases going down the group, and polonium dioxide and polonium(IV) hydroxide are much less acidic than their lighter homologues. For example, SO_{2}, SO_{3}, SeO_{2}, SeO_{3} and TeO_{3} are acidic, but TeO_{2} is amphoteric, and PoO_{2}, while amphoteric, even shows some basic character.

The reaction of polonium dioxide with potassium hydroxide or potassium nitrate in air gives the colourless potassium polonite (K_{2}PoO_{3}):

PoO_{2} + 2 KOH → K_{2}PoO_{3} + H_{2}O
PoO_{2} + 2 KNO_{3} → K_{2}PoO_{3} + 2 NO

Polonium dioxide is closely related to the polonite anion (PoO^{2−}_{3}), similar to the relationship between polonium trioxide and the polonate anion (PoO^{2−}_{4}).

== Applications ==
Polonium dioxide has no uses outside of basic research.

== Precautions ==
Polonium, whether in elemental form or as any polonium compound, such as polonium dioxide, is extremely radioactive. Thus PoO_{2} must be handled in a glove box. The glove box must further be enclosed in another box similar to the glove box, maintained at a slightly higher pressure than the first glove box to prevent the radioactive materials from leaking out. Gloves made of natural rubber do not provide sufficient protection against the radiation from polonium; surgical gloves are necessary. Neoprene gloves shield radiation from polonium better than natural rubber.
