= Polonium hydride =

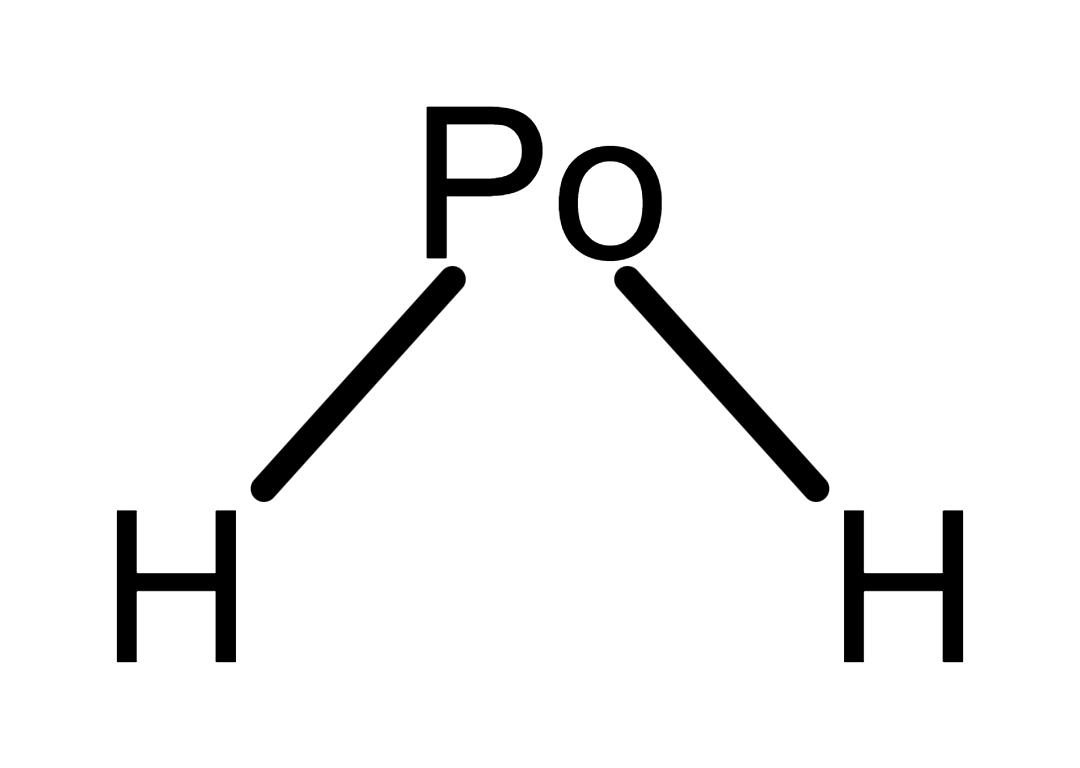
- Structural formula of hydrogen polonide

- Space-filling model of the hydrogen polonide molecule Polonium, Po Hydrogen, H

Names
- Preferred IUPAC name Polonium hydride
- Systematic IUPAC name Polane
- Other names: Hydrogen polonide; Polonium dihydride; Dihydridopolonium

Identifiers
CAS Number	31060-73-8
3D model (JSmol)	Interactive image
ChEBI	CHEBI:30444
ChemSpider	22383
Gmelin Reference	25163, 169602
PubChem CID	23941
CompTox Dashboard (EPA)	DTXSID401313749
- InChI: InChI=1S/Po.2H Key: OFSDTGZOZPQDCK-UHFFFAOYSA-N
- SMILES: [PoH2]

Properties
Chemical formula	H_{2}Po
Molar mass	211 g·mol^{−1}
Melting point	−35.3 °C (−31.5 °F; 237.8 K)
Boiling point	36.1 °C (97.0 °F; 309.2 K)
Conjugate base	Polonide

Structure
Molecular shape	Bent

Related compounds
Other anions	H_{2}O; H_{2}S; H_{2}Se; H_{2}Te
Other cations	TlH_{3} PbH_{4} BiH_{3} HAt
- Except where otherwise noted, data are given for materials in their standard state (at 25 °C [77 °F], 100 kPa). Infobox references

Polonium hydride (also known as polonium dihydride, hydrogen polonide, or polane) is a chemical compound with the formula PoH_{2}. It is a liquid at room temperature, the second hydrogen chalcogenide with this property after water. It is very unstable chemically and tends to decompose into elemental polonium and hydrogen. It is a volatile and very labile compound, from which many polonides can be derived. Additionally, it is radioactive.

== Preparation ==
Polonium hydride cannot be produced by direct reaction from the elements upon heating. Other unsuccessful routes to synthesis include the reaction of polonium tetrachloride (PoCl_{4}) with lithium aluminium hydride (LiAlH_{4}), which only produces elemental polonium, and the reaction of hydrochloric acid with magnesium polonide (MgPo). The fact that these synthesis routes do not work may be caused by the radiolysis of polonium hydride upon formation.

Trace quantities of polonium hydride may be prepared by reacting hydrochloric acid with polonium-plated magnesium foil. In addition, the diffusion of trace quantities of polonium in palladium or platinum that is saturated with hydrogen (see palladium hydride) may be due to the formation and migration of polonium hydride.

== Properties ==
Polonium hydride is a more covalent compound than most metal hydrides because polonium straddles the border between metals and metalloids and has some nonmetallic properties. It is intermediate between a hydrogen halide like hydrogen chloride and a metal hydride like stannane.

It should have properties similar to that of hydrogen selenide and hydrogen telluride, other borderline hydrides. It is expected to be an endothermic compound, like the lighter hydrogen telluride and hydrogen selenide, and therefore would decompose into its constituent elements, releasing heat in the process. The amount of heat given off in the decomposition of polonium hydride is over 100 kJ/mol, the largest of all the hydrogen chalcogenides.

It is predicted that, like the other hydrogen chalcogenides, polonium may form two types of salts: polonide (containing the Po^{2−} anion) and one from polonium hydride (containing –PoH, which would be the polonium analogue of thiol, selenol and tellurol). However, no salts from polonium hydride are known. An example of a polonide is lead polonide (PbPo), which occurs naturally as lead is formed in the alpha decay of polonium.

Polonium hydride is difficult to work with due to the extreme radioactivity of polonium and its compounds and has only been prepared in very dilute tracer quantities. As a result, its physical properties are not definitely known. It is also unknown if polonium hydride forms an acidic solution in water like its lighter homologues, or if it behaves more like a metal hydride (see also hydrogen astatide).
