= Tellurium oxide =

Tellurium oxide may refer to:

- Tellurium monoxide, TeO
- Tellurium dioxide, TeO_{2}
- Tellurium trioxide, TeO_{3}
