= Chromium selenide =

Chromium selenide may refer to:

- Chromium(II) selenide
- Chromium(III) selenide
