= Polonium bromide =

Polonium bromide may refer to:

- Polonium(II) bromide (polonium dibromide), PoBr_{2}
- Polonium(IV) bromide (polonium tetrabromide), PoBr_{4}
