= Tellurite glass =

Tellurite glasses contain tellurium dioxide (TeO_{2}) as the main component.
