= Ammonium tellurate =

Names
- IUPAC name Ammonium tellurate
- Other names Diammonium tellurate, ammonium tellurate(VI)

Identifiers
CAS Number	13453-06-0
3D model (JSmol)	Interactive image
ChemSpider	55516
ECHA InfoCard	100.033.279
EC Number	236-622-6
PubChem CID	61608
CompTox Dashboard (EPA)	DTXSID20928656
- InChI: InChI=1S/2H3N.H2O4Te/c;;1-5(2,3)4/h2*1H3;(H2,1,2,3,4) Key: DRGYXGZFRXFMHF-UHFFFAOYSA-N
- SMILES: [NH4+].[NH4+].[O-][Te](=O)(=O)[O-]

Properties
Chemical formula	H_{8}N_{2}O_{4}Te
Molar mass	227.67 g·mol^{−1}
Appearance	White powder
Density	3.024 g/cm^{3}
Solubility in water	soluble

Hazards
- GHS labelling
Pictograms	(GHS07: Exclamation mark)
Signal word	Warning
Precautionary statements	P264, P270, P301, P312, P330, P501
- Except where otherwise noted, data are given for materials in their standard state (at 25 °C [77 °F], 100 kPa). Infobox references

Ammonium tellurate is a chemical compound with the chemical formula (NH_{4})_{2}TeO_{4}.

== Synthesis ==
The compound can be obtained by oxidation of tellurium dioxide TeO_{2} with hydrogen peroxide in an ammonia medium.

== Physical properties ==
Ammonium tellurate forms white crystals, soluble in water.

== Chemical properties ==
When heated, the compound decomposes releasing toxic fumes of Te, NO_{x}, and NH_{3}.
