= Tellurium monoxide =

Names
- Other names Tellurium(II) oxide

Identifiers
CAS Number	13451-17-7
3D model (JSmol)	Interactive image
ChemSpider	109910
PubChem CID	123307
UNII	NV4RQ44VY4
CompTox Dashboard (EPA)	DTXSID50158762
- InChI: InChI=1S/OTe/c1-2 Key: QGMWCJPYHVWVRR-UHFFFAOYSA-N
- SMILES: [Te]=O

Properties
Chemical formula	TeO
Molar mass	143.60 g/mol

Related compounds
Other cations	Sulfur monoxide Polonium monoxide
Related tellurium oxides	Tellurium dioxide Tellurium trioxide
- Except where otherwise noted, data are given for materials in their standard state (at 25 °C [77 °F], 100 kPa). Infobox references

The diatomic molecule tellurium monoxide has been found as a transient species. Previous work that claimed the existence of TeO solid has not been substantiated. The coating on DVDs called tellurium suboxide may be a mixture of tellurium dioxide and tellurium metal.

== History ==
Tellurium monoxide was first reported in 1883 by E. Divers and M. Shimose. It was supposedly created by the thermal decomposition of tellurium sulfoxide in a vacuum, and was shown to react with hydrogen chloride in a 1913 report. Later work has not substantiated the claim that this was a pure solid compound. By 1984, the company Panasonic was working on an erasable optical disk drive containing "tellurium monoxide" (really a mixture of Te and TeO_{2}).

== See also ==
- Tellurium dioxide
- Tellurium trioxide
- Lead carbide – originally thought to be a pure compound, but now considered more likely to be a mixture of carbon and lead
- Iodine pentabromide – originally thought to be a pure compound, but now considered to probably be a mixture of iodine monobromide and excess unreacted bromine
