= Polonide =

Chemical compound containing polonium

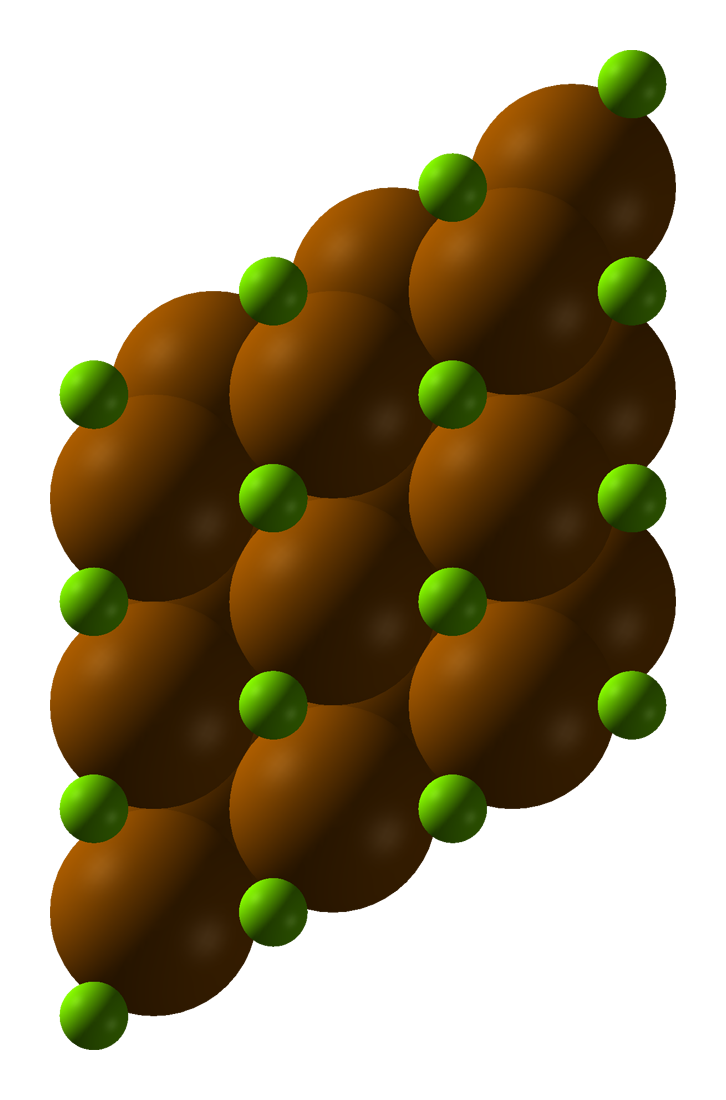
A space-filling representation of the crystal structure of magnesium polonide: Mg^{2+} ions are shown in green, while Po^{2−} ions are shown in brown.

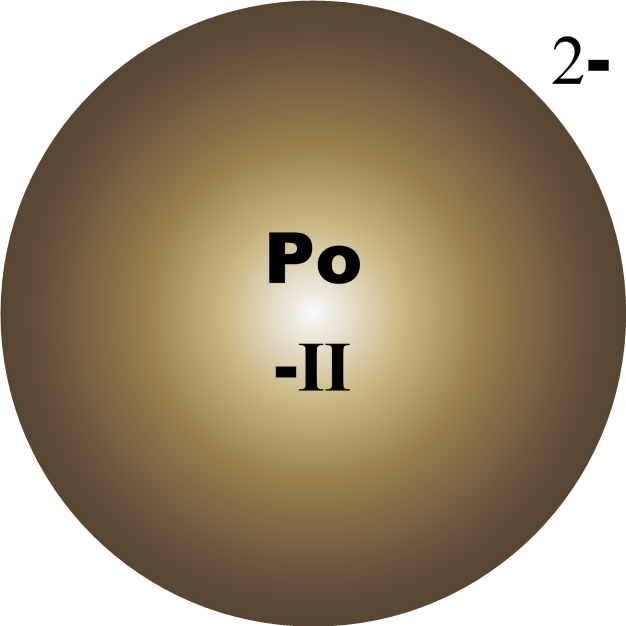
Polonide

A polonide is a chemical compound of the radioactive element polonium with any element less electronegative than polonium. Polonides are usually prepared by a direct reaction between the elements at temperatures of around 300–400 °C. They are amongst the most chemically stable compounds of polonium, and can be divided into two broad groups:

- ionic polonides, which appear to contain the Po^{2−} anion;
- intermetallic polonides, in which the bonding is more complex.

Some polonides are intermediate between these two cases and others are non-stoichiometric compounds. Alloys containing polonium are also classed as polonides. As polonium is immediately below tellurium in the periodic table, there are many chemical and structural similarities between polonides and tellurides.

== Naturally occurring polonides ==
Lead polonide (PbPo) occurs naturally, as lead is produced in the alpha decay of polonium.

== Ionic polonides ==
The polonides of the most electropositive metals show classic ionic structural types, and can be considered to contain the Po^{2−} anion.

Formula	Structure	Lattice parameter	Ref.
Na_{2}Po	anti-fluorite	747.3(4) pm	
CaPo	halite (NaCl)	651.0(4) pm	
BaPo	halite (NaCl)	711.9 pm	

With smaller cations, the structural types suggest greater polarization of the polonide ion, or greater covalency in the bonding. Magnesium polonide is unusual as it is not isostructural with magnesium telluride: MgTe has a wurtzite structure, although a nickeline-type phase has also been reported.

Formula	Structure	Lattice parameter	Ref.
MgPo	nickeline (NiAs)	a = 434.5 pm c = 707.7 pm	
BePo	sphalerite (ZnS)	582.7 pm	
CdPo	sphalerite (ZnS)	666.5 pm	
ZnPo	sphalerite (ZnS)	628(2) pm	

The effective radius of the polonide ion (Po^{2−}) can be calculated from the Shannon (1976) ionic radii of the cations: 216 pm for 4-coordination, 223 pm for 6-coordination, 225 pm for 8-coordination. The effect of the lanthanide contraction is clear, in that the 6-coordinate telluride ion (Te^{2−}) has an ionic radius of 221 pm.

The lanthanides also form sesquipolonides of formula Ln_{2}Po_{3}, which can be considered to be ionic compounds.

== Intermetallic polonides ==
The lanthanides form very stable polonides of formula LnPo with the halite (NaCl) structure. Many of them seem to involve trivalent lanthanides (though Sm, Eu, and Yb with more stable +2 oxidation states are exceptions), making them resemble electrides. They are isostructural to the lanthanide sulfides, selenides, and tellurides. These compounds are stable to at least 1600 °C (the melting point of thulium polonide, TmPo, is 2200 °C), in contrast to the ionic polonides (including the lanthanide sesquipolonides Ln_{2}Po_{3}), which decompose at around 600 °C. The thermal stability and non-volatility of these compounds (polonium metal boils at 962 °C) is important for their use in polonium-based heat sources.

Mercury and lead also form 1:1 polonides. Platinum forms a compound formulated as PtPo_{2}, while nickel forms a continuous series of phases NiPo_{x} (x = 1–2). Gold also forms solid solutions with polonium over a wide range of compositions, while bismuth and polonium are completely miscible. No reaction is observed between polonium and aluminium, carbon, iron, molybdenum, tantalum or tungsten.

== See also ==
- Polonium hydride, also known as hydrogen polonide
