= Lead polonide =

Identifiers
CAS Number	11141-11-0
3D model (JSmol)	Interactive image
ChemSpider	57534052
PubChem CID	71352574
CompTox Dashboard (EPA)	DTXSID00777528
- InChI: InChI=1S/Pb.Po Key: FNUHCZHQWJVXOP-UHFFFAOYSA-N
- SMILES: [Pb]=[Po]

Properties
Chemical formula	PbPo
Molar mass	416 g·mol^{−1}
Appearance	black crystals
Density	9.64 g·cm^{−3}
Melting point	550–630 °C(decomposes)

Related compounds
Other anions	Lead monoxide; Lead sulfide; Lead selenide; Lead telluride
Other cations	Beryllium polonide; Magnesium polonide; Calcium polonide; Strontium polonide; Barium polonide
- Except where otherwise noted, data are given for materials in their standard state (at 25 °C [77 °F], 100 kPa). Infobox references

Lead polonide is the polonide of lead, with the chemical formula of PbPo. It occurs naturally, as lead is produced in the alpha decay of polonium.

== Preparation ==
Lead polonide can be formed by reacting polonium vapour and lead under a vacuum.

== Properties ==
Lead polonide has a sodium chloride structure, which is the same as lead telluride. It has a cubic crystal structure, with the space group Fm3̅m (No. 225), with lattice constant a = 6.59 Å.
