= Polonium sulfide =

Names
- Other names Polonium monosulfide

Identifiers
CAS Number	19268-62-3
3D model (JSmol)	Interactive image
- InChI: InChI=1S/Po.S Key: PKZBITJUBFSEGA-UHFFFAOYSA-N
- SMILES: [Po]=[S]

Properties
Chemical formula	PoS
Molar mass	241.07 g/mol
Appearance	Black crystals
Melting point	500 °C (932 °F; 773 K)
Solubility in water	Insoluble

Related compounds
Related compounds	Chromium(III) sulfide
- Except where otherwise noted, data are given for materials in their standard state (at 25 °C [77 °F], 100 kPa). Infobox references

Polonium sulfide is an inorganic compound of polonium and sulfur with the chemical formula PoS. The compound is radioactive and forms black crystals.

== Synthesis ==
1. Passing hydrogen sulfide through an acidic solution of a polonium(II) salt:

PoCl_{2} + H_{2}S → PoS + 2 HCl

2. Reaction of ammonium sulfide aqueous solution with polonium(II) hydroxide:

(NH_{4})_{2}S + Po(OH)_{2} → 2 NH_{3} + 2 H_{2}O + PoS

== Physical properties ==
Polonium sulfide forms black solid crystals, insoluble in water, ammonium sulfide, ethanol, acetone, or toluene.

== Chemical properties ==
Polonium sulfide has strong reducing properties and can be oxidized by chlorine water, bromine water, sodium hypochlorite, and aqua regia. Polonium sulfide is also unstable to heating. It decomposes into elemental polonium and elemental sulfur when heated to 274.85°C in a vacuum:

PoS → Po + S

Reacts with concentrated acids:

PoS + 2 HCl → PoCl_{2} + H_{2}S

== Applications ==
Used in the isolation and purification of polonium.
