= Lithium tellurite =

Identifiers
CAS Number	14929-69-2
3D model (JSmol)	Interactive image
ChemSpider	19990397
PubChem CID	21124607
- InChI: InChI=1S/2Li.H2O3Te/c;;1-4(2)3/h;;(H2,1,2,3)/q2*+1;/p-2 Key: NBPOTQRWKBWQSQ-UHFFFAOYSA-L
- SMILES: [Li+].[Li+].[O-][Te](=O)[O-]

Properties
Chemical formula	Li_{2}O_{3}Te
Molar mass	189.48 g·mol^{−1}
Appearance	solid
- Except where otherwise noted, data are given for materials in their standard state (at 25 °C [77 °F], 100 kPa). Infobox references

Lithium tellurite is an inorganic compound, with the chemical formula Li_{2}TeO_{3}. It crystallises in the monoclinic crystal system, with space group C2/c. It can be prepared by reacting lithium oxide, lithium hydroxide or lithium carbonate with tellurium dioxide. It reacts with lithium fluoride at high temperatures in a 3:1 stoichiometric ratio to obtain Li_{7}(TeO_{3})_{3}F.
