= Polonium dibromide =

Names
- Systematic IUPAC name Polonium dibromide

Identifiers
CAS Number	66794-54-5
3D model (JSmol)	Interactive image
ChemSpider	103876442
PubChem CID	154130665
CompTox Dashboard (EPA)	DTXSID40726974
- InChI: InChI=1S/2BrH. Po/h2*1H;/q;;+2/p-2 Key: XAIILPQZTLHLLU-UHFFFAOYSA-L
- SMILES: [Br-].[Br-].[Po+2]

Properties
Chemical formula	PoBr_{2}
Molar mass	369.791 g mol^{−1}
Appearance	purple-brown crystalline solid
Melting point	270 °C (518 °F; 543 K) (decomposes) (sublimes at 110 °C)
Solubility	soluble in hydrobromic acid and ketones
- Except where otherwise noted, data are given for materials in their standard state (at 25 °C [77 °F], 100 kPa). Infobox references

Polonium dibromide (also known as polonium(II) bromide) is a chemical compound with the formula PoBr_{2}. This salt is a purple-brown crystalline solid at room temperature. It sublimes (decomposing slightly) at 110 °C/30 μ and decomposes when melted in nitrogen gas at 270–280 °C.

== Preparation ==
Polonium dibromide may be prepared by:

- thermal degradation of polonium tetrabromide (PoBr_{4}) in a vacuum at 200 °C;
- dehalogenation of polonium tetrabromide by hydrogen sulfide at low temperatures (however, this does not form pure polonium dibromide, even upon heating).

== Chemistry ==
Polonium dibromide forms purple solutions in hydrobromic acid (prepared similarly to solutions of polonium dichloride) and ketones, although the latter are rapidly oxidised to polonium(IV). Solid polonium dibromide is rapidly reduced to metallic polonium upon reaction with ammonia.
