= Chromium(III) telluride =

Names
- IUPAC name Chromium(III) telluride
- Other names Dichromium tritelluride

Identifiers
CAS Number	12053-39-3
3D model (JSmol)	Interactive image
ChemSpider	21241695
ECHA InfoCard	100.031.809
EC Number	235-003-8
PubChem CID	6381587
CompTox Dashboard (EPA)	DTXSID30923455
- InChI: InChI=1S/2Cr.3Te Key: PDJHBRMODJKXLQ-UHFFFAOYSA-N
- SMILES: [Te]=[Cr][Te][Cr]=[Te]

Properties
Chemical formula	Cr_{2}Te_{3}
Molar mass	486.792
Appearance	Dark gray powder
Density	6.6–7.0 g/cm3
Melting point	1,300 °C (2,370 °F; 1,570 K) approximation
Solubility in water	negligible

Hazards
- GHS labelling
Pictograms	(GHS07: Exclamation mark)
Signal word	Warning
Hazard statements	H302, H312, H315, H319, H332, H335
Precautionary statements	P261, P264, P270, P271, P280, P301+P312, P302+P352, P304+P312, P304+P340, P305+P351+P338, P312, P321, P322, P330, P332+P313, P337+P313, P362, P363, P403+P233, P405, P501

Related compounds
Other anions	Chromium(III) oxide Chromium(III) sulfide Chromium(III) selenide
- Except where otherwise noted, data are given for materials in their standard state (at 25 °C [77 °F], 100 kPa). Infobox references

Chromium telluride (Cr_{2}Te_{3}) is an inorganic chemical compound. It is composed of the chromium(III) cation and the telluride anion. It has a shadowy gray color, and has a hexagonal crystal structure.

== Properties ==
=== Thermodynamic ===
Chromium telluride samples that are highly saturated with tellurium were found to crystallize in a hexagonal structure, but trigonal lattice distortions are also possible.

=== Magnetic ===
Chromium telluride is strongly paramagnetic, and it can be used in the construction of nanocrystals. In addition, the compound also shows ferromagnetic properties. By creating thin films of chromium telluride, the compound can be tested by reflection high-energy electron diffraction (RHEED), scanning tunneling microscopy (STM), vibrating sample magnetometry, and other physical property measurements. RHEED patterns indicate the flat, smooth growth of chromium telluride film. STM testing shows that the surface atoms of the compound arrange themselves in a hexagonal pattern. The Curie temperature was found to be 180 K. When transitioning between paramagnetic and ferromagnetic forms of magnetism, the surrounding magnetic field collapse into two independent curves with a sole scaling equation. However, chromium telluride can still continue with a reversal of magnetism.

When being measured at room temperature, the anomalous Hall voltage of chromium telluride seems to consist of both negative anomalous and positive normal component. The negative anomalous component exhibits saturation against the intensity of the magnetic field, while the positive normal component can be ascribed to hole conduction. This is measured from room temperature to 400 °C with a-c sample current and d-c magnetic field.
