= Polonium dichloride =

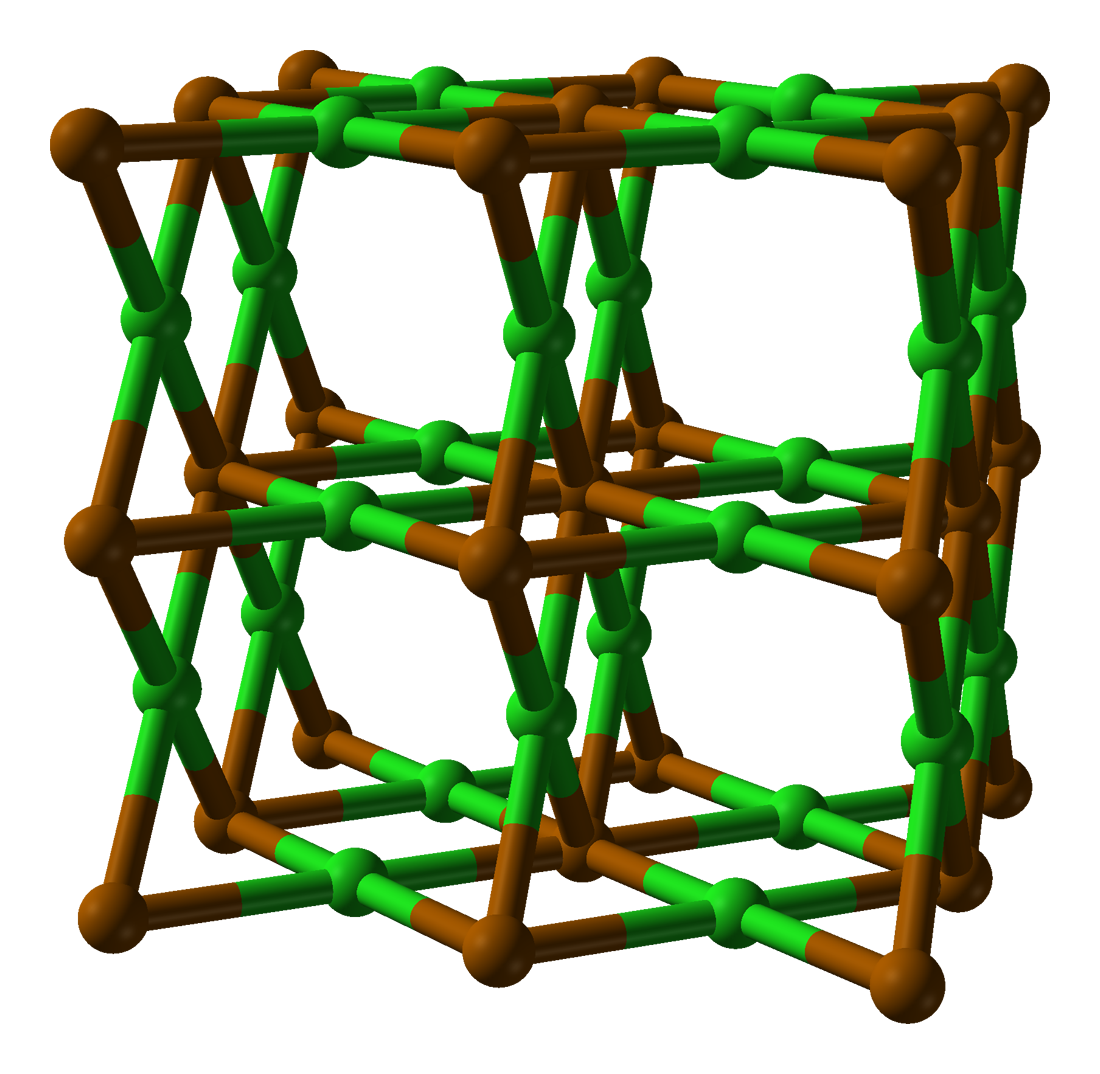

Identifiers
CAS Number	60816-56-0
3D model (JSmol)	Interactive image
ChemSpider	103875967
PubChem CID	144504549
- InChI: InChI=1S/2ClH.Po/h2*1H;/q;;+2/p-2 Key: DUSGZPHDYXXYGD-UHFFFAOYSA-L
- SMILES: Cl[Po]Cl

Properties
Chemical formula	PoCl_{2}
Molar mass	279.91 g/mol
Appearance	ruby-red solid
Density	6.50 g cm^{−3}
Melting point	355 °C (671 °F; 628 K) (sublimes at 130 °C)

Structure
Crystal structure	orthorhombic, oP3
Space group	Pmmm (No 47)
Lattice constant	a = 0.367 nm, b = 0.435 nm, c = 0.450 nm
- Except where otherwise noted, data are given for materials in their standard state (at 25 °C [77 °F], 100 kPa). verify (what is ?) Infobox references

Polonium dichloride is a chemical compound of the radioactive metalloid, polonium and chlorine. Its chemical formula is PoCl_{2}. It is an ionic salt.

== Structure ==
Polonium dichloride appears to crystallise with an orthorhombic unit cell in either the P222, Pmm2 or Pmmm space group, although this is likely a pseudo-cell. Alternatively, the true space group may be monoclinic or triclinic, with one or more cell angles close to 90°. Assuming the space group is P222, the structure exhibits distorted cubic coordination of Po as {PoCl_{8}} and distorted square planar coordination of Cl as {ClPo_{4}}.

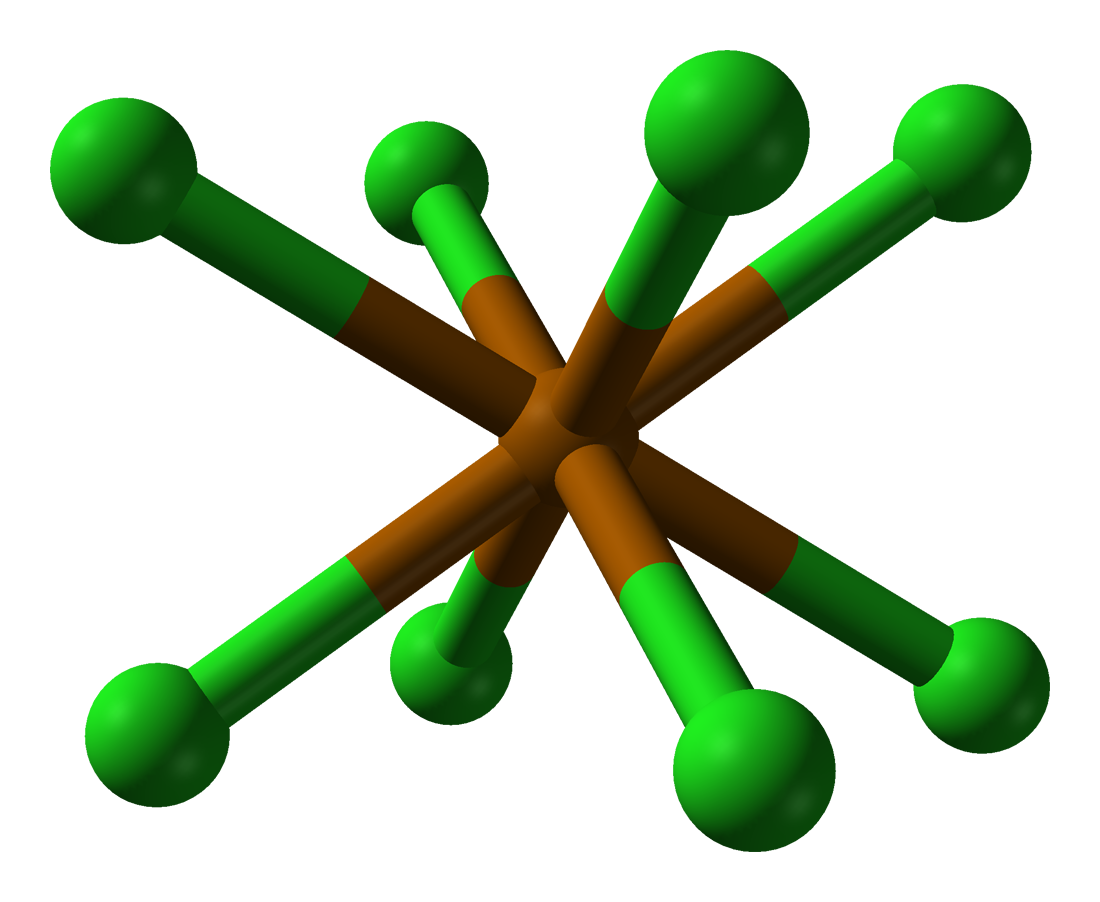
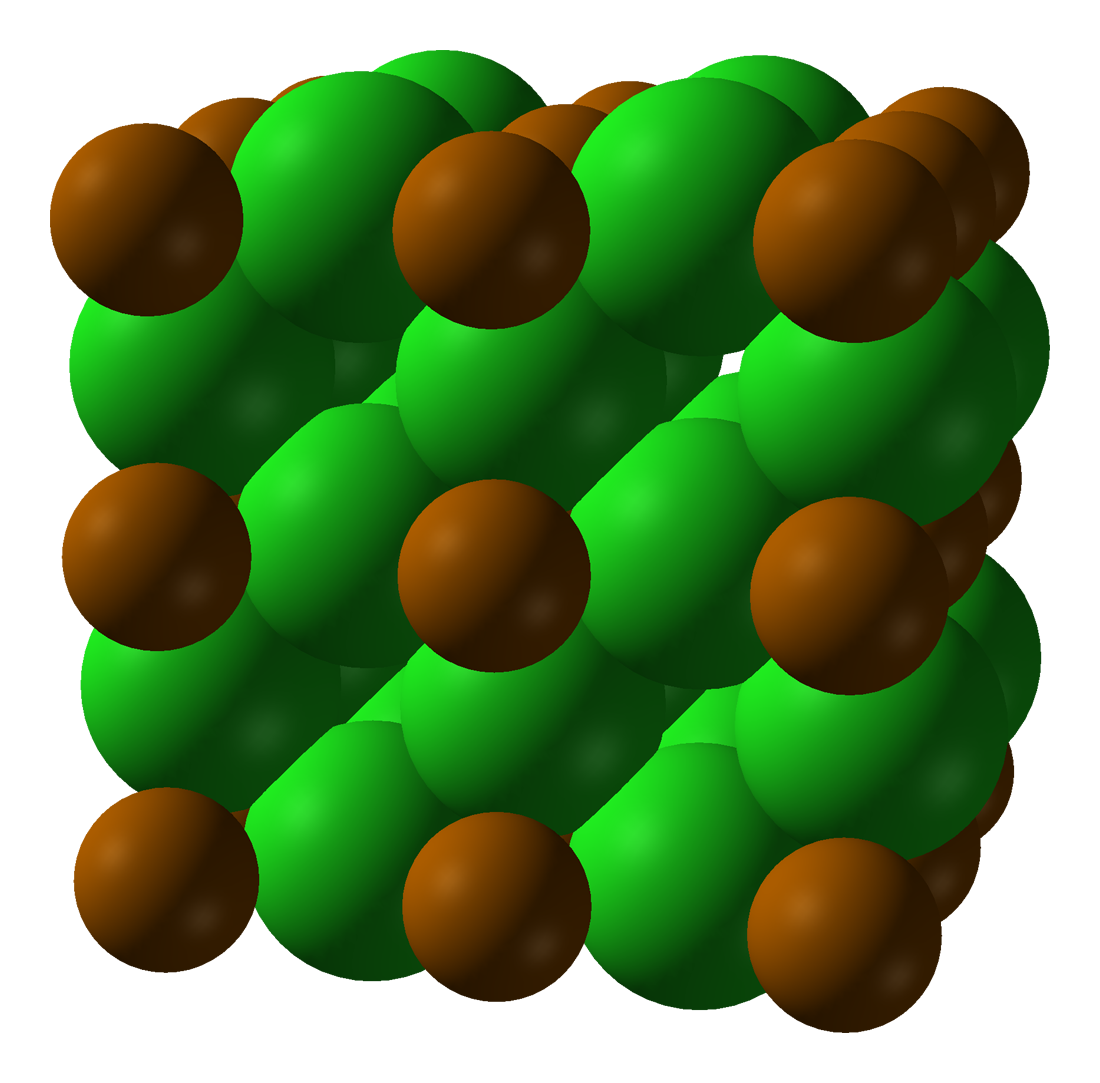

== Preparation ==
PoCl_{2} can be obtained either by halogenation of polonium metal or by dehalogenation of polonium tetrachloride, PoCl_{4}. Methods for dehalogenating PoCl_{4} include thermal decomposition at 300 °C, reduction of cold, slightly moist PoCl_{4} by sulfur dioxide; and heating PoCl_{4} in a stream of carbon monoxide or hydrogen sulfide at 150 °C.

== Reactions ==
PoCl_{2} dissolves in dilute hydrochloric acid to give a pink solution, which autoxidises to Po(IV). PoCl_{2} is rapidly oxidised by hydrogen peroxide or chlorine water. Addition of potassium hydroxide to the pink solution results in a dark brown precipitate – possibly hydrated PoO or Po(OH)_{2} – which is rapidly oxidised to Po(IV). With dilute nitric acid, PoCl_{2} forms a dark red solution followed by a flaky white precipitate of unknown composition.

== See also ==
- Polonium tetrachloride
