= Polonium(IV) sulfate =

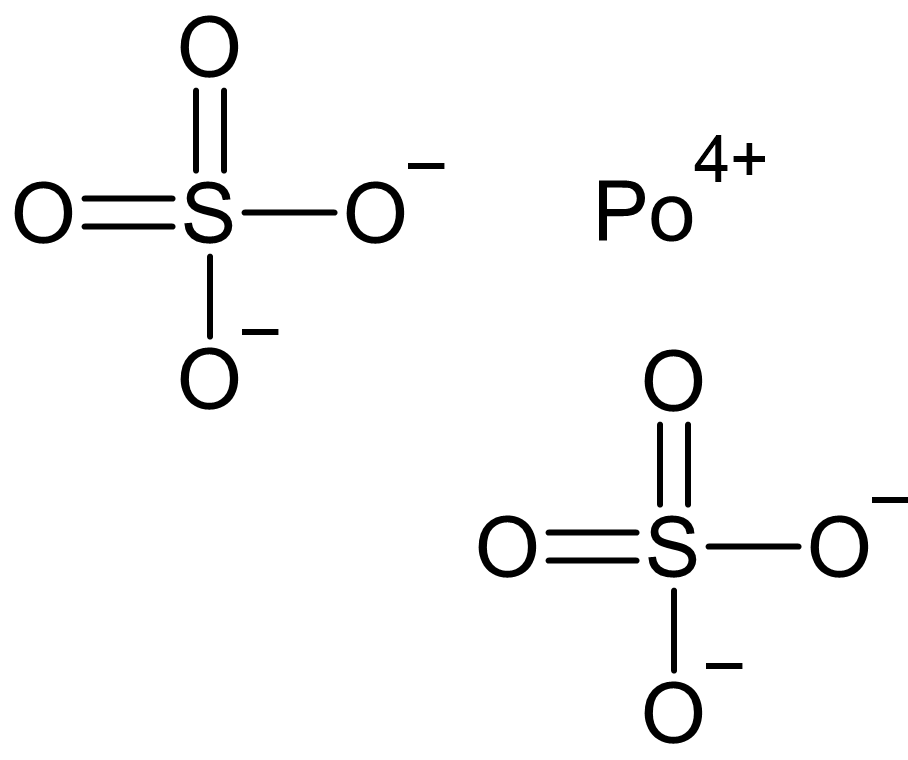

Identifiers
| CAS Number | 66256-57-3 |
| 3D model (JSmol) | Interactive image |
- InChI: InChI=1S/2H2O4S.Po/c2*1-5(2,3)4;/h2*(H2,1,2,3,4);/q;;+4/p-4 Key: MIJPRCZICLLYHP-UHFFFAOYSA-J
- SMILES: [O-]S(=O)(=O)[O-].[O-]S(=O)(=O)[O-].[Po+4]

Properties
| Chemical formula | Po(SO_{4})_{2} |
| Molar mass | 401 g·mol^{−1} (anhydrous) |
| Appearance | dark purple crystalline solid (anhydrous) white or colourless crystals (hydrate) |
- Except where otherwise noted, data are given for materials in their standard state (at 25 °C [77 °F], 100 kPa). Infobox references

Polonium(IV) sulfate is an inorganic compound, a salt of polonium and the sulfate anion with the chemical formula of Po(SO_{4})_{2}. As anhydrous, it forms dark purple crystalline solid, and as a hydrate, it forms colourless or white crystals, and is soluble in water. It can be obtained by the reaction of polonium tetrachloride (or hydrated polonium dioxide) and sulfuric acid. Polonium(IV) sulfate can be reduced to PoSO_{4} by hydroxylamine in acidic solutions; it decomposes to polonium dioxide at 550 °C. It is radioactive and produces gases as it decays.
