= Polonium trioxide =

Chemical compound

Names
- Systematic IUPAC name Polonium trioxide

Identifiers
CAS Number	12143-28-1
3D model (JSmol)	Interactive image
- InChI: InChI=1S/3O.Po Key: HAWBUZBHAQBBEC-UHFFFAOYSA-N
- SMILES: O=[Po](=O)=O

Properties
Chemical formula	PoO_{3}
Molar mass	256.98 g/mol
- Except where otherwise noted, data are given for materials in their standard state (at 25 °C [77 °F], 100 kPa). Infobox references

Polonium trioxide (also known as polonium(VI) oxide) is a chemical compound with the formula PoO_{3}. It is one of three oxides of polonium, the other two being polonium monoxide (PoO) and polonium dioxide (PoO_{2}). It is an interchalcogen that has so far only been detected in trace amounts.

== Preparation ==
It has been reported that trace quantities of polonium trioxide form during the anodic deposition of polonium from acidic solutions. Although there is no experimental evidence for this, the fact that the deposit dissolves in hydrogen peroxide suggests that it contains polonium in a high oxidation state. It has been predicted that polonium trioxide may be formed by heating polonium dioxide and chromium trioxide together in air.

=== Difficulty of preparation of polonium(VI) compounds ===
It is very difficult to oxidize polonium beyond Po(IV); for example, the only hexahalide of polonium is the hexafluoride, PoF_{6}, and fluorine is already the most electronegative element (though polonium hexaiodide was once reportedly formed in the vapour phase, it immediately decomposed). However, the difficulty in obtaining polonium trioxide and polonates (containing the PoO^{2−}_{4} anion, analogous to sulfate, selenate, and tellurate) by direct oxidation of Po(IV) compounds may be due to the fact that polonium-210, while the most easily available isotope of polonium, is strongly radioactive. Similar work with curium shows that it is easier to achieve higher oxidation states with longer-lived isotopes; thus, it may be easier to obtain Po(VI) (especially polonium trioxide) using the longer-lived polonium-208 or polonium-209. It has been suggested that Po(VI) might be more stabilized in anions such as PoF^{2−}_{8} or PoO^{6−}_{6}, like other high oxidation states.
