= Polonium =

Polonium, _{84}Po
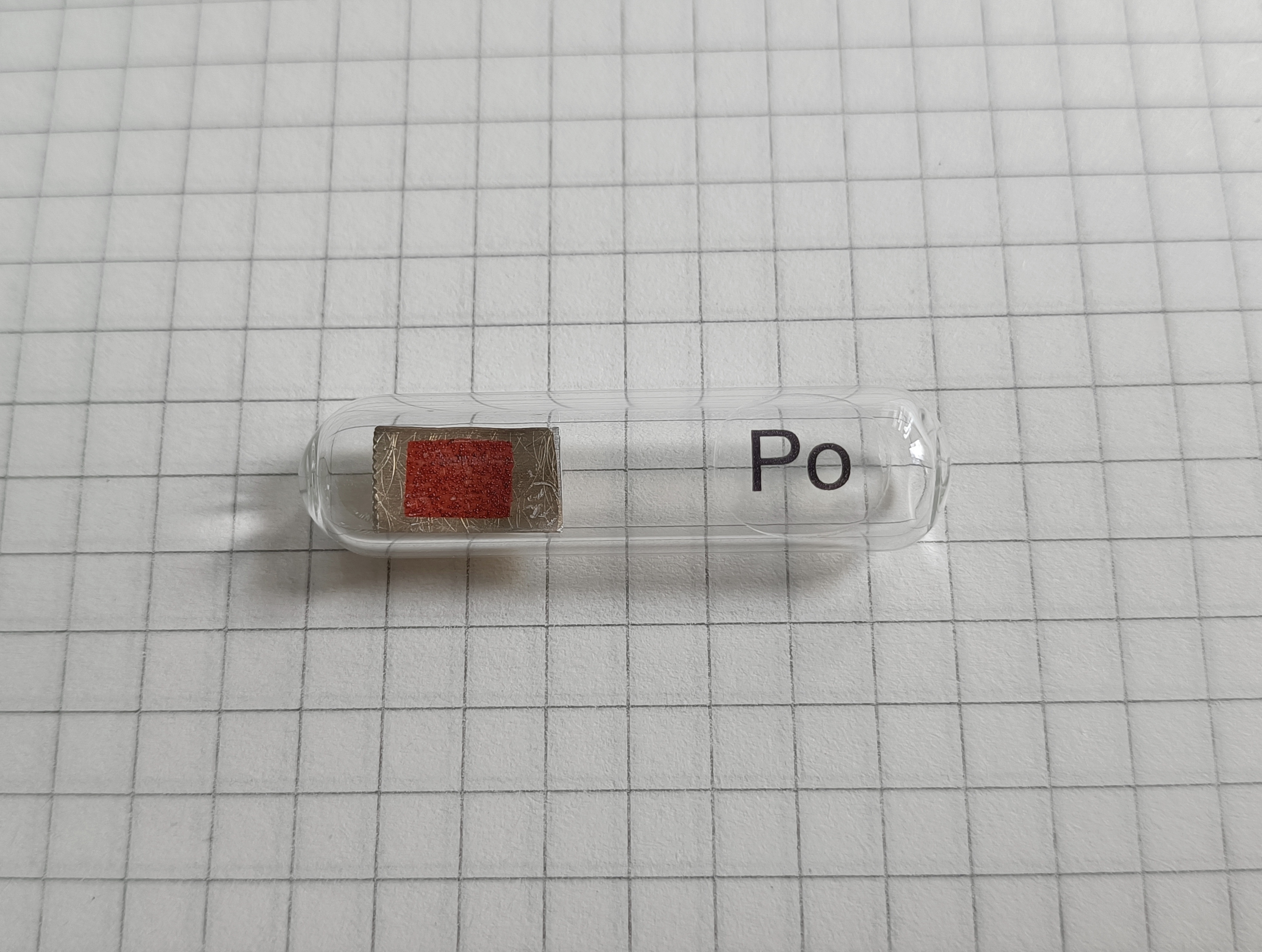

Polonium
- Pronunciation: /pəˈloʊniəm/ (pə-LOH-nee-əm)
- Allotropes: α, β
- Appearance: silvery
- Mass number: [209]

Polonium in the periodic table
Hydrogen																															Helium
Lithium	Beryllium																									Boron	Carbon	Nitrogen	Oxygen	Fluorine	Neon
Sodium	Magnesium																									Aluminium	Silicon	Phosphorus	Sulfur	Chlorine	Argon
Potassium	Calcium															Scandium	Titanium	Vanadium	Chromium	Manganese	Iron	Cobalt	Nickel	Copper	Zinc	Gallium	Germanium	Arsenic	Selenium	Bromine	Krypton
Rubidium	Strontium															Yttrium	Zirconium	Niobium	Molybdenum	Technetium	Ruthenium	Rhodium	Palladium	Silver	Cadmium	Indium	Tin	Antimony	Tellurium	Iodine	Xenon
Caesium	Barium	Lanthanum	Cerium	Praseodymium	Neodymium	Promethium	Samarium	Europium	Gadolinium	Terbium	Dysprosium	Holmium	Erbium	Thulium	Ytterbium	Lutetium	Hafnium	Tantalum	Tungsten	Rhenium	Osmium	Iridium	Platinum	Gold	Mercury (element)	Thallium	Lead	Bismuth	Polonium	Astatine	Radon
Francium	Radium	Actinium	Thorium	Protactinium	Uranium	Neptunium	Plutonium	Americium	Curium	Berkelium	Californium	Einsteinium	Fermium	Mendelevium	Nobelium	Lawrencium	Rutherfordium	Dubnium	Seaborgium	Bohrium	Hassium	Meitnerium	Darmstadtium	Roentgenium	Copernicium	Nihonium	Flerovium	Moscovium	Livermorium	Tennessine	Oganesson
Te
↑
Po
↓
Lv
bismuth ← polonium → astatine
- Atomic number (Z): 84
- Group: group 16 (chalcogens)
- Period: period 6
- Block: p-block
- Electron configuration: [Xe] 4f^{14} 5d^{10} 6s^{2} 6p^{4}
- Electrons per shell: 2, 8, 18, 32, 18, 6

Physical properties
- Phase at STP: solid
- Melting point: 527 K (254 °C, 489 °F)
- Boiling point: 1235 K (962 °C, 1764 °F)
- Density (near r.t.): α-Po: 9.196 g/cm^{3} β-Po: 9.398 g/cm^{3}
- Heat of fusion: ca. 13 kJ/mol
- Heat of vaporization: 102.91 kJ/mol
- Molar heat capacity: 26.4 J/(mol·K)
Vapor pressure
P (Pa)	1	10	100	1 k	10 k	100 k
at T (K)				(846)	1003	1236

Atomic properties
- Oxidation states: common: −2, +2, +4 +5 +6,
- Electronegativity: Pauling scale: 2.0
- Ionization energies: 1st: 812.1 kJ/mol
- Atomic radius: empirical: 168 pm
- Covalent radius: 140±4 pm
- Van der Waals radius: 197 pm
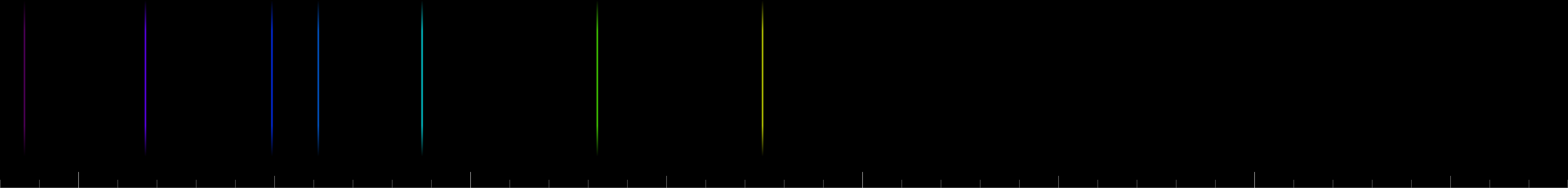
- Spectral lines of polonium

Other properties
- Natural occurrence: from decay
- Crystal structure: cubic α-Po

- Crystal structure: rhombohedral β-Po
- Thermal expansion: 23.5 µm/(m⋅K) (at 25 °C)
- Thermal conductivity: 20 W/(m⋅K) (?)
- Electrical resistivity: α-Po: 0.40 µΩ⋅m (at 0 °C)
- Magnetic ordering: nonmagnetic
- CAS Number: 7440-08-6

History
- Naming: after Polonia, Latin for Poland, homeland of Marie Curie
- Discovery: Pierre and Marie Curie (1898)
- First isolation: William H. Beamer and Charles R. Maxwell (1946)

Isotopes of polonium
Main isotopes			Decay	
Isotope	abundance	half-life (t_{1/2})	mode	product
^{206}Po	synth	8.8 d	β^{+}94.5%	^{206}Bi
^{206}Po	synth	8.8 d	α5.45%	^{202}Pb
^{208}Po	synth	2.898 y	α	^{204}Pb
^{208}Po	synth	2.898 y	β^{+}<0.01%	^{208}Bi
^{209}Po	synth	124 y	α99.5%	^{205}Pb
^{209}Po	synth	124 y	β^{+}0.454%	^{209}Bi
^{210}Po	trace	138.376 d	α	^{206}Pb

Polonium is a chemical element; it has symbol Po and atomic number 84. A rare and highly radioactive metal (although sometimes classified as a metalloid) with no stable isotopes, polonium is a chalcogen and chemically similar to selenium and tellurium, though its metallic character resembles that of its horizontal neighbours in the periodic table: thallium, lead, and bismuth. Due to the short half-life of all its isotopes, its natural occurrence is limited to tiny traces of the fleeting polonium-210 (with a half-life of 138 days) in uranium ores, as it is the penultimate daughter of natural uranium-238. Though two longer-lived isotopes exist (polonium-209 with a half-life of 124 years and polonium-208 with a half-life of 2.898 years), they are much more difficult to produce. Today, polonium is usually produced in milligram quantities by the neutron irradiation of bismuth. Due to its intense radioactivity, which results in the radiolysis of chemical bonds and radioactive self-heating, its chemistry has mostly been investigated on the trace scale only.

Polonium was discovered on 18 August 1898 by Marie Skłodowska-Curie and Pierre Curie, when it was extracted from the uranium ore pitchblende and identified solely by its strong radioactivity: it was the first element to be discovered in this way. Polonium was named after Marie Skłodowska-Curie's homeland of Poland, which at the time was partitioned between three countries. Polonium has few applications, and those are related to its radioactivity: as heaters in space probes, antistatic devices, sources of neutrons and alpha particles, and poison. It is extremely dangerous to humans.

== Characteristics ==
=== Alpha emissions ===
^{210}Po is an alpha emitter that has a half-life of 138.4 days; it decays directly to its stable daughter isotope, ^{206}Pb. A milligram (5 curies) of ^{210}Po emits about as many alpha particles per second as 5 grams of ^{226}Ra, which means it is 5,000 times more radioactive than radium. A few curies (1 curie equals 37 gigabecquerels, 1 Ci = 37 GBq) of ^{210}Po emit a blue glow which is caused by ionisation of the surrounding air. About one in 100,000 alpha emissions causes an excitation in the nucleus which then results in the emission of a gamma ray with a maximum energy of 803 keV.

=== Solid state form ===
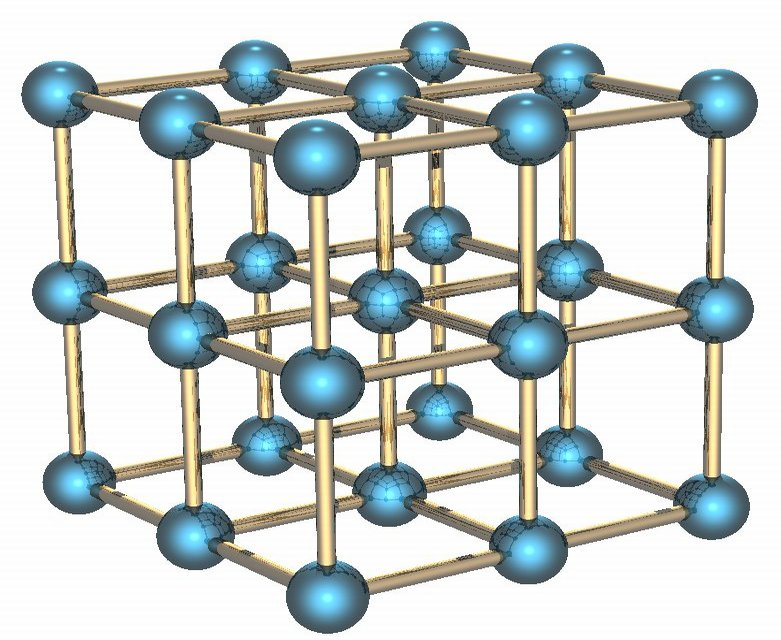
The alpha form of solid polonium

Polonium is a radioactive element that exists in two metallic allotropes. The alpha form is the only known example of a simple cubic crystal structure in a single atom basis at STP (space group Pm3̅m, no. 221). The unit cell has an edge length of 335.2 picometers; the beta form is rhombohedral. The structure of polonium has been characterized by X-ray diffraction and electron diffraction.

^{210}Po has the ability to become airborne with ease: if a sample is heated in air to 55 °C (131 °F), 50% of it is vaporized in 45 hours to form diatomic Po_{2} molecules, even though the melting point of polonium is 254 °C (489 °F) and its boiling point is 962 °C (1,764 °F). More than one hypothesis exists for how polonium does this; one suggestion is that small clusters of polonium atoms are spalled off by the alpha decay.

=== Chemistry ===
The chemistry of polonium is similar to that of tellurium, although it also shows some similarities to its neighbor bismuth due to its metallic character. Polonium dissolves readily in dilute acids but is only slightly soluble in alkalis. Polonium solutions are first colored in pink by the Po^{2+} ions, but then rapidly become yellow because alpha radiation from polonium ionizes the solvent and converts Po^{2+} into Po^{4+}. As polonium also emits alpha-particles after disintegration, this process is accompanied by bubbling and emission of heat and light by glassware due to the absorbed alpha particles; as a result, polonium solutions are volatile and will evaporate within days unless sealed. At pH about 1, polonium ions are readily hydrolyzed and complexed by acids such as oxalic acid, citric acid, and tartaric acid.

==== Compounds ====
Polonium has no common compounds, and almost all of its compounds are synthetically created; more than 50 of those are known. The most stable class of polonium compounds are polonides, which are prepared by direct reaction of two elements. Na_{2}Po has the antifluorite structure, the polonides of Ca, Ba, Hg, Pb and lanthanides form a NaCl lattice, BePo and CdPo have the wurtzite and MgPo the nickel arsenide structure. Most polonides decompose upon heating to about 600 °C, except for HgPo that decomposes at ~300 °C and the lanthanide polonides, which do not decompose but melt at temperatures above 1000 °C. For example, the polonide of praseodymium (PrPo) melts at 1250 °C, and that of thulium (TmPo) melts at 2200 °C. PbPo is one of the very few naturally occurring polonium compounds, as polonium alpha decays to form lead.

Polonium hydride (PoH_{2}) is a volatile liquid at room temperature prone to dissociation; it is thermally unstable. Water is the only other known hydrogen chalcogenide which is a liquid at room temperature; however, this is due to hydrogen bonding. The three oxides, PoO, PoO_{2} and PoO_{3}, are the products of oxidation of polonium.

Halides of the structure PoX_{2}, PoX_{4} and PoF_{6} are known. They are soluble in the corresponding hydrogen halides, i.e., PoCl_{x} in HCl, PoBr_{x} in HBr and PoI_{4} in HI. Polonium dihalides are formed by direct reaction of the elements or by reduction of PoCl_{4} with SO_{2} and with PoBr_{4} with H_{2}S at room temperature. Tetrahalides can be obtained by reacting polonium dioxide with HCl, HBr or HI.

Other polonium compounds include the polonite, potassium polonite; various polonate solutions; and the acetate, bromate, carbonate, citrate, chromate, cyanide, formate, (II) or (IV) hydroxide, nitrate, selenate, selenite, monosulfide, sulfate, disulfate or sulfite salts.

A limited organopolonium chemistry is known, mostly restricted to dialkyl and diaryl polonides (R_{2}Po), triarylpolonium halides (Ar_{3}PoX), and diarylpolonium dihalides (Ar_{2}PoX_{2}). Polonium also forms soluble compounds with some ligands, such as 2,3-butanediol and thiourea.

Polonium compounds
Formula	Color	m.p. (°C)	Sublimation temp. (°C)	Symmetry	Pearson symbol	Space group	No	a (pm)	b(pm)	c(pm)	Z	ρ (g/cm^{3})	ref
PoO	black												
PoO_{2}	pale yellow	500 (dec.)	885	fcc	cF12	Fm3̅m	225	563.7	563.7	563.7	4	8.94	
PoH_{2}		-35.5											
PoCl_{2}	dark ruby red	355	130	orthorhombic	oP3	Pmmm	47	367	435	450	1	6.47	
PoBr_{2}	purple-brown	270 (dec.)											
PoCl_{4}	yellow	300	200	monoclinic									
PoBr_{4}	red	330 (dec.)		fcc	cF100	Fm3̅m	225	560	560	560	4		
PoI_{4}	black												

Oxides

- PoO
- PoO_{2}
- PoO_{3}

Hydrides

- PoH_{2}

Halides

- PoX_{2} (except PoF_{2})
- PoX_{4}
- PoF_{6}
- PoBr_{2}Cl_{2} (salmon pink)

=== Isotopes ===
All nuclear data not otherwise stated is from the standard source:

There are 42 known isotopes of polonium (_{84}Po), all radioactive, stretching from ^{186}Po to ^{227}Po. The isotopes 210 through 218 occur naturally in the four principal decay chains. In terms of curies they are mostly of even mass number, coming from uranium-238 and thorium-232, with smaller amounts of 211 and 215 from uranium-235, and very little with mass number 213 coming from neptunium-237, and much less with mass number 217 coming from a rare branch of the neptunium decay chain. ^{210}Po has the longest half-life by far (138.376 days) and is, therefore, the most abundant by far in terms of moles or mass. It is also the most easily synthesized isotope, by neutron capture on natural bismuth, and so by far the most abundant artificial isotope as well.

Two other isotopes have longer lives: ^{209}Po with a half-life of 124 years and ^{208}Po with a half-life of 2.898 years. Both are made by using a cyclotron to bombard bismuth with protons.

== History ==
Tentatively called "radium F", polonium was discovered by Marie and Pierre Curie in July 1898, and was named after Marie Curie's native land of Poland (Latin: Polonia). Poland at the time was under Russian, German, and Austro-Hungarian partition, and did not exist as an independent country. It was Curie's hope that naming the element after her native land would publicize its lack of independence. Polonium may be the first element named to highlight a political controversy.

This element was the first one discovered by the Curies while they were investigating the cause of pitchblende radioactivity. Pitchblende, after removal of the radioactive elements uranium and thorium, was more radioactive than the uranium and thorium combined. This spurred the Curies to search for additional radioactive elements. They first separated out polonium from pitchblende in July 1898, and five months later, also isolated radium. German scientist Willy Marckwald successfully isolated 3 milligrams of polonium in 1902, though at the time he believed it was a new element, which he dubbed "radio-tellurium", and it was not until 1905 that it was demonstrated to be the same as polonium.

In the United States, polonium was produced as part of the Manhattan Project's Dayton Project during World War II. Polonium and beryllium were the key ingredients of the 'Urchin' initiator at the center of the bomb's spherical pit. 'Urchin' initiated the nuclear chain reaction at the moment of prompt-criticality to ensure that the weapon did not fizzle. 'Urchin' was used in early U.S. weapons; subsequent U.S. weapons utilized a pulse neutron generator for the same purpose.

Much of the basic physics of polonium was classified until after the war. The fact that a polonium-beryllium (Po-Be) initiator was used in the gun-type nuclear weapons was classified until the 1960s.

The Atomic Energy Commission and the Manhattan Project funded human experiments using polonium on five people at the University of Rochester between 1943 and 1947. The people were administered between 9 and 22 microcuries (330 and 810 kBq) of polonium to study its excretion.

== Occurrence and production ==
Polonium is a very rare element in nature because of the short half-lives of all its isotopes. Nine isotopes, from 210 to 218 inclusive, occur in traces as decay products: ^{210}Po, ^{214}Po, and ^{218}Po occur in the decay chain of ^{238}U; ^{211}Po and ^{215}Po occur in the decay chain of ^{235}U; ^{212}Po and ^{216}Po occur in the decay chain of ^{232}Th; and ^{213}Po and ^{217}Po occur in the decay chain of ^{237}Np. (No primordial ^{237}Np survives, but traces of it are continuously regenerated through (n,2n) knockout reactions in natural ^{238}U. The ratio of neptunium to uranium is around 1 to 10^{12}, but having a shorter half-life the ratio in terms of radioactivity is around 1 to 10^{9}. ^{217}Po only occurs if ^{225}Ra decays to ^{221}Rn, with a probability of 0.000026, and then the ^{221}Rn decays to ^{217}Po with probability 0.22.) Of these, ^{210}Po is the only isotope with a half-life longer than 3 minutes.

Polonium can be found in uranium ores at about 0.1 mg per metric ton (1 part in 10^{10}), which is approximately 0.2% of the abundance of radium. The amounts in the Earth's crust are not harmful. Polonium has been found in tobacco smoke from tobacco leaves grown with phosphate fertilizers.

Because it is present in small concentrations, isolation of polonium from natural sources is a tedious process. The largest batch of the element ever extracted, performed in the first half of the 20th century, contained only 40 Ci (1.5 TBq) (9 mg) of polonium-210 and was obtained by processing 37 tonnes of residues from radium production. Polonium is now usually obtained by irradiating bismuth with high-energy neutrons or protons.

In 1934, an experiment showed that when natural ^{209}Bi is bombarded with neutrons, ^{210}Bi is created, which then decays to ^{210}Po via beta-minus decay. By irradiating certain bismuth salts containing light element nuclei such as beryllium, a cascading (α,n) reaction can also be induced to produce ^{210}Po in large quantities. The final purification is done pyrochemically followed by liquid-liquid extraction techniques. Polonium may now be made in milligram amounts in this procedure which uses high neutron fluxes found in nuclear reactors. Only about 100 grams are produced each year, practically all of it in Russia, making polonium exceedingly rare.

This process can cause problems in lead-bismuth based liquid metal cooled nuclear reactors such as those used in the Soviet Navy's K-27. Measures must be taken in these reactors to deal with the unwanted possibility of ^{210}Po being released from the coolant.

The longer-lived isotopes of polonium, ^{208}Po and ^{209}Po, can be formed by proton or deuteron bombardment of bismuth using a cyclotron. Other more neutron-deficient and more unstable isotopes can be formed by the irradiation of platinum with carbon nuclei.

== Applications ==
Polonium-based sources of alpha particles were produced in the former Soviet Union. Such sources were applied for measuring the thickness of industrial coatings via attenuation of alpha radiation.

Because of intense alpha radiation, a one-gram sample of ^{210}Po will spontaneously heat up to above 500 °C (932 °F) generating about 140 watts of power. Therefore, ^{210}Po is used as an atomic heat source to power radioisotope thermoelectric generators via thermoelectric materials. For example, ^{210}Po heat sources were used in the Lunokhod 1 (1970) and Lunokhod 2 (1973) Moon rovers to keep their internal components warm during the lunar nights, as well as the Kosmos 84 and 90 satellites (1965).

The alpha particles emitted by polonium can be converted to neutrons using beryllium oxide, at a rate of 93 neutrons per million alpha particles. Po-BeO mixtures are used as passive neutron sources with a gamma-ray-to-neutron production ratio of 1.13 ± 0.05, lower than for nuclear fission-based neutron sources. Examples of Po-BeO mixtures or alloys used as neutron sources are a neutron trigger or initiator for nuclear weapons and for inspections of oil wells. About 1500 sources of this type, with an individual activity of 1,850 Ci (68 TBq), had been used annually in the Soviet Union.

Polonium was also part of brushes or more complex tools that eliminate static charges in photographic plates, textile mills, paper rolls, sheet plastics, and on substrates (such as automotive) prior to the application of coatings. Alpha particles emitted by polonium ionize air molecules that neutralize charges on the nearby surfaces. Some anti-static brushes contain up to 500 microcuries (20 MBq) of ^{210}Po as a source of charged particles for neutralizing static electricity. In the US, devices with no more than 500 μCi (19 MBq) of (sealed) ^{210}Po per unit can be bought in any amount under a "general license", which means that a buyer need not be registered by any authorities. Polonium needs to be replaced in these devices nearly every year because of its short half-life; it is also highly radioactive and therefore has been mostly replaced by less dangerous beta particle sources.

Tiny amounts of ^{210}Po are sometimes used in the laboratory and for teaching purposes—typically of the order of 4–40 kBq (0.11–1.08 μCi), in the form of sealed sources, with the polonium deposited on a substrate or in a resin or polymer matrix—are often exempt from licensing by the NRC and similar authorities as they are not considered hazardous. Small amounts of ^{210}Po are manufactured for sale to the public in the United States as "needle sources" for laboratory experimentation, and they are retailed by scientific supply companies. The polonium is a layer of plating which in turn is plated with a material such as gold, which allows the alpha radiation (used in experiments such as cloud chambers) to pass while preventing the polonium from being released and presenting a toxic hazard.

Polonium spark plugs were marketed by Firestone from 1940 to 1953. While the amount of radiation from the plugs was minuscule and not a threat to the consumer, the benefits of such plugs quickly diminished after approximately a month because of polonium's short half-life and because buildup on the conductors would block the radiation that improved engine performance. (The premise behind the polonium spark plug, as well as Alfred Matthew Hubbard's prototype radium plug that preceded it, was that the radiation would improve ionization of the fuel in the cylinder and thus allow the motor to fire more quickly and efficiently.)

== Biology and toxicity ==
=== Overview ===
Polonium can be hazardous and has no biological role. By mass, polonium-210 is around 250,000 times more toxic than hydrogen cyanide (the median lethal dose for ^{210}Po is less than 1 microgram for an average adult (see below) compared with about 250 milligrams for hydrogen cyanide). The main hazard is its intense radioactivity (as an alpha emitter), which makes it difficult to handle safely. Even in microgram amounts, handling ^{210}Po is extremely dangerous, requiring specialized equipment (a negative pressure alpha glove box equipped with high-performance filters), adequate monitoring, and strict handling procedures to avoid any contamination. Alpha particles emitted by polonium will damage organic tissue easily if polonium is ingested, inhaled, or absorbed, although they do not penetrate the epidermis and hence are not hazardous as long as the alpha particles remain outside the body and do not come near the eyes, which are living tissue. Wearing chemically resistant and intact gloves is a mandatory precaution to avoid transcutaneous diffusion of polonium directly through the skin. Polonium delivered in concentrated nitric acid can easily diffuse through inadequate gloves (e.g., latex gloves) or the acid may damage the gloves.

Polonium does not have toxic chemical properties.

It has been reported that some microbes can methylate polonium by the action of methylcobalamin. This is similar to the way in which mercury, selenium, and tellurium are methylated in living things to create organometallic compounds. Studies investigating the metabolism of polonium-210 in rats have shown that only 0.002 to 0.009% of polonium-210 ingested is excreted as volatile polonium-210.

=== Acute effects ===
The median lethal dose (LD_{50}) for acute radiation exposure is about 4.5 Sieverts (Sv). The committed effective dose equivalent ^{210}Po is 0.51 μSv/Becquerel (Bq) if ingested, and 2.5 μSv/Bq if inhaled. A fatal 4.5 Sv dose can be caused by ingesting 8.8 MBq (240 μCi), about 50 nanograms (ng), or inhaling 1.8 MBq (49 μCi), about 10 ng. One gram of ^{210}Po could thus in theory poison 20 million people, of whom 10 million would die. The actual toxicity of ^{210}Po is lower than these estimates because radiation exposure that is spread out over several weeks (the biological half-life of polonium in humans is 30 to 50 days) is less damaging than an instantaneous dose. It has been estimated that a median lethal dose of ^{210}Po is 15 megabecquerels (0.41 mCi), or 0.89 micrograms (μg). For comparison, one grain of table salt is about 0.06 mg = 60 μg.

=== Long term (chronic) effects ===
In addition to the acute effects, radiation exposure (both internal and external) carries a long-term risk of death from cancer of 5–10% per Sv. The general population is exposed to small amounts of polonium as a radon daughter in indoor air; the isotopes ^{214}Po and ^{218}Po are thought to cause the majority of the estimated 15,000–22,000 lung cancer deaths in the US every year that have been attributed to indoor radon. Tobacco smoking causes additional exposure to polonium.

=== Regulatory exposure limits and handling ===
The maximum allowable body burden for ingested ^{210}Po is only 1.1 kBq (30 nCi), which is equivalent to a particle massing only 6.8 picograms. The maximum permissible workplace concentration of airborne ^{210}Po is about 10 Bq/m^{3} (3×10^{−10} μCi/cm^{3}). The target organs for polonium in humans are the spleen and liver. As the spleen (150 g) and the liver (1.3 to 3 kg) are much smaller than the rest of the body, if the polonium is concentrated in these vital organs, it is a greater threat to life than the dose which would be suffered (on average) by the whole body if it were spread evenly throughout the body, in the same way as caesium or tritium (as T_{2}O).

^{210}Po is widely used in industry, and readily available with little regulation or restriction. In the US, a tracking system run by the Nuclear Regulatory Commission was implemented in 2007 to register purchases of more than 16 curies (590 GBq) of polonium-210 (enough to make up 5,000 lethal doses). The IAEA "is said to be considering tighter regulations ... There is talk that it might tighten the polonium reporting requirement by a factor of 10, to 1.6 curies (59 GBq)." As of 2013, this is still the only alpha emitting byproduct material available, as a NRC Exempt Quantity, which may be held without a radioactive material license.

Polonium and its compounds must be handled with caution inside special alpha glove boxes, equipped with HEPA filters and continuously maintained under depression to prevent the radioactive materials from leaking out. Gloves made of natural rubber (latex) do not properly withstand chemical attacks, a.o. by concentrated nitric acid (e.g., 6 M HNO_{3}) commonly used to keep polonium in solution while minimizing its sorption onto glass. They do not provide sufficient protection against the contamination from polonium (diffusion of ^{210}Po solution through the intact latex membrane, or worse, direct contact through tiny holes and cracks produced when the latex begins to suffer degradation by acids or UV from ambient light); additional surgical gloves are necessary (inside the glovebox to protect the main gloves when handling strong acids and bases, and also from outside to protect the operator hands against ^{210}Po contamination from diffusion, or direct contact through glove defects). Chemically more resistant, and also denser, neoprene and butyl gloves shield alpha particles emitted by polonium better than natural rubber. The use of natural rubber gloves is not recommended for handling ^{210}Po solutions.

=== Cases of poisoning ===
Despite the element's highly hazardous properties, circumstances in which polonium poisoning can occur are rare. Its extreme scarcity in nature, the short half-lives of all its isotopes, the specialised facilities and equipment needed to obtain any significant quantity, and safety precautions against laboratory accidents all make harmful exposure events unlikely. As such, only a handful of cases of radiation poisoning specifically attributable to polonium exposure have been confirmed.

- In response to concerns about the risks of occupational polonium exposure, quantities of ^{210}Po were administered to five human volunteers at the University of Rochester from 1944 to 1947, in order to study its biological behaviour. These studies were funded by the Manhattan Project and the AEC. Four men and a woman participated, all suffering from terminal cancers, and ranged in age from their early thirties to early forties; all were chosen because experimenters wanted subjects who had not been exposed to polonium either through work or accident. ^{210}Po was injected into four hospitalised patients, and orally given to a fifth. None of the administered doses (all ranging from 0.17 to 0.30 μCi kg^{−1}) approached fatal quantities.
- The first documented death directly resulting from polonium poisoning occurred in the Soviet Union, on 10 July 1954. An unidentified 41-year-old man presented for medical treatment on 29 June, with severe vomiting and fever; the previous day, he had been working for five hours in an area in which, unknown to him, a capsule containing ^{210}Po had depressurised and begun to disperse in aerosol form. Over this period, his total intake of airborne ^{210}Po was estimated at 0.11 GBq (almost 25 times the estimated LD_{50} by inhalation of 4.5 MBq). Despite treatment, his condition continued to worsen and he died 13 days after the exposure event.
- From 1955 to 1957 the Windscale Piles had been releasing polonium-210. The Windscale fire brought the need for testing of the land downwind for radioactive material contamination, and this is how it was found. An estimate of 8.8 terabecquerels (240 Ci) of polonium-210 has been made.
- It has also been suggested that Irène Joliot-Curie's 1956 death from leukaemia was owed to the radiation effects of polonium. She was accidentally exposed in 1946 when a sealed capsule of the element exploded on her laboratory bench.
- As well, several deaths in Israel during 1957–1969 have been alleged to have resulted from ^{210}Po exposure. A leak was discovered at a Weizmann Institute laboratory in 1957. Traces of ^{210}Po were found on the hands of Professor Dror Sadeh, a physicist who researched radioactive materials. Medical tests indicated no harm, but the tests did not include bone marrow. Sadeh, one of his students, and two colleagues died from various cancers over the subsequent few years. The issue was investigated secretly, but there was never any formal admission of a connection between the leak and the deaths.
- The Church Rock uranium mill spill 16 July 1979 is reported to have released polonium-210. The report states animals had higher concentrations of lead-210, polonium-210 and radium-226 than the tissues from control animals.
- The cause of the 2006 death of Alexander Litvinenko, a former Russian FSB agent who had defected to the United Kingdom in 2001, was identified to be poisoning with a lethal dose of ^{210}Po; it was subsequently determined that the ^{210}Po had probably been deliberately administered to him by two Russian ex-security agents, Andrey Lugovoy and Dmitry Kovtun. As such, Litvinenko's death was the first (and, to date, only) confirmed instance in which polonium's extreme toxicity has been used with malicious intent.
- In 2011, an allegation surfaced that the death of Palestinian leader Yasser Arafat, who died on 11 November 2004 of uncertain causes, also resulted from deliberate polonium poisoning, and in July 2012, concentrations of ^{210}Po many times more than normal were detected in Arafat's clothes and personal belongings by the Institut de Radiophysique in Lausanne, Switzerland. Even though Arafat's symptoms were acute gastroenteritis with diarrhoea and vomiting, the institute's spokesman said that despite the tests the symptoms described in Arafat's medical reports were not consistent with ^{210}Po poisoning, and conclusions could not be drawn. In 2013 the team found levels of polonium in Arafat's ribs and pelvis 18 to 36 times the average, even though by this point in time the amount had diminished by a factor of 2 million. Forensic scientist Dave Barclay stated, "In my opinion, it is absolutely certain that the cause of his illness was polonium poisoning. ... What we have got is the smoking gun - the thing that caused his illness and was given to him with malice." Subsequently, French and Russian teams claimed that the elevated ^{210}Po levels were not the result of deliberate poisoning, and did not cause Arafat's death.
- It has also been suspected that Russian businessman Roman Tsepov was killed with polonium. He had symptoms similar to Litvinenko's.

=== Treatment ===
It has been suggested that chelation agents, such as British anti-Lewisite (dimercaprol), can be used to decontaminate humans. In one experiment, rats were given a fatal dose of 1.45 MBq/kg (8.7 ng/kg) of ^{210}Po; all untreated rats were dead after 44 days, but 90% of the rats treated with the chelation agent HOEtTTC remained alive for five months.

=== Detection in biological specimens ===
Polonium-210 may be quantified in biological specimens by alpha particle spectrometry to confirm a diagnosis of poisoning in hospitalized patients or to provide evidence in a medicolegal death investigation. The baseline urinary excretion of polonium-210 in healthy persons due to routine exposure to environmental sources is normally in a range of 5–15 mBq/day. Levels in excess of 30 mBq/day are suggestive of excessive exposure to the radionuclide.

=== Occurrence in humans and the biosphere ===
Polonium-210 is widespread in the biosphere, including in human tissues, because of its position in the uranium-238 decay chain. Natural uranium-238 in the Earth's crust decays through a series of solid radioactive intermediates including radium-226 to the radioactive noble gas radon-222, some of which, during its 3.8-day half-life, diffuses into the atmosphere. There it decays through several more steps to polonium-210, much of which, during its 138-day half-life, is washed back down to the Earth's surface, thus entering the biosphere, before finally decaying to stable lead-206.

As early as the 1920s, French biologist Antoine Lacassagne, using polonium provided by his colleague Marie Curie, showed that the element has a specific pattern of uptake in rabbit tissues, with high concentrations, particularly in liver, kidney, and testes. More recent evidence suggests that this behavior results from polonium substituting for its congener sulfur, also in group 16 of the periodic table, in sulfur-containing amino-acids or related molecules and that similar patterns of distribution occur in human tissues. Polonium is indeed an element naturally present in all humans, contributing appreciably to natural background dose, with wide geographical and cultural variations, and particularly high levels in arctic residents, for example.

=== Tobacco ===
Polonium-210 in tobacco contributes to many of the cases of lung cancer worldwide. Most of this polonium is derived from lead-210 deposited on tobacco leaves from the atmosphere; the lead-210 is a product of radon-222 gas, much of which appears to originate from the decay of radium-226 from fertilizers applied to the tobacco soils.

The presence of polonium in tobacco smoke has been known since the early 1960s. Some of the world's biggest tobacco firms researched ways to remove the substance—to no avail—over a 40-year period. The results were never published.

=== Food ===
Polonium is found in the food chain, especially in seafood.

== See also ==
- Polonium halo
- List of chemical elements named after places

== Bibliography ==
- Bagnall, K. W. (1962) [1962]. "The Chemistry of Polonium". Advances in Inorganic Chemistry and Radiochemistry. Vol. 4. New York: Academic Press. pp. 197–226. doi:10.1016/S0065-2792(08)60268-X. ISBN 978-0-12-023604-6.
- Greenwood, Norman N.; Earnshaw, Alan (1997). Chemistry of the Elements (2nd ed.). Butterworth–Heinemann. ISBN 978-0080379418.
