= Calcium polonide =

Names
- Preferred IUPAC name Calcium polonide

Identifiers
CAS Number	51681-45-9
3D model (JSmol)	Interactive image
ChemSpider	129549187
- InChI: InChI=1S/Ca.Po/q+2;-2 Key: NWHIVWOERKOURT-UHFFFAOYSA-N
- SMILES: [Ca+2].[Po-2]

Properties
Chemical formula	CaPo
Molar mass	249 g·mol^{−1}
Density	6.0 g/cm^{3}

Structure
Crystal structure	Rock Salt (cubic)
Space group	Fm3̅m (No. 225)
Lattice constant	a = 0.6514 nm
- Except where otherwise noted, data are given for materials in their standard state (at 25 °C [77 °F], 100 kPa). Infobox references

Calcium polonide is an intermetallic compound with the chemical formula CaPo. It is made up of calcium and polonium. Rather than being found in nature, the compound is entirely synthetic, and difficult to study, due to polonium's high vapor pressure, radioactivity, and easy oxidation in air.

== Structure ==
At atmospheric pressure, it crystalizes in the cubic rock salt crystal structure. At a high pressure of around 16.7 GPa, the structure is predicted to transform to the caesium chloride-type crystal structure.

== Electronic properties ==
Based on theoretical calculations, calcium polonide is predicted to be a semiconductor.

== See also ==
- Magnesium polonide
- Potassium polonide
