= Polonium tetranitrate =

Names
- Other names Polonium tetranitrate

Identifiers
CAS Number	66256-55-1
3D model (JSmol)	Interactive image
ChemSpider	23352125
ECHA InfoCard	100.060.234
EC Number	266-278-2
PubChem CID	23638965
- InChI: InChI=1S/4NO3.Po/c4*2-1(3)4;/q4*-1; Key: QQOAUYKHHFTXBZ-UHFFFAOYSA-N
- SMILES: [N+](=O)([O-])[O-].[N+](=O)([O-])[O-].[N+](=O)([O-])[O-].[N+](=O)([O-])[O-].[Po]

Properties
Chemical formula	Po(NO_{3})_{4}
Molar mass	457.00 g/mol
Solubility in water	Soluble

Related compounds
Related compounds	Americium(III) nitrate
- Except where otherwise noted, data are given for materials in their standard state (at 25 °C [77 °F], 100 kPa). Infobox references

Polonium tetranitrate is an inorganic compound with the proposed formula Po(NO_{3})_{4}.

The neutral tetranitrate has been claimed by a single publication, but no proof of existence has been provided. Other basic polonium nitrates have also been proposed.

== Synthesis and properties ==
A single publication claims that polonium tetranitrate is produced by reacting polonium(IV) oxide and dinitrogen tetroxide.

Solutions of polonium nitrate prepared by the dissolution of polonium tetrachloride or polonium(IV) oxide in nitric acid slowly precipitate out an unknown basic nitrate that has been formulated as (PoO)_{2}(NO_{3})_{3}OH.
