= Polonium tetraiodide =

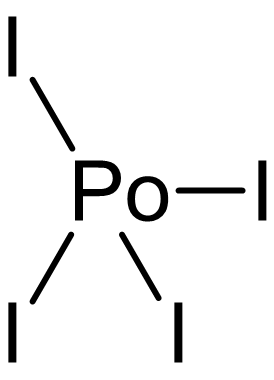

Names
- Other names Polonium(IV) iodide

Identifiers
CAS Number	61716-27-6
3D model (JSmol)	Interactive image
- InChI: InChI=1S/4HI.Po/h4*1H;/q;;;;+4/p-4 Key: DHKHYWWHNZXEQM-UHFFFAOYSA-J
- SMILES: I[Po](I)(I)I

Properties
Chemical formula	PoI_{4}
Molar mass	716.6 g/mol
Appearance	Black crystals
Melting point	200 °C (392 °F; 473 K)
Solubility in water	Insoluble

Related compounds
Related compounds	Chromium(III) sulfide
- Except where otherwise noted, data are given for materials in their standard state (at 25 °C [77 °F], 100 kPa). Infobox references

Polonium tetraiodide is a binary inorganic compound of polonium and iodine with the chemical formula PoI_{4}. The compound forms volatile black crystals.

== Synthesis ==
1. Action of iodine vapor on polonium metal:

Po + 2 I_{2} → PoI_{4}

2. Dissolution of polonium dioxide in hydroiodic acid:

PoO_{2} + 4 HI → PoI_{4} + 2 H_{2}O

== Properties ==
=== Physical properties ===
The compound forms black crystals that are insoluble in water.

=== Chemical properties ===
The compound reacts with hydroiodic acid to form hexaiodopolonic acid:

PoI_{4} + 2 HI → H_{2}[PoI_{6}]

It can be reduced by hydrogen sulfide to yield polonium metal. It decomposes on heating.
