= Lead carbide =

Hypothetical chemical compound of carbon and lead

Lead carbide is a hypothetical chemical compound of carbon and lead. Lead and elemental carbon do not normally combine, even at very high temperatures. Modern literature on lead carbide is almost non-existent.

== Production ==
J. F. Durand reported in 1923 the synthesis of lead carbide from calcium carbide CaC_{2} by treatment with an aqueous solution of lead(II) acetate Pb(CH_{3}CO_{2})_{2}, but this result was not reproduced.

A 2007 textbook repeats this claim, describing lead carbide as a green powder with formula PbC_{2} that is decomposed by hydrochloric acid HCl to acetylene C_{2}H_{2} and lead(II) chloride PbCl_{2}.

A compound analyzed as lead carbide PbC_{2} has also been obtained accidentally, as a thin layer (about 10 μm thick) on the inner wall of a graphite crucible that had been used to heat a lead-bismuth eutectic alloy for 100 hours at 1073 K in a helium atmosphere.

== Pyrophoric lead ==
Several reports of "lead carbide" synthesis appeared in the early 19th century, and were widely cited and copied into textbooks during the next few decades. In 1820, for instance, a certain John claimed to have sublimated a black carbide of lead from finely divided mixture of lead and charcoal, but this claim apparently was never reproduced. Also in 1820, Berzelius claimed that the pyrolysis (decomposition by heat) of iron-lead cyanide resulted in a double iron and lead carbide, FeC_{4}·2PbC_{4}. In 1823 Göbel from Jena obtained, by pyrolysis of lead tartrate in a closed vessel, a black powder that ignited spontaneously in contact with air, and believed it to be a carbide of lead. This product still provides a popular school demonstration of pyrophoricity. Shortly thereafter, Proust obtained a similar product from lead acetate and Berzelius obtained one from lead cyanide.

However, by 1870 those pyrophoric residues came to be regarded as an "intimate mixture" of carbon and lead; and the existence of lead carbide was considered unproven.
