= Higher sulfur oxides =

Group of chemical compounds

Higher sulfur oxides are a group of chemical compounds with the formula SO_{3+x} where x lies between 0 and 1. They contain peroxo (O−O) groups, and the oxidation state of sulfur is +6 as in SO_{3}.

Monomeric SO_{4} can be isolated at low temperatures (below 78 K) following the reaction of SO_{3} and atomic oxygen or photolysis of SO_{3}–ozone mixtures. The favoured structure is:

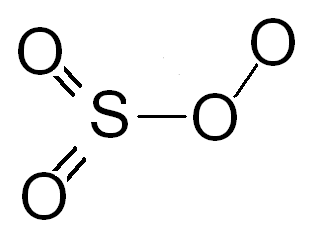

Colourless polymeric condensates are formed in the reaction of gaseous SO_{3} or SO_{2} with O_{2} in a silent electric discharge. The structure of the polymers is based on β-SO_{3} (one of the three forms of solid SO_{3}) with oxide bridges (−O−) replaced randomly by peroxide bridges (−O−O−). As such these compounds are non-stoichiometric.
