= Polonium tetrabromide =

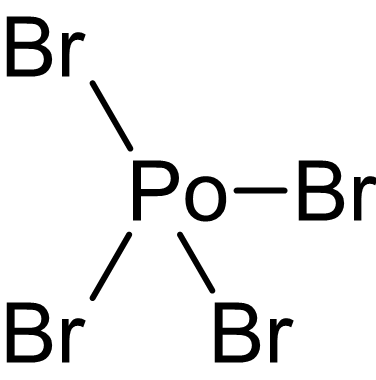

Identifiers
| CAS Number | 60996-98-7 |
| 3D model (JSmol) | Interactive image |
| PubChem CID | 154204552 |
- InChI: InChI=1S/4BrH.Po/h4*1H;/q;;;;+4/p-4 Key: MOAWHUMOOBCMOF-UHFFFAOYSA-J
- SMILES: Br[Po](Br)(Br)Br

Properties
| Chemical formula | Br_{4}Po |
| Molar mass | 529 g·mol^{−1} |
| Appearance | pale red solid |
| Solubility | soluble in ethanol soluble in bromine |

Structure
| Crystal structure | cubic crystal system |
| Space group | Fm3̅m (No. 225) |
| Lattice constant | a = 5.6 Å |

Related compounds
| Other anions | polonium tetrafluoride polonium tetrachloride polonium tetraiodide |
| Other cations | selenium tetrabromide tellurium tetrabromide |
| Related compounds | polonium tetrabromide |
- Except where otherwise noted, data are given for materials in their standard state (at 25 °C [77 °F], 100 kPa). Infobox references

Polonium tetrabromide, is a bromide of polonium, with the chemical formula PoBr_{4}.

== Preparation ==
Polonium tetrabromide can be formed by the direct reaction of bromine and polonium at 200 °C to 250 °C.

Like polonium tetraiodide, polonium tetrabromide can also be produced by the reaction of polonium dioxide and hydrogen bromide:

PoO_{2} + 4 HBr → PoBr_{4} + 2 H_{2}O

== Properties ==
Polonium tetrabromide is a light red solid that is easily deliquescent. It crystallizes in the cubic crystal system, with space group Fm3̅m (No. 225) and lattice parameter a = 5.6 Å.
