= Chromium(II) selenide =

Names
- IUPAC name Chromium(2+) selenide

Identifiers
CAS Number	12053-13-3
3D model (JSmol)	Interactive image
ChemSpider	57269572
ECHA InfoCard	100.031.805
EC Number	234-999-1
PubChem CID	82886
CompTox Dashboard (EPA)	DTXSID001014274
- InChI: InChI=1S/Cr.Se Key: UVZCKRKEVWSRGT-UHFFFAOYSA-N
- SMILES: [Cr]=[Se]

Properties
Chemical formula	CrSe
Molar mass	130.96 g/mol
Appearance	white to pale yellow crystalline powder
Density	6.74 g/cm^{3}
Melting point	~1500 °C
Solubility in water	insoluble

Structure
Crystal structure	NiAs type (hexagonal)
Space group	P6_{3}/mmc, No. 194
Lattice constant	a = 371 pm, c = 603 pm

Hazards
NFPA 704 (fire diamond)	1 1 1
- NIOSH (US health exposure limits)
PEL (Permissible)	TWA 1 mg/m^{3}
REL (Recommended)	TWA 0.5 mg/m^{3}
IDLH (Immediate danger)	250 mg/m^{3}
- Except where otherwise noted, data are given for materials in their standard state (at 25 °C [77 °F], 100 kPa). Infobox references

Chromium(II) selenide is an inorganic compound with the chemical formula CrSe. It crystalizes in a hexagonal structure with space group P6_{3}/mmc. It is one of many related chromium-selenium phases, including Cr_{2}Se_{3}, as well as Cr_{7}Se_{8}, Cr_{3}Se_{4}, Cr_{0.68}Se, and Cr_{5}Se_{8}. The compound has been described as an antiferromagnet, but its inverse magnetic susceptibility does not match the behavior expected for an antiferromagnet according to the Curie–Weiss law. One suggestion was that the Néel temperature is at 320 K, as the temperature where the compound has maximum specific heat. When synthesized as single atomic layer, CrSe is ferromagnetic, with a Curie Temperature of around 280 K.
