= Chromium(III) selenide =

Names
- IUPAC name Chromium(III) selenide
- Other names Dichromium triselenide

Identifiers
CAS Number	12053-36-0
3D model (JSmol)	Interactive image
ChemSpider	13785932
PubChem CID	19601284
- InChI: InChI=1S/2Cr.3Se/q2*+3;3*-2 Key: MFCZCFZRMCCMJL-UHFFFAOYSA-N
- SMILES: [Cr+3].[Cr+3].[Se-2].[Se-2].[Se-2]

Properties
Chemical formula	Cr_{2}Se_{3}
Molar mass	340.87 g/mol
Appearance	Maroon powder
Density	5.7–9.7 g/cm3
Solubility in water	insoluble

Related compounds
Other anions	Chromium(III) oxide Chromium(III) sulfide Chromium(III) telluride
- Except where otherwise noted, data are given for materials in their standard state (at 25 °C [77 °F], 100 kPa). Infobox references

Chromium(III) selenide is an inorganic chemical compound with the formula Cr_{2}Se_{3}. It is one of the several chromium-selenium phases, along with CrSe. It is formed as a maroon-colored amorphous powder, and has a rhombohedral crystal structure.

== Properties ==
Sheets of chromium(III) selenide were found to contain ferromagnetic properties, when below 70 K.
