= Polonium monoxide =

Names
- Systematic IUPAC name Polonium monoxide

Identifiers
3D model (JSmol)	Interactive image
ChemSpider	28689619
- InChI: InChI=1S/O.Po/q-2;+2
- SMILES: [Po+2].[O-2]

Properties
Chemical formula	PoO
Molar mass	224.98 g/mol
Appearance	brown solid
- Except where otherwise noted, data are given for materials in their standard state (at 25 °C [77 °F], 100 kPa). Infobox references

Polonium monoxide (also known as polonium(II) oxide) is a chemical compound with the formula PoO. It is one of three oxides of polonium, the other two being polonium dioxide (PoO_{2}) and polonium trioxide (PoO_{3}). It is an interchalcogen.

== Appearance and preparation ==
Polonium monoxide is a brown solid. It is formed during the radiolysis of polonium sulfite (PoSO_{3}) and polonium selenite (PoSeO_{3}).

== Chemistry ==
On contact with oxygen or water, both polonium monoxide and its related hydroxide (polonium(II) hydroxide, Po(OH)_{2}) are oxidized quickly to Po(IV).
