= Chromium(III) sulfide =

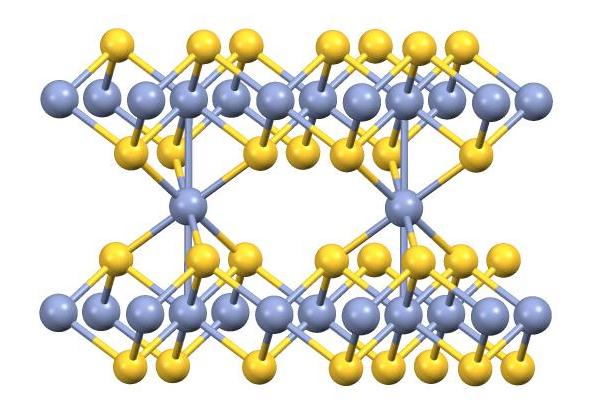

Identifiers
CAS Number	12018-22-3
3D model (JSmol)	Interactive image
ChemSpider	140177
ECHA InfoCard	100.031.477
EC Number	234-638-8
PubChem CID	159397
CompTox Dashboard (EPA)	DTXSID30893164
- InChI: InChI=1S/2Cr.3S/q2*+3;3*-2 Key: DBULDCSVZCUQIR-UHFFFAOYSA-N
- SMILES: [S-2].[S-2].[S-2].[Cr+3].[Cr+3]

Properties
Chemical formula	Cr_{2}S_{3}
Molar mass	200.19 g/mol
Appearance	Brown to black powder
Odor	odorless
Density	3.77 g/cm^{3}
Melting point	1350 °C
Solubility in water	insoluble
Magnetic susceptibility (χ)	+2390.0·10^{−6} cm^{3}/mol

Hazards
- GHS labelling
Pictograms	(GHS07: Exclamation mark)
Signal word	Warning
Hazard statements	H302, H317, H332
Precautionary statements	P261, P264, P270, P271, P272, P280, P301+P317, P302+P352, P304+P340, P317, P321, P330, P333+P317, P362+P364, P501
NFPA 704 (fire diamond)	1 0 0
- NIOSH (US health exposure limits)
PEL (Permissible)	TWA 1 mg/m^{3}
REL (Recommended)	TWA 0.5 mg/m^{3}
IDLH (Immediate danger)	250 mg/m^{3}
- Safety data sheet (SDS)

Related compounds
Other anions	Chromium(III) oxide Chromium(III) selenide Chromium(III) telluride
- Except where otherwise noted, data are given for materials in their standard state (at 25 °C [77 °F], 100 kPa). verify (what is ?) Infobox references

Chromium(III) sulfide is the inorganic compound with the formula Cr_{2}S_{3}. It is a brown-black solid. Chromium sulfides are usually nonstoichiometric compounds, with formulas ranging from CrS to Cr_{0.67}S (corresponding to Cr_{2}S_{3}).

== Preparation ==
Chromium(III) sulfide can be prepared through the reaction of a stoichiometric mixture of the elements at 1000 °C

2 Cr + 3 S → Cr_{2}S_{3}

It is a solid that is insoluble in water. According to X-ray crystallography, its structure is a combination of that of nickel arsenide (1:1 stoichiometry) and Cd(OH)_{2} (1:2 stoichiometry). Some metal-metal bonding is indicated by the short Cr-Cr distance of 2.78 Å.

== See also ==
- Brezinaite, a mineral with the formula Cr_{3}S_{4}
