= Polonium tetrachloride =

Names
- Systematic IUPAC name Polonium tetrachloride

Identifiers
CAS Number	10026-02-5
3D model (JSmol)	Interactive image
ChemSpider	4896024
PubChem CID	44146666
UNII	1K48QH7W29
CompTox Dashboard (EPA)	DTXSID10905310
- InChI: InChI=1S/4ClH.Po/h4*1H;/p-4 Key: GTPWZRGWXJYBBI-UHFFFAOYSA-J
- SMILES: [Cl-].[Cl-].[Cl-].[Cl-].[Po]

Properties
Chemical formula	PoCl_{4}
Molar mass	350.79 g/mol
Appearance	Bright yellow crystalline solid
Melting point	≈ 300 °C (in chlorine)
Boiling point	390 °C (734 °F; 663 K)
Solubility in water	soluble, but rather slow hydrolysis
Solubility	very soluble in hydrochloric acid and thionyl chloride, moderately soluble in ethanol and acetone, decomposes in dilute nitric acid

Related compounds
Other anions	Polonium tetrafluoride Polonium tetrabromide Polonium tetraiodide
Other cations	Selenium tetrachloride Tellurium tetrachloride
Related compounds	Polonium dichloride
- Except where otherwise noted, data are given for materials in their standard state (at 25 °C [77 °F], 100 kPa). Infobox references

Polonium tetrachloride (also known as polonium(IV) chloride) is a chemical compound with the formula PoCl_{4}. The salt is a hygroscopic bright yellow crystalline solid at room temperature. Above 200 °C, it tends to decompose into polonium dichloride and excess chlorine, similar to selenium tetrachloride and tellurium tetrachloride.

== Structure ==
Polonium tetrachloride is either monoclinic or triclinic.

== Appearance ==
Polonium tetrachloride is bright yellow at room temperature. At its melting point (300 °C), it becomes straw yellow, and at its boiling point (390 °C), it becomes scarlet. Its vapours are purple-brown until 500 °C, when they turn blue-green.

== Preparation ==
Polonium tetrachloride may be prepared by:

- halogenation of polonium dioxide with dry hydrogen chloride, gaseous thionyl chloride, or phosphorus pentachloride;
- dissolving of polonium metal in hydrochloric acid;
- heating polonium dioxide to 200 °C in carbon tetrachloride vapour;
- reaction of polonium metal with dry chlorine gas in 200 °C.

== Chemistry ==
Polonium tetrachloride forms a complex with two moles of tributyl phosphate.

Like selenium tetrachloride and tellurium tetrachloride, polonium tetrachloride forms PoCl^{−}_{5} and PoCl^{2−}_{6} halogen complexes.
