= Magnesium polonide =

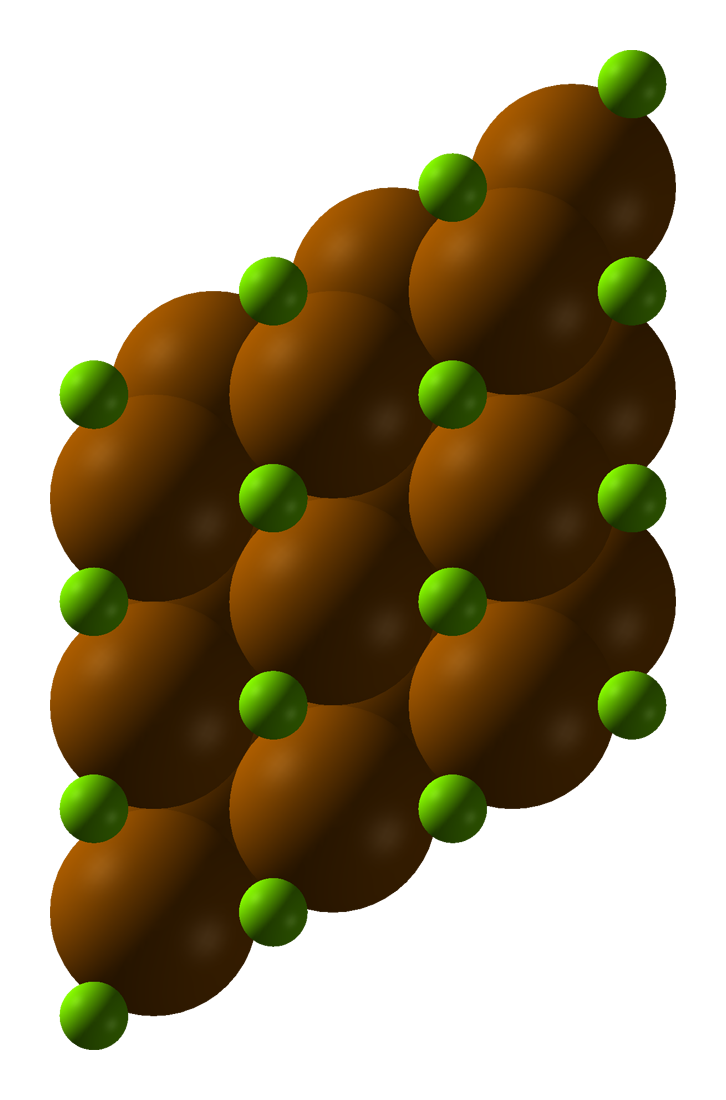

Names
- Preferred IUPAC name Magnesium polonide

Identifiers
CAS Number	66703-55-7
3D model (JSmol)	Interactive image
- InChI: InChI=1S/Mg.Po Key: BJTAGGSZNCQBON-UHFFFAOYSA-N
- SMILES: [Mg].[Po]

Properties
Chemical formula	MgPo
Molar mass	233.29 g/mol
Appearance	greyish
Density	6.7 g/cm^{3} (XRD)

Structure
Crystal structure	NiAs, hP4, No. 194
Space group	P6_{3}/mmc
Lattice constant	a = 0.4345 nm, b = 0.4345 nm, c = 0.7077 nm
Formula units (Z)	2
- Except where otherwise noted, data are given for materials in their standard state (at 25 °C [77 °F], 100 kPa). Infobox references

Magnesium polonide (MgPo) is a salt of magnesium and polonium. It is a polonide, a set of very chemically stable compounds of polonium.

== Preparation ==
Magnesium polonide can be produced by heating a mixture of elemental magnesium and polonium at 300–400 °C.

== Structure ==
Magnesium polonide has the nickeline (NiAs) structure. It is unusual among polonides in not being isomorphous with the corresponding sulfide, selenide and telluride; only mercury polonide (HgPo) shares this property.
