= Tellurium trioxide =

Names
- Other names tellurium(VI) oxide

Identifiers
| CAS Number | 13451-18-8 |
| 3D model (JSmol) | Interactive image |
| ChemSpider | 75319 |
| ECHA InfoCard | 100.033.277 |
| EC Number | 236-620-5 |
| PubChem CID | 83481 |
| UNII | GC5SXW83F8 |
| CompTox Dashboard (EPA) | DTXSID6065472 |
- InChI: InChI=1S/O3Te/c1-4(2)3 Key: IIXQANVWKBCLEB-UHFFFAOYSA-N; InChI=1/O3Te/c1-4(2)3 Key: IIXQANVWKBCLEB-UHFFFAOYAH
- SMILES: O=[Te](=O)=O

Properties
| Chemical formula | TeO_{3} |
| Molar mass | 175.6 g/mol |
| Appearance | yellow-orange crystals (α-TeO_{3}) |
| Density | 5.07 g/cm^{3}, solid |
| Melting point | 430 °C (806 °F; 703 K) |
- Except where otherwise noted, data are given for materials in their standard state (at 25 °C [77 °F], 100 kPa). verify (what is ?) Infobox references

Tellurium trioxide (TeO_{3}) is an inorganic chemical compound of tellurium and oxygen. In this compound, tellurium is in the +6 oxidation state.

== Polymorphs ==
There are two forms, yellow-red α-TeO_{3} and grey, rhombohedral, β-TeO_{3} which is less reactive.
α-TeO_{3} has a structure similar to FeF_{3} with octahedral TeO_{6} units that share all vertices.

== Preparation ==
α-TeO_{3} can be prepared by heating orthotelluric acid, Te(OH)_{6}, at over 300 °C. The β-TeO_{3} form can be prepared by heating α-TeO_{3} in a sealed tube with O_{2} and H_{2}SO_{4}.
α-TeO_{3} is unreactive to water but is a powerful oxidising agent when heated. With alkalis it forms tellurates.
α-TeO_{3} when heated loses oxygen to form firstly Te_{2}O_{5} and then TeO_{2}.
