= Tellurium dioxide =

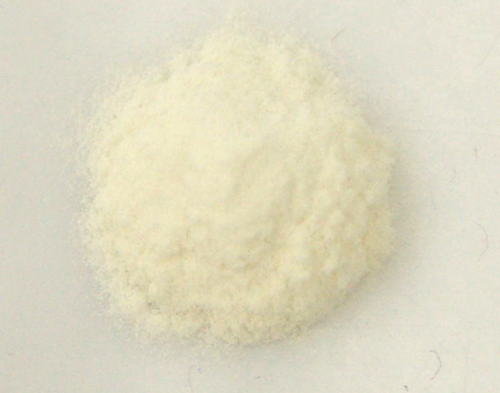

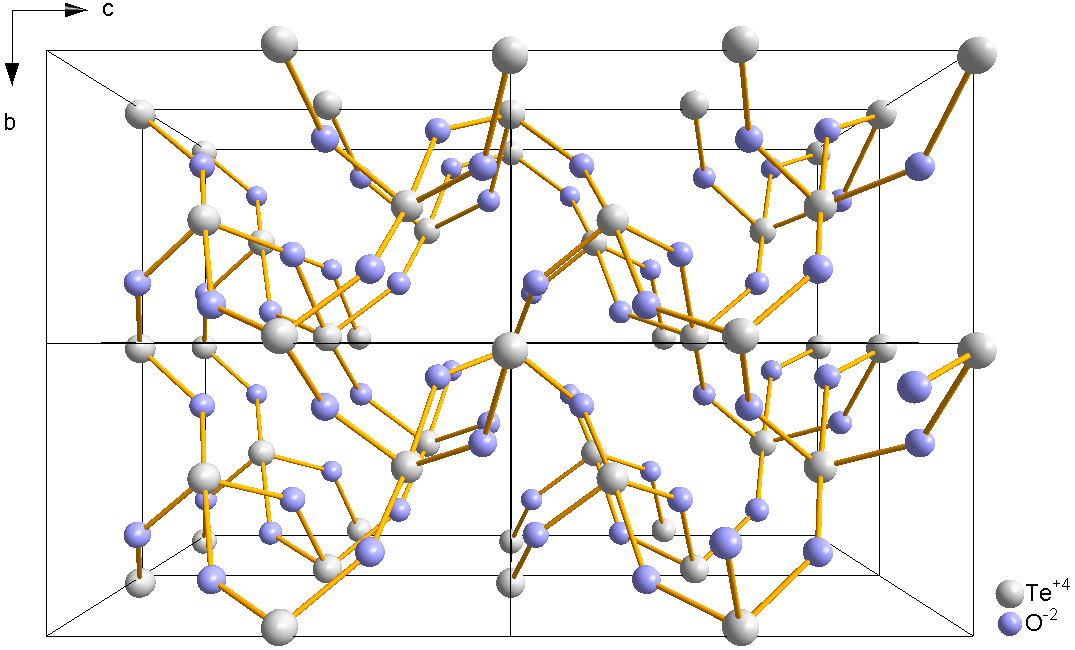
- α-TeO_{2}, paratellurite

Names
- Other names Tellurium(IV) oxide

Identifiers
CAS Number	7446-07-3
3D model (JSmol)	Interactive image
ChemSpider	56390
ECHA InfoCard	100.028.357
PubChem CID	62638
UNII	397E9RKE83
CompTox Dashboard (EPA)	DTXSID8052487
- InChI: InChI=1S/O2Te/c1-3-2 Key: LAJZODKXOMJMPK-UHFFFAOYSA-N; InChI=1/O2Te/c1-3-2 Key: LAJZODKXOMJMPK-UHFFFAOYAO
- SMILES: O=[Te]=O

Properties
Chemical formula	TeO_{2}
Molar mass	159.60 g/mol
Appearance	white solid
Density	5.670 g/cm^{3}(orthorhombic); 6.04 g/cm^{3} (tetragonal)
Melting point	732 °C (1,350 °F; 1,005 K)
Boiling point	1,245 °C (2,273 °F; 1,518 K)
Solubility in water	negligible
Solubility	soluble in acid and alkali
Refractive index (n_{D})	2.24

Hazards
Flash point	Non-flammable

Related compounds
Other cations	Sulfur dioxide Selenium dioxide
Related tellurium oxides	Tellurium trioxide Tellurium monoxide
- Except where otherwise noted, data are given for materials in their standard state (at 25 °C [77 °F], 100 kPa). verify (what is ?) Infobox references

Tellurium dioxide (TeO_{2}) is a solid oxide of tellurium. It is encountered in two different forms, the yellow orthorhombic mineral tellurite, β-TeO_{2}, and the synthetic, colourless tetragonal (paratellurite), α-TeO_{2}. Most of the information regarding reaction chemistry has been obtained in studies involving paratellurite, α-TeO_{2}.

== Preparation ==
Paratellurite, α-TeO_{2}, is produced by reacting tellurium with O_{2}:

Te + O_{2} → TeO_{2}

An alternative preparation is to dehydrate tellurous acid, H_{2}TeO_{3}, or to thermally decompose basic tellurium nitrate, Te_{2}O_{4}·HNO_{3}, above 400 °C.

== Physical properties ==
The longitudinal speed of sound in tellurium dioxide is 4,260 metres per second (14,000 ft/s) at around room temperature.

== Chemical properties ==
TeO_{2} is barely soluble in water and soluble in strong acids and alkali metal hydroxides. It is an amphoteric substance and therefore can act both as an acid or as a base depending on the solution it is in. It reacts with acids to make tellurium salts and bases to make tellurites. It can be oxidized to telluric acid or tellurates.

The tellurite ion is kinetically inert, but TeO_{2} equivalents will oxidize thioates in acid to the diacyl disulfide.

== Structure ==
Paratellurite, α-TeO_{2}, converts at high pressure into the β-, tellurite form. Both the α-, (paratellurite) and β- (tellurite forms) contain four coordinate Te with the oxygen atoms at four of the corners of a trigonal bipyramid. In paratellurite all vertices are shared to give a rutile-like structure, where the O-Te-O bond angle are 140°. α-TeO_{2} In tellurite pairs of trigonal pyramidal, TeO_{4} units, sharing an edge, share vertices to then form a layer. The shortest Te-Te distance in tellurite is 317 pm, compared to 374 pm in paratellurite. Similar Te_{2}O_{6} units are found in the mineral denningite.

TeO_{2} melts at 732.6 °C, forming a red liquid. The structure of the liquid, as well as the glass which can be formed from it with sufficiently rapid cooling, are also based on approximately four coordinate Te. However, compared to the crystalline forms, the liquid and glass appear to incorporate short-range disorder (a variety of coordination geometries) which marks TeO_{2} glass as distinct from the canonical single-oxide glass-formers such as SiO_{2}, which share the same short-range order with their parent liquids.

== Uses ==
It is used as an acousto-optic material.

Tellurium dioxide is also a reluctant glass former, it will form a glass under suitable cooling conditions, or with additions of a small molar fraction of a second compound such as an oxide or halide. TeO_{2} glasses have high refractive indices and transmit into the mid-infrared part of the electromagnetic spectrum, therefore they are of technological interest for optical waveguides. Tellurite glasses have also been shown to exhibit Raman gain up to 30 times that of silica, useful in optical fibre amplification.

== Safety ==
TeO_{2} is a possible teratogen.

Exposure to tellurium compounds produces a garlic-like odour on the breath, caused by the formation of diethyl telluride.
