= ADAS =

ADAS or Adas may refer to:

== Science and technology ==
- Advanced driver-assistance systems, electronic systems that aid a vehicle driver while driving
- Asiago-DLR Asteroid Survey, a former project to search for comets and asteroids
- Architecture Design and Assessment System, a former set of software programs
- AWOS Data Acquisition System, an FAA computer system used with automated airport weather stations

== Other uses ==
- Alcohol and Drug Abstinence Service (ADAS), formal name of Acorn Treatment and Housing
- ADAS (company), a UK-based environmental consultancy
- Australian Diver Accreditation Scheme, for occupational divers
- Adas Bank, a submerged bank off the west coast of India
- Michael Adas (born 1943), American historian
- Adas Juškevičius (born 1989), Lithuanian professional basketball player

== See also ==
- Adath Israel (disambiguation)
- Adath Jeshurun (disambiguation)
- Adath Shalom (disambiguation)
- Ada (disambiguation)
