= Acetil-KoA:taksan-10beta-ol O-acetiltransferaza =

Acetil-KoA:taksan-10beta-ol O-acetiltransferaza may refer to:

- 10-hydroxytaxane O-acetyltransferase, an enzyme
- 10-deacetylbaccatin III 10-O-acetyltransferase, an enzyme
