= Adath Jeshurun =

Adath Jeshurun (Hebrew: עדת ישורון "Congregation/Community of the Upright") may refer to the following Jewish synagogues:

== United States ==
- Adath Jeshurun Congregation, Minnetonka, Minnesota
- Kahal Adath Jeshurun (commonly known as the Eldridge Street Synagogue), Chinatown, Manhattan, New York
- Khal Adath Jeshurun, Washington Heights, Manhattan, New York
- Adath Yeshurun congregation of Aiken, South Carolina
- Kahal Adath Yeshurun, also known as the Kew Gardens Synagogue (colloquially "The Big Shul"); Kew Gardens, Queens, New York

== South Africa ==
- Adath Yeshurun (Johannesburg), Fairmount, Johannesburg

=== Former synagogues ===
- Congregation Adath Jeshurun, a former synagogue, now church, in Boston, Massachusetts
- Adath Jeshurun of Jassy Synagogue, a former synagogue, now residences for artists, in Lower East Side, Manhattan, New York

== See also ==
- Jeshurun
