= Milataxel =

Names
- IUPAC name (2α,5β,7β,10β,13α)-4-Acetoxy-13-{[(2R,3R)-3-(2-furyl)-2-hydroxy-3-({[(2-methyl-2-propanyl)oxy]carbonyl}amino)propanoyl]oxy}-1,10-dihydroxy-9-oxo-7-(propionyloxy)-5,20-epoxytax-11-en-2-yl benzoate

Identifiers
CAS Number	352425-37-7
3D model (JSmol)	Interactive image
ChemSpider	5293786
DrugBank	DB12334
PubChem CID	6918589
UNII	J41Q4S20GS
CompTox Dashboard (EPA)	DTXSID40870345
- InChI: InChI=1S/C44H55NO16/c1-10-29(47)58-27-19-28-43(21-56-28,60-23(3)46)34-36(59-37(51)24-15-12-11-13-16-24)44(54)20-26(22(2)30(41(44,7)8)32(48)35(50)42(27,34)9)57-38(52)33(49)31(25-17-14-18-55-25)45-39(53)61-40(4,5)6/h11-18,26-28,31-34,36,48-49,54H,10,19-21H2,1-9H3,(H,45,53)/t26-,27-,28+,31-,32+,33+,34-,36-,42+,43-,44+/m0/s1 Key: XIVMHSNIQAICTR-UQYHODNASA-N; InChI=1/C44H55NO16/c1-10-29(47)58-27-19-28-43(21-56-28,60-23(3)46)34-36(59-37(51)24-15-12-11-13-16-24)44(54)20-26(22(2)30(41(44,7)8)32(48)35(50)42(27,34)9)57-38(52)33(49)31(25-17-14-18-55-25)45-39(53)61-40(4,5)6/h11-18,26-28,31-34,36,48-49,54H,10,19-21H2,1-9H3,(H,45,53)/t26-,27-,28+,31-,32+,33+,34-,36-,42+,43-,44+/m0/s1 Key: XIVMHSNIQAICTR-UQYHODNABP
- SMILES: O=C(OC(C)(C)C)N[C@@H](c1occc1)[C@@H](O)C(=O)O[C@@H]4C(=C3/[C@@H](O)C(=O)[C@]6([C@H]([C@H](OC(=O)c2ccccc2)[C@@](O)(C3(C)C)C4)[C@@]5(OC(=O)C)[C@H](OC5)C[C@@H]6OC(=O)CC)C)/C

Properties
Chemical formula	C_{44}H_{55}NO_{16}
Molar mass	853.905
- Except where otherwise noted, data are given for materials in their standard state (at 25 °C [77 °F], 100 kPa). Infobox references

Milataxel (MAC-321, TL-139) is a taxol analog.
