= Adath Israel =

Adath Israel or Adas Israel (Hebrew: עדת ישראל "Congregation/Community of Israel") may refer to the following Jewish synagogues:

== Canada ==
- Adath Israel (Montreal), Orthodox synagogue
- Adath Israel Congregation (Toronto), Conservative synagogue

== United States ==
- Adath Israel Brith Sholom, a synagogue in Louisville, Kentucky
- Adath Israel, a synagogue in Owensboro, Kentucky
- Temple Israel, originally named Adath Israel, a synagogue in Boston, Massachusetts
- Adath Israel, a synagogue in Cleveland, Mississippi, listed on the NRHP
- Adath Israel of Riverdale, a synagogue in the Bronx, New York
- Adas Israel, a synagogue in Sag Harbor, Long Island, New York
- Temple Adath Israel of the Main Line, a synagogue in Merion, Pennsylvania
- Adas Israel, a synagogue in Brownsville, Tennessee, an historic synagogue
- Adath Israel, commonly known as the Rutland Jewish Center, a synagogue in Rutland, Virginia
- Adas Israel, a synagogue in Washington, D.C.
- Adath Israel Congregation, Amberley, Ohio

=== Former synagogue buildings ===
- Adath Israel, a former synagogue in Louisville, Kentucky, listed on the NRHP
- Adas Israel, a former synagogue in Duluth, Minnesota
- Lillian & Albert Small Capital Jewish Museum, a former synagogue now museum in Washington, D.C., formerly known as Adas Israel Synagogue
- Adath Israel, a former synagogue in Woodbridge, New Jersey
