= Ward 72 (Johannesburg) =

Ward of Johannesburg, South Africa

- Interactive map of Ward 72 (Johannesburg)

Government
  - Ward councillor: Daniel Schay (Democratic Alliance)

Population (2011)
  - Total: 18 387
- Registered voters (2016) 16 133

Ward 72 is a ward within Johannesburg, South Africa, comprising the suburbs of Sunningdale, Glenhazel, Sandringham, Sydenham, Linksfield and Fairmount. The ward was established as of 2000.

== List of members representing the ward ==
Member	Years served	Party
SLS (Shirley) Ancer	5 December 2000 - 18 May 2011	Democratic Alliance
Steven Kruger	18 May 2011- 24 December 2017	Democratic Alliance
Lionel Mervin Greenberg	25 April 2018 - 8 October 2021	Democratic Alliance
Daniel Schay	8 October 2021 - present	Democratic Alliance

== List of election results ==
Election	DA	ANC	ACTIONSA	EFF	VF PLUS	ACDP	IFP	CMOSA	GOOD	UIM	ATM	UDM	COPE	POA	AASA	AIC	RLP	OHM	DSPT	DAP	AHC	APC	IRC	ASC	PA	PAC	ANA	AZAPO	CHANGE	COMMUNITY SOLIDARITY ASSOCIATIION	SHOSH	AMSA	DOP	JEP	SARKO	US	ABC	ARA	AGANG SA	APSP	UBUNTU	TA	ALJAMA	NFP	CDP	CF	ACA	SAPCO	BCP	OKM	SOPA	URF	ID	UIF	NADECO	EFM	GEMINI	GPGP	WP
LGE 2021	73.59%	9.4%	9.27%	1.98%	1.44%	0.88%	0.53%	0.5%	0.37%	0.33%	0.23%	0.22%	0.2%	0.19%	0.14%	0.09%	0.08%	0.07%	0.07%	0.07%	0.06%	0.05%	0.03%	0.03%	0.03%	0.02%	0.02%	0.02%	0.02%	0.02%	0.01%	0.01%	0.01%	0.01%	0.01%	0.01%	0.01%	0.01%	0.01%	-	-	-	-	-	-	-	-	-	-	-	-	-	-	-	-	-	-	-	-
BY-ELECTION 2018	92.45%	6.94%	-	0.61%	-	-	-	-	-	-	-	-	-	-	-	-	-	-	-	-	-	-	-	-	-	-	-	-	-	-	-	-	-	-	-	-	-	-	-	-	-	-	-	-	-	-	-	-	-	-	-	-	-	-	-	-	-	-	-
LGE 2016	82.48%	12.18%	-	3.15%	0.14%	0.33%	0.32%	-	-	-	-	0.11%	0.16%	-	-	0.68%	-	-	-	-	-	0.17%	-	-	0.08%	0.01%	-	0.08%	-	-	-	-	-	-	-	-	-	-	-	0.08%	0.02%	0.01%	0.01%	-	-	-	-	-	-	-	-	-	-	-	-	-	-	-	-
LGE 2011	78.99%	18.73%	-	-	0.08%	0.11%	0.39%	-	-	-	-	0.12%	0.77%	-	-	-	-	-	-	-	-	0.2%	-	-	-	0.1%	-	0.01%	-	-	-	-	-	-	-	-	-	-	-	-	-	-	0.03%	0.24%	0.1%	0.05%	0.04%	0.02%	0.01%	0.01%	0.01%	0.01%	-	-	-	-	-	-	-
LGE 2006	74.53%	22.16%	-	-	0.15%	0.42%	1.02%	-	-	-	-	0.16%	-	-	-	-	-	-	-	-	-	-	-	-	-	0.04%	-	0.1%	-	-	-	-	-	-	-	-	-	-	-	-	-	-	-	-	0.08%	0.08%	-	-	-	0.01%	-	-	1.18%	0.04%	0.02%	0.01%	0.01%	-	-
LGE 2000	76.05%	20.53%	-	-	0.27%	0.27%	1.87%					0.24%														0.1%		0.04%																	0.13%												0.02%	0.41%	0.07%
