= Mansukh C. Wani =

American medicinal chemist (1925–2020)

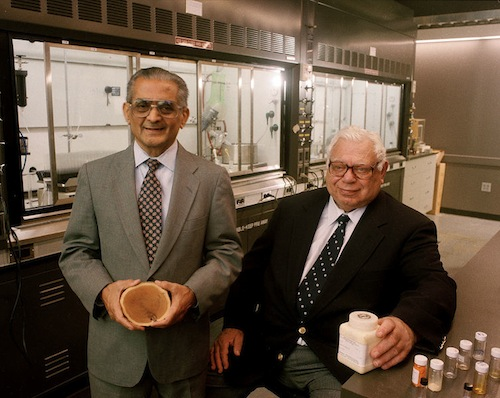
- Monroe Eliot Wall and Mansukh Wani (Left)
- Education: University of Bombay (Bachelor's, Master's); Indiana University Bloomington (PhD)
- Occupation: Medicinal chemist

Mansukh C. Wani, (died 2020), was a principal scientist (emeritus) at the Research Triangle Institute in North Carolina. He was co-discoverer of Taxol and camptothecin, two anti-cancer drugs considered standard in the treatment to fight ovarian, breast, lung and colon cancers. In 2000, Wani received an award for applied research in medicine, the Charles F. Kettering Prize, from the General Motors Cancer Research Foundation.

Wani was born in Nandurbar, Maharashtra, India. He attended the University of Bombay, receiving a bachelor's degree in 1947 (in chemistry) and a master's in 1950 (in organic chemistry). He moved to the United States in 1958, and received his PhD from Indiana University Bloomington in 1962, when he joined Research Triangle Institute. He used to live in Durham, North Carolina. He died on 11 April 2020.

== Awards ==
- Charles F Kettering Prize for major contributions to cancer research
- 'Magic Bullet' Lifetime Achievement Award
- Medicinal Chemistry Hall of Fame
