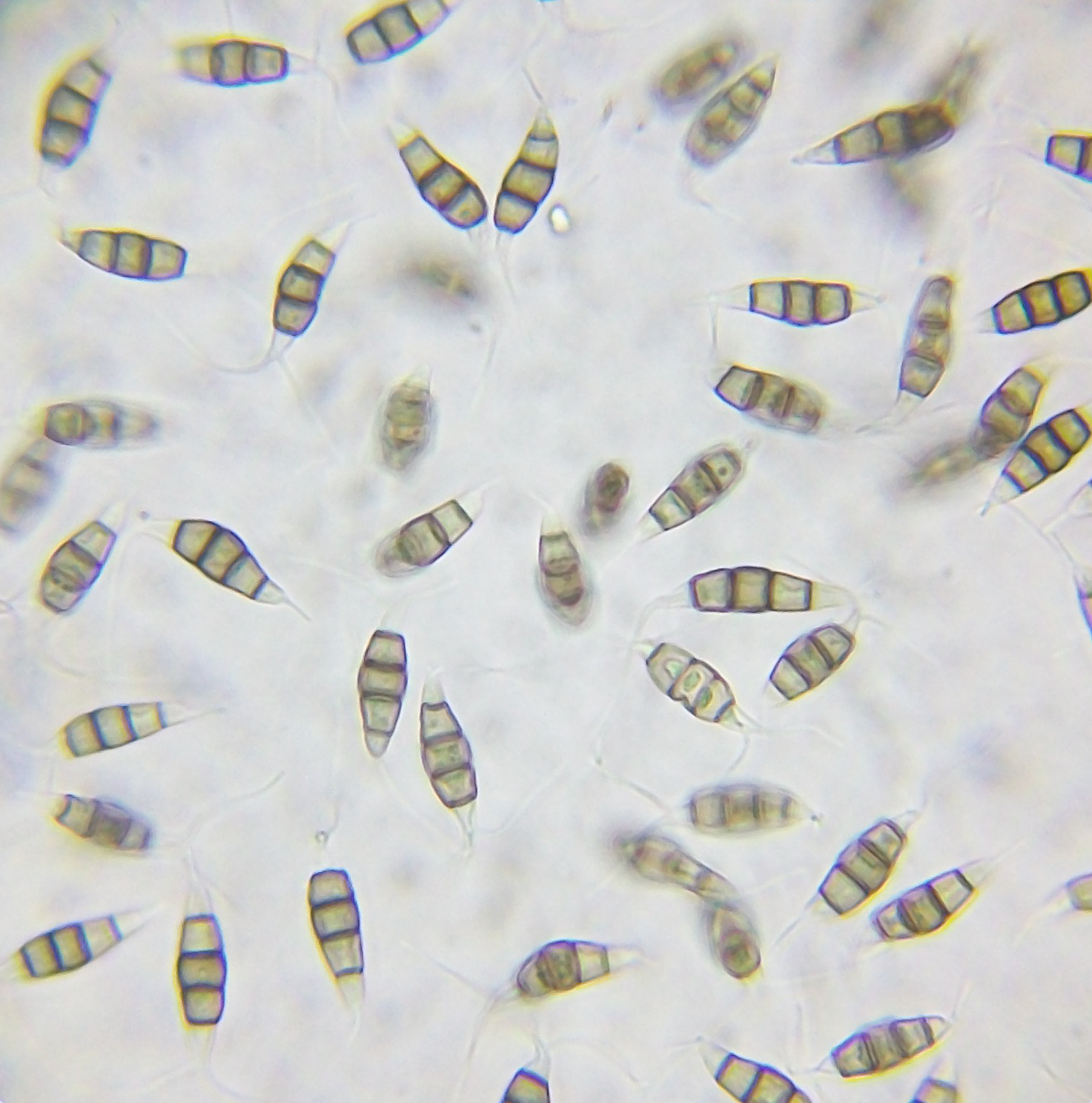

Scientific classification
- Kingdom: Fungi
- Division: Ascomycota
- Class: Sordariomycetes
- Order: Amphisphaeriales
- Family: Sporocadaceae
- Genus: Pestalotiopsis
- Species: P. pauciseta

Binomial name
- Pestalotiopsis pauciseta (Sacc.) Y.X. Chen

Synonyms
- Pestalotia pauciseta Sacc.

= Pestalotiopsis pauciseta =

Endophytic fungi

Pestalotiopsis pauciseta is an endophytic fungi isolated from the leaves of several medicinal plants in tropical climates. Pestalotiopsis pauciseta is known for its role in medical mycology, having the ability to produce a chemical compound called paclitaxel (taxol). Taxol is the first billion-dollar anticancer drug, notably the fungal-taxol produced by Pestalotiopsis pauciseta was determined to be comparable to standard taxol.

== Taxonomy ==
Pestalotiopsis pauciseta was initially described by Pier Andrea Saccardo as Pestalotia pauciseta in 1914, and was later changed to the genus Pestalotiopsis by authors Chen, Y.X.; Wei, G. in 1993.

== Description ==
Pestalotiopsis pauciseta has amphigenous pustules, which can range from globose to lenticular in shape, usually black, scattered and hemispherical (80-200μm). Conidiomata are eustromatic, cupulate, can be found separated or confluent, and are initially dark brown in color when immersed. After immersion, conidiomata are erumpent, thick walled, and irregularly dehisce.

== Habitat/distribution ==
Many species of Pestalotiopsis are saprobes in soil, degraders of plant matter, or organisms growing upon rotting wild fruits. Others are plant pathogens or occupy plant leaves and twigs as endophytes. Species of Pestalotiopsis have been repeatedly isolated as saprobes from dead leaves, bark, and twigs. Species have been isolated from polluted stream water and are associated with the deterioration of wood, paper, fabrics, and decay of wool. The genus Pestalotiopsis are known as plant pathogens; P. pauciseta isolated as endophytes, likely has endophytic and pathogenic stages.

== Bioactivity ==
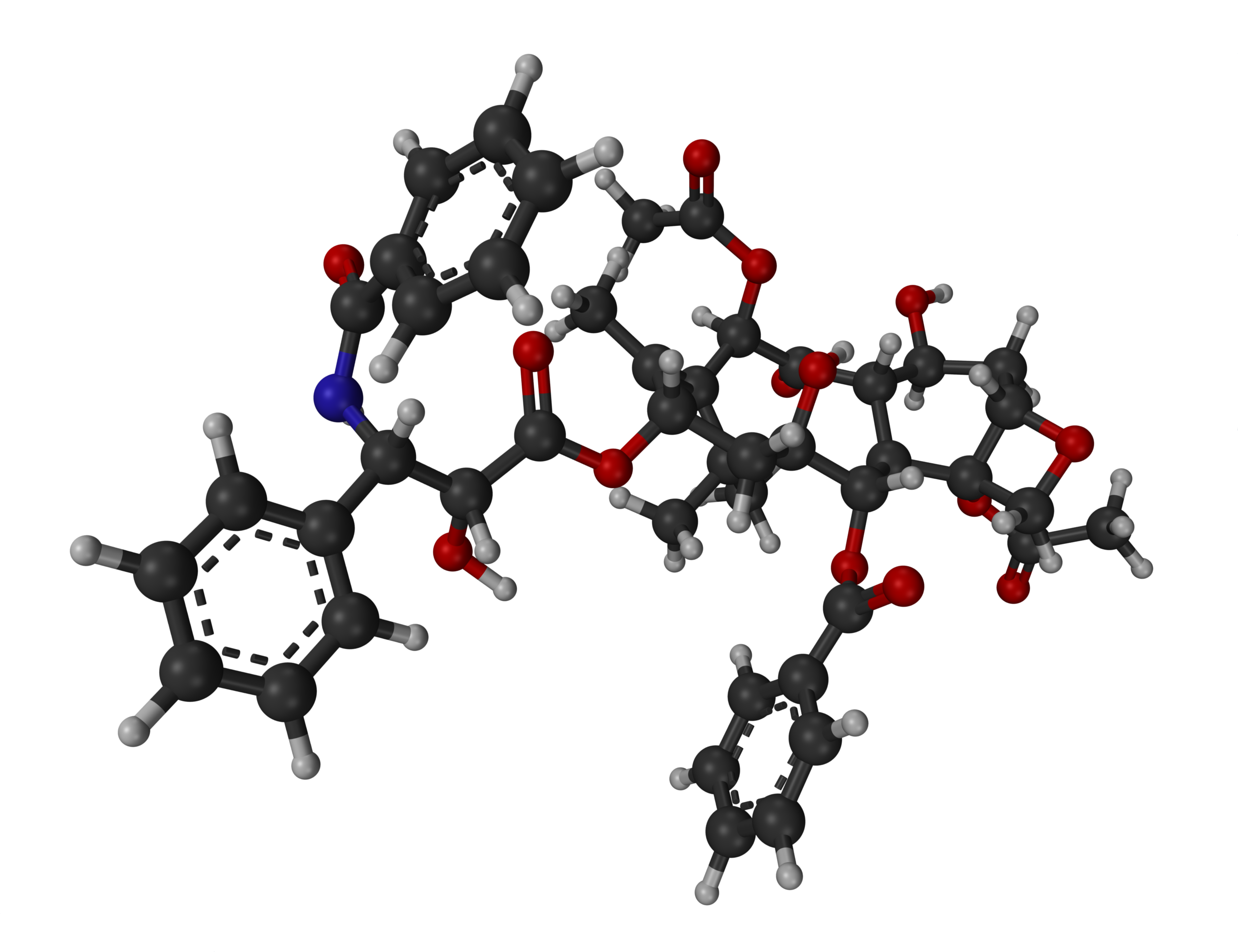
Taxol chemical structure

Fungal-taxol is an anticancer compound that has been developed into a medication used to treat ovarian, lung, breast, and head and neck cancers. The UV absorption spectrum of taxol isolated from Pestalotiopsis pauciseta VM1 was similar to that of standard taxol with maximum absorption at 235 nm and 232 nm.

More than 130 unique compounds have been isolated from various species of Pestalotiopsis. Antifungal, anticancer, antimicrobial, and antitumor activities are some of the most significant bioactivities of secondary metabolites isolated from this genus. It is suspected that P. pauciseta is one of many fungal plant endophytes that has the ability to produce bioactive compounds that are originally from their host plant.
