= Adath Shalom =

Adath Shalom (Hebrew: עדת שלום "Congregation/Community of Peace") may refer to the following Jewish synagogues:

- Adath Shalom Synagogue, in Paris, France
- Adath Shalom (Ottawa), in Ottawa, Canada
- Adath Shalom (Philadelphia), in Philadelphia, United States
