= RTI International =

American nonprofit organization

- Founded: 1958; 68 years ago
- Type: 501(c)(3) organization
- Tax ID no.: 56-0686338
- Headquarters: Research Triangle Park, North Carolina
- Location: United States
- Coordinates: 35°54′9.95″N 78°51′58.26″W
- Region served: Worldwide
- Key people: Tim J. Gabel (President/Chief Executive Officer)
- Revenue: $1.2 billion (USD) (2023)
- Employees: 5,956 (2023)
- Website: www.rti.org

Research Triangle Institute, operating as RTI International, is a nonprofit organization headquartered in Research Triangle Park in North Carolina, United States. RTI provides research and technical services. It was founded in 1958 with $500,000 in funding from local businesses and the three North Carolina universities that form the Research Triangle. RTI research has covered topics like HIV/AIDS, healthcare, education curriculum and the environment.

== History ==
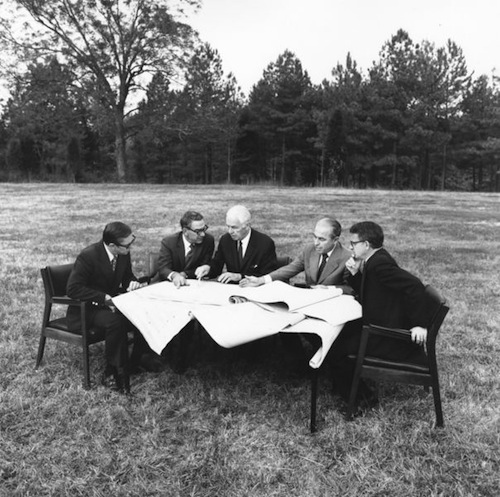
Planning of the Research Triangle Park

In 1954, a building contractor met with the North Carolina state treasurer and the president of Wachovia to discuss building a research park in North Carolina to attract new industries to the region. They obtained support for the concept from the state governor, Luther Hodges, and the three universities that form the research triangle: University of North Carolina at Chapel Hill, Duke University and North Carolina State University. The Research Triangle Institute (now RTI International) was formed by the park's founders as the research park's first tenant in 1958. The following January, they announced that $1.425 million had been raised by the Research Triangle Foundation to fund the park and that $500,000 of it had been set aside for RTI International.

RTI started with three divisions: Isotope Development, Operational Sciences and Statistics Research. Its first contract was a $4,500 statistical study of morbidity data from Tennessee. In RTI's first year of operation, it had 25 staff and $240,000 in research contracts. Its early work was focused on statistics, but within a few years RTI expanded into radioisotopes, organic chemistry and polymers. In 1960, the institute had its first international research contract for an agricultural census in Nigeria. RTI won contracts with the Department of Education, Defense Department, NASA and the Atomic Energy Commission, growing to $3.4 million in contracts in 1964 and $85 million in 1988.

In 1971, RTI's staff of 430 was reorganized into four research groups: social and economic systems, statistical sciences, environmental sciences and engineering, and chemistry and life sciences. It also created a division for education called the Center for Education Research and Evaluation. Four years later, RTI created the Office for International Programs to manage international projects. RTI provided funding assistance to help found the North Carolina School of Science and Mathematics in 1980. Two years later, it was part of a joint venture to create Microelectronics Center of North Carolina (MCNC), a non-profit whose computer network connected local K-12 schools.

RTI has had five presidents:

1. George R. Herbert 1958 - 1988
2. Thomas Wooten 1988 - 1998
3. Victoria Franchetti Haynes 1998 - 2012
4. Wayne Holden 2012 - 2022
5. Tim J. Gabel 2022–Present

== Organization ==
RTI International is a non-profit research organization. It was initially established by three local universities but it is managed by a separate board and management team. RTI's structure consists of members of the corporation, the board of governors and corporate officers. The members of the corporation elect governors, who in turn create the organization's policies.

RTI also has a separate business called RTI Health Solutions, which supports biotech, diagnostic and medical device companies. In 2012, the organization's largest service areas were in social, statistical and environmental sciences. More than half of RTI's staff have advanced degrees in one of 120 fields and work on approximately 1,200 projects at a time.

== Projects ==
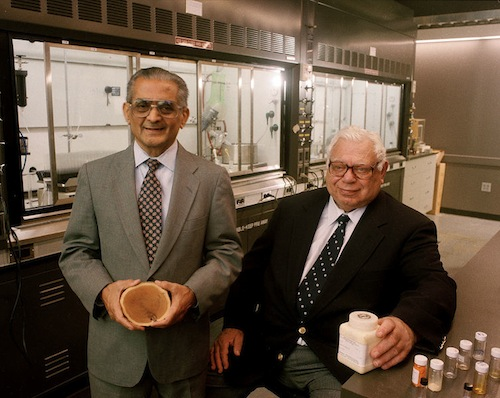
Wani (left) and Wall (right) holding a piece of tree bark used to synthesize cancer intervention drugs

RTI International's research has spanned areas like cancer, pollution, semiconductor materials research such as diamond and thermoelectric materials, drug abuse and education. It manages the National Laboratory Certification Program (NLCP).

RTI scientists Monroe Wall and Mansukh C. Wani synthesized the anti-cancer treatments camptothecin in 1966, from the bark of the Camptotheca tree, and Taxol in 1971, from a Pacific yew tree. These two drugs account for $3 billion a year in sales by pharmaceutical companies. In 1986, RTI was awarded a $4 million contract with the National Cancer Institute to conduct an eight-year clinical trial on the effects of an anti-smoking campaign. Two years later, RTI began a $4.4 million program to co-ordinate AIDS drug trials for the National Institutes of Health. This grew to $26 million by 1988.

RTI scientists helped to identify toxic chemicals in the Love Canal in the 1970s. In 1978, RTI researched the possibility of improving solar cells for the US Department of Energy and coal gasification for the Environmental Protection Agency in 1979. RTI trained Chinese government employees on using computer models to forecast pollution patterns before the 2008 Olympics in Beijing.

An RTI survey in 1973, commissioned by the Bureau of Narcotics and Dangerous Drugs, confirmed earlier research that found no connection between drug use and violent crime, despite perceptions of heroin users as more prone to violence. A 1975 study that RTI conducted for the National Institute of Alcohol Abuse and Alcoholism found that 28 percent of 13,000 teenagers polled were "problem drinkers", despite their age. A 1996 study by RTI and funded by the Pentagon found that drug abuse in the military had been reduced by 90 percent since 1980.

In 1975, RTI recommended that the Bureau of the Mint halt expensive production of cents and replace half-dollars with a new dollar coin.

In 2001, RTI team led by Rama Venkatasubramanian created a new thin-film superlattice material based on nanoscale engineering for improved thermoelectric effect. This invention won the first R&D 100 Award for RTI International in 2002. In 2009, Venkatasubramanian teaming with Intel Corp. demonstrated thin-film thermoelectric cooling for hot-spots in microprocessors.

A 2009 study by RTI and the Centers for Disease Control and Prevention published in Health Affairs estimated that obesity in the US caused $147 billion in increased medical care costs annually. RTI also developed a reading skill measurement program, the Early Grade Reading Assessment (EGRA), for the U.S. Agency for International Development (USAID) and the World Bank. The EGRA has been used in 70 languages and 50 countries.

In the 1980s, RTI created and distributed the Architecture Design and Assessment System, a set of software programs that helped model intricate systems. The ADAS programs were produced until the mid-1990s.

RTI began working for USAID after the conflict between Iraq and the US began in 2003. USAID work represented 35 percent of RTI's revenue by 2010. Under Iraq's previous, highly centralized regime, citizens had almost no experience with local governance or active participation in the governing process. To inform and train Iraqis in local governance systems, RTI ultimately set up offices in Iraq's 18 provinces. A staff of 200 people drawn from 33 countries, augmented by the hiring of 800 Iraqis, was deployed.

In 2004, Nextreme was spun off from RTI to commercialize the thin-film thermoelectric materials and devices for semiconductor applications. In October 2018, RTI published a study showing that heroin users who used fentanyl testing strips were more likely to adopt safer drug habits.

== RTI Press ==
RTI International funds RTI Press as a means of sharing multidisciplinary research and practical knowledge to reach a general audience. Since the late 2000's, RTI Press has published peer-reviewed, open-access research briefs (ISSN 2378-7929), policy briefs (ISSN 2378-7937), research reports (ISSN 2378-7902), methods report (ISSN 2378-7813), occasional papers (ISSN 2378-7996), conference proceedings (ISSN 2690-0343), and monographs and books, including the Essential Role of Language in Survey Research edited by Tim J. Gabel and Mandy Sha.
