= Monroe Eliot Wall =

American chemist

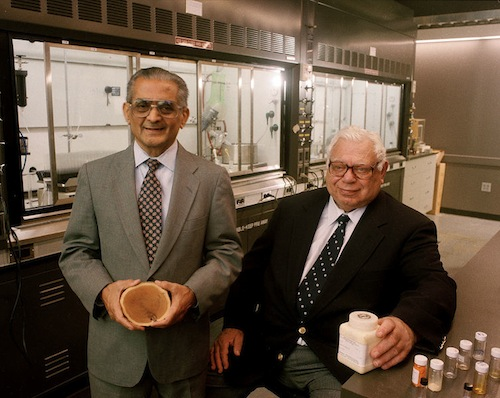
- Monroe Wall (right) and Mansukh C. Wani
- Born: 1916; Newark, New Jersey
- Died: July 6, 2002 (aged 85–86); Chapel Hill, North Carolina
- Education: Rutgers University (BS, MS, PhD)
- Occupation: Chemist
- Employer(s): USDA; Research Triangle Institute

Monroe Eliot Wall (1916 – July 6, 2002) was an American chemist, who co-discovered, with Mansukh C. Wani, paclitaxel and camptothecin, two anti-cancer drugs considered standard in the treatment to fight ovarian, breast, lung and colon cancers. On May 27, 1987, Wall received an honorary doctorate from the faculty of pharmacy at Uppsala University, Sweden.

Wall was born in Newark, New Jersey, in 1916. He completed his BS, MS, and PhD at Rutgers University. He joined the United States Department of Agriculture (USDA) in 1941 and worked at the USDA until 1960. That year, he started a research group at RTI International, where he remained for the duration of his career.
