= Sunningdale, Gauteng =

Sunningdale
- Location within Gauteng Location within South Africa
- Coordinates: 26°8′12″S 28°6′30″E
- Country: South Africa
- Province: Gauteng
- Municipality: City of Johannesburg
- Time zone: UTC+2 (SAST)
- Postal code (street): 2192
- PO box: 4019

Sunningdale is a suburb of Johannesburg, South Africa. It is located in Region E and Ward 72 of the City of Johannesburg Metropolitan Municipality.
