= Baccatin III =

Names
- IUPAC name (2β,5α,7α,10α,13β)-4,10-Diacetoxy-1,7,13-trihydroxy-9-oxo-5,20-epoxytax-11-en-2-yl benzoate

Identifiers
CAS Number	27548-93-2
3D model (JSmol)	Interactive image
ChEBI	CHEBI:32898
ChEMBL	ChEMBL288043
ChemSpider	23486966
ECHA InfoCard	100.164.451
EC Number	636-675-9
KEGG	C11900
PubChem CID	65366
UNII	40K5PZ0K67
CompTox Dashboard (EPA)	DTXSID301029474
- InChI: InChI=1S/C31H38O11/c1-15-19(34)13-31(38)26(41-27(37)18-10-8-7-9-11-18)24-29(6,20(35)12-21-30(24,14-39-21)42-17(3)33)25(36)23(40-16(2)32)22(15)28(31,4)5/h7-11,19-21,23-24,26,34-35,38H,12-14H2,1-6H3/t19-,20-,21+,23+,24-,26-,29+,30-,31+/m0/s1 Key: OVMSOCFBDVBLFW-VHLOTGQHSA-N
- SMILES: CC1=C2[C@@H](C(=O)[C@@]3([C@@H](C[C@H]4[C@]([C@H]3[C@H]([C@@](C2(C)C)(C[C@H]1O)O)OC(=O)c5ccccc5)(CO4)OC(=O)C)O)C)OC(=O)C

Properties
Chemical formula	C_{31}H_{38}O_{11}
Molar mass	586.62677 Da
Melting point	229 to 234 °C (444 to 453 °F; 502 to 507 K)
Acidity (pK_{a})	12.76
- Except where otherwise noted, data are given for materials in their standard state (at 25 °C [77 °F], 100 kPa). Infobox references

Baccatin III is an isolate from the yew tree (Genera Taxus). Baccatin III is a precursor to the anti-cancer drug paclitaxel (Taxol).

In 2014, researchers reported introduction and expression of the endophytic fungal gene responsible for synthesizing baccatin III (10-deacetylbaccatin III 10-O-acetyltransferase), to the mushroom Flammulina velutipes. Researchers achieved the same accomplishment with Escherichia coli in 2000.

== See also ==
- 10-Deacetylbaccatin
- Taxadiene
