= Rutland Jewish Center =

Unaffiliated historic synagogue in Rutland, Vermont, US

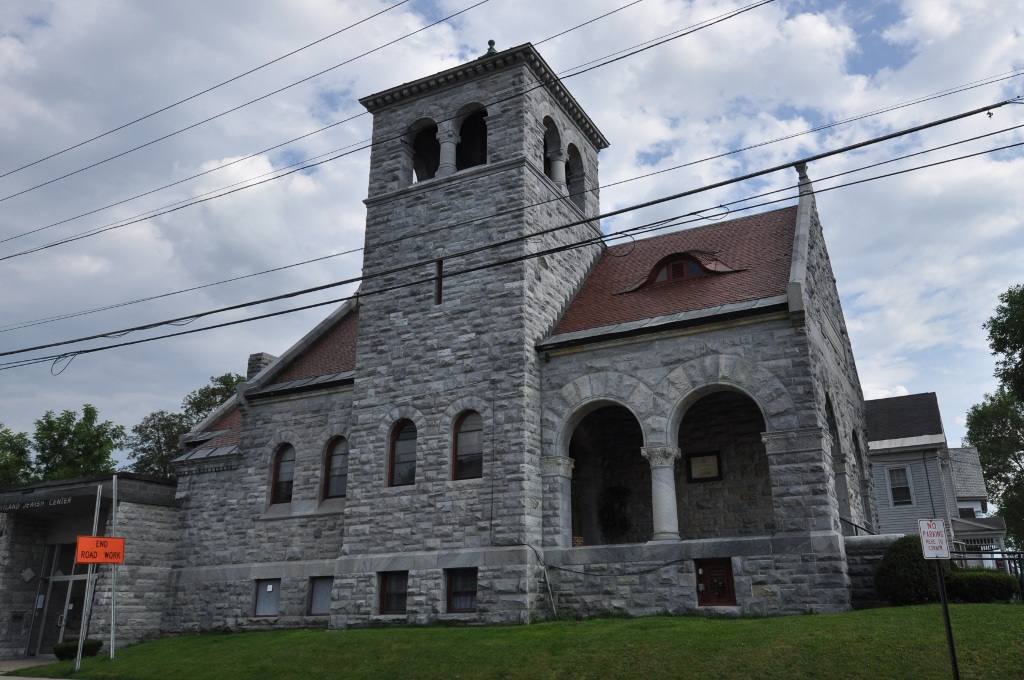

- Location in Vermont

Religion
- Affiliation: Judaism
- Rite: Non-denominational
- Ecclesiastical or organizational status: Synagogue
- Ownership: Congregation Adath Israel
- Leadership: Rabbi Ellie Shemtov
- Status: Active

Location
- Location: 96 Grove Street, Rutland, Vermont
- Country: United States
- Interactive map of Rutland Jewish Center
- Coordinates: 43°36′44″N 72°58′53″W

Architecture
- Architects: Brunner & Tryon
- Type: Library
- Style: Richardsonian Romanesque
- Established: 1911 (as a congregation)
- Completed: 1927 (acquired the Baxter building)
- Construction cost: $12,500 (purchase price)
- Materials: Marble

Website
- rutlandjewishcenter.org
- H. H. Baxter Memorial Library
- U.S. National Register of Historic Places
- Area: less than one acre
- Built: 1889
- NRHP reference No.: 78000239
- Added to NRHP: August 24, 1978

The Rutland Jewish Center is a non-denominational Jewish synagogue and religious community center located at 96 Grove Street in Rutland, Vermont, in the United States. The synagogue, owned by the Congregation Adath Israel, is located in the former H. H. Baxter Memorial Library building, a Richardsonian Romanesque structure that is listed on the National Register of Historic Places.

== Programs and services ==
The Rutland Jewish Center (RJC) provides a variety of cultural and educational services to the Jewish community of the Rutland area. It offers both adult and children's classes, the latter including Bar Mitzvah and Bat Mitzvah training.

== Architecture and building history ==
The RJC building is a cruciform structure, built out of grey marble quarried in West Rutland and laid in irregular courses. Prominent features include the arched entrance portico at the corner of Grove and Library Streets, and the multi-stage square tower that has an open top stage, each side featuring a pair of round-arched openings separated by a round column. The building was constructed as a library in 1889 by Mary E. Roberts Baxter in honor of her husband, Horace Henry Baxter, a New York City financier and part-owner of the Rutland Marble Company. The building was designed by Brunner & Tryon, and was opened to the public in 1895.

In 1927, the building was purchased by Congregation Adath Israel, which had been formed in Rutland in 1911. The domed section of the library was repurposed for use as the main synagogue. The building has since been sympathetically enlarged.

== See also ==
- National Register of Historic Places listings in Rutland County, Vermont
