= Adath Jeshurun of Jassy Synagogue =

Former synagogue in New York City

Adath Jeshurun of Jassy Synagogue (former)
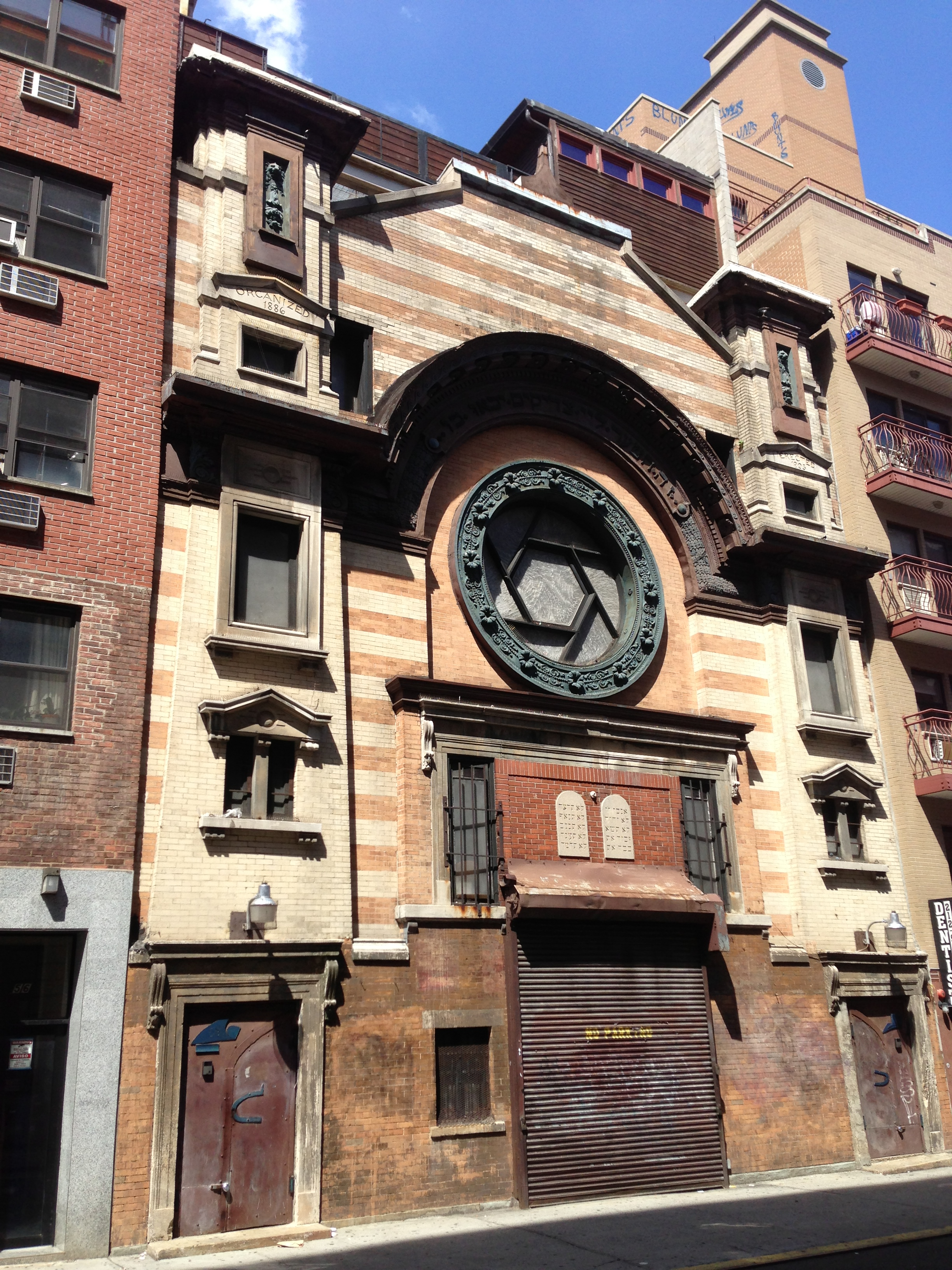
- The former Adath Jeshurun of Jassy Synagogue, in 2013

- Location in Lower Manhattan

Religion
- Affiliation: Orthodox Judaism (former)
- Ecclesiastical or organizational status: Synagogue (1904 – 1976); Art studios and residence (since 1979)
- Status: Closed

Location
- Location: 58-60 Rivington Street, Lower East Side, Manhattan, New York City, New York 10002
- Country: United States
- Interactive map of Adath Jeshurun of Jassy Synagogue (former)
- Coordinates: 40°43′15″N 73°59′25″W

Architecture
- Architect: Emery Roth
- Type: Synagogue
- Style: Moorish Revival
- Established: 1881 (as a congregation)
- Completed: 1904
- Materials: Brick

The Adath Jeshurun of Jassy Synagogue and later, the Erste Warshawer Synagogue is a former Orthodox Jewish synagogue located at 58-60 Rivington Street near Eldridge Street on the Lower East Side of Manhattan in New York City, New York, United States. The former synagogue was designed by architect Emery Roth, and completed in 1904 in the Moorish Revival style.

The building operated as a synagogue for two different congregations until 1976 when it closed and subsequently fell into disrepair. Since 1979, the building has been used as studios and residences for local artists.

== Synagogue history ==
=== First Romanian-American Congregation ===
At the turn of the 20th century, the Lower East Side became a refuge for hundreds of thousands of Jews who fled the pogroms, persecutions and economic distress of Eastern Europe. There were approximately 75,000 Romanian Jews in New York in 1914. The First Romanian-American Congregation, founded in 1881, worshiped in a small synagogue at 70 Hester Street; relocating in 1886 to 131 Hester Street.

In 1903, the congregation purchased an old tenement building at 58-60 Rivington Street and engaged Roth to build a synagogue with the cornerstone laid on November 22, 1903. The inauguration of the synagogue occurred in early September 1904, with over 10,000 people present. Falling into financial difficulty just a few years later, the congregation mortgaged the building to a developer, the Universal Building and Construction Co. By June 1907 the developer listed the synagogue for sale.

=== Erste Warschuer Congregation ===
By late 1908, it was reported that the Erste Warschuer Congregation (or First Warsaw Congregation), a group of Polish Jews organised in 1889, had acquired the building and renamed it as the Erste Warshawer Synagogue. However, a legal battle between the Romanian Jews and the developer lasted until 1910, when the New York State Supreme Court dismissed on appeal a claim that the Romanian congregation had an oral contract with the construction company and that it could buy back the building.

Large gatherings occurred at the synagogue with 2,000 people present for Lag B’Omer in 1916; 20,000 in 1922 for a memorial tribute to Bernard Bernstein, and 2,000 people in 1935 for a memorial tribute to Józef Piłsudski, both members of the Polish congregation. Regular members of the congregation included George and Ira Gershwin, Senator Jacob Javits, Samuel Goldwyn, and George Burns.

Following the Warsaw Ghetto uprising and the Holocaust, the synagogue became a focal point for American-Polish Jews. Hundreds of Polish immigrants would gather at the Warschuer synagogue, where services were conducted in Hebrew and Yiddish. However, the changing demographics of the Lower East Side resulted in many Jews relocating to Brooklyn. The 1975 death of pioneering Rabbi Nuta Shainberg, a Holocaust survivor who had been the congregation's leader for nearly three decades, was a significant turning point. By the following year the synagogue had closed.

== Subsequent use ==
In 1979 Hale Gurland, an artist, acquired the derelict former synagogue and renovated the property into studios and residences for local artists.
