= 10-deacetylbaccatin III 10-O-acetyltransferase =

Class of enzymes

Identifiers
- EC no.: 2.3.1.167
- CAS no.: 220946-63-4

Databases
- IntEnz: IntEnz view
- BRENDA: BRENDA entry
- ExPASy: NiceZyme view
- KEGG: KEGG entry
- MetaCyc: metabolic pathway
- PRIAM: profile
- PDB structures: RCSB PDB PDBe PDBsum
- Gene Ontology: AmiGO / QuickGO
Search
- PMC: articles
- PubMed: articles
- NCBI: proteins

10-deacetylbaccatin III 10-O-acetyltransferase (EC 2.3.1.167) is an enzyme that catalyzes the chemical reaction

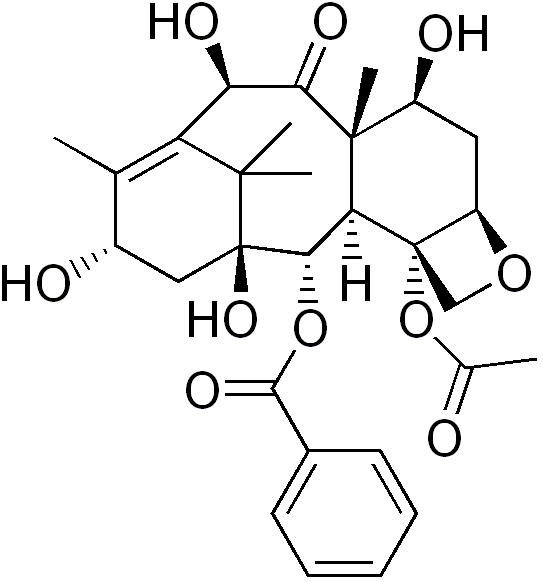
10-Deacetylbaccatin
+
acetyl-CoA
Baccatin III
+ coenzyme A

The enzyme completes the biosynthesis of baccatin III by transferring an acetyl group from acetyl-CoA to the intermediate 10-deacetylbaccatin, giving coenzyme A as a byproduct. It was isolated from yew trees (Genera Taxus) and the gene was expressed in Escherichia coli to allow characterisation. It has also been expressed in the mushroom Flammulina velutipes.

This enzyme belongs to the family of transferases, specifically those acyltransferases transferring groups other than aminoacyl groups. The systematic name of this enzyme class is acetyl-CoA:taxan-10beta-ol O-acetyltransferase.
