= Acorn Treatment and Housing =

Drug and Alcohol Treatment Provider

- Type: Rehabilitation centre
- Headquarters: England, United Kingdom
- Area served: North West England
- Services: Drug and alcohol treatment
- Website: acorntreatment.org

Acorn Treatment and Housing, formally known as ADAS (Alcohol and Drug Abstinence Service) is a drug and alcohol treatment provider in the North West of England. Its quasi-residential centres operate in Manchester, Stockport, Tameside, Oldham, Rochdale, Morecambe, Hull, Accrington, Clitheroe, Rawtenstall, Nelson and Burnley.

== History ==
ADAS was formed by Helen Massey Roche with support from a group of general practitioners in Manchester to provide affordable treatment to people affected by addiction. Its projects were funded through the National Lottery.

ADAS formed a day care centre in a shop in Stockport in 1997 and later moved to the larger Oak House. In 2003, it opened its first residential rehabilitation programme at Acorn House in Levenshulme.

== Operations ==
Acorn's treatment model is based on a set of principles which give people affected by addiction a course of action that solves their substance misuse problem. It is intended to replace destructive attitudes such as self-centeredness with selflessness.

Acorn runs the Reduction and Motivation Programme (RAMP) which encourages individuals, through psychosocial intervention, toward reduction and possibly abstinence. The program is administered through Community Drug Team's (CDT), Community Alcohol Team's (CAT) and prisons across the North West.

The Dependency, Emotional, Attachment Programme (DEAP) is another abstinence based treatment Acorn developed which incorporates psychodynamic therapy, Gestalt psychology, Cognitive behavioral therapy and Rational Emotive Therapy in a 12- to 20-week program.

Its STAR programme works to teach clients core skills for entering back into employment which includes a ‘Recovery Coach’ qualification from the Institute of Leadership and Management.

Acorn also runs a housing service for its clients.

== Community involvement ==
Acorn has created a non-profit video production company BadKamra, which gives its clients work experience, training in media skills and production techniques. It airs a range of podcasts on the firm's website .

Its project Restore provides its clients with employment and training. It restores pieces of furniture and sells gifts and other home accessories. Cafe Serenity provides further job opportunities for its previous clients.
