= Architecture Design and Assessment System =

Defunct software package

The Architecture Design and Assessment System (ADAS) was a set of software programs offered by the Research Triangle Institute from the mid-1980s until the early 1990s.

A petri net-like graph model of a system was graphically created. The hierarchical graphs were simulated to determine resource utilization and throughput. Functional simulation of the model could be realized by attaching C or Ada code to the nodes. This enabled dynamic resource assignment, timing, and priority.

== Simulation Model ==
An ADAS model consisted of nodes connected by directed arcs.

For abstract simulation a node represents a process (systems engineering) in the system that is being modeled. The readiness for execution or firing of this process requires that: its inputs are satisfied, space is available for its outputs, and its shared resource/hardware is available. During execution the node consumes its inputs, uses the resource for the prescribed duration, then produces its outputs.

The inputs and outputs of a process are represented by discrete tokens. These tokens flow along the arcs in the graph. If the maximum arc size is greater than one, then an arc would represent a buffer between system processes.

To refine the model of the system, a subgraph could be placed below the node to refine the behavior of that process.

Physical and behavioral properties were attached to nodes and arcs in the form of attributes. The attribute definition language allowed the computation of attributes from ancestor attributes and global values.
