= Adath Shalom (Philadelphia) =

Synagogue in Pennsylvania, United States

Adath Shalom Synagogue / Preah Buddah Rangsey Temple
- Hebrew: עדת שלום
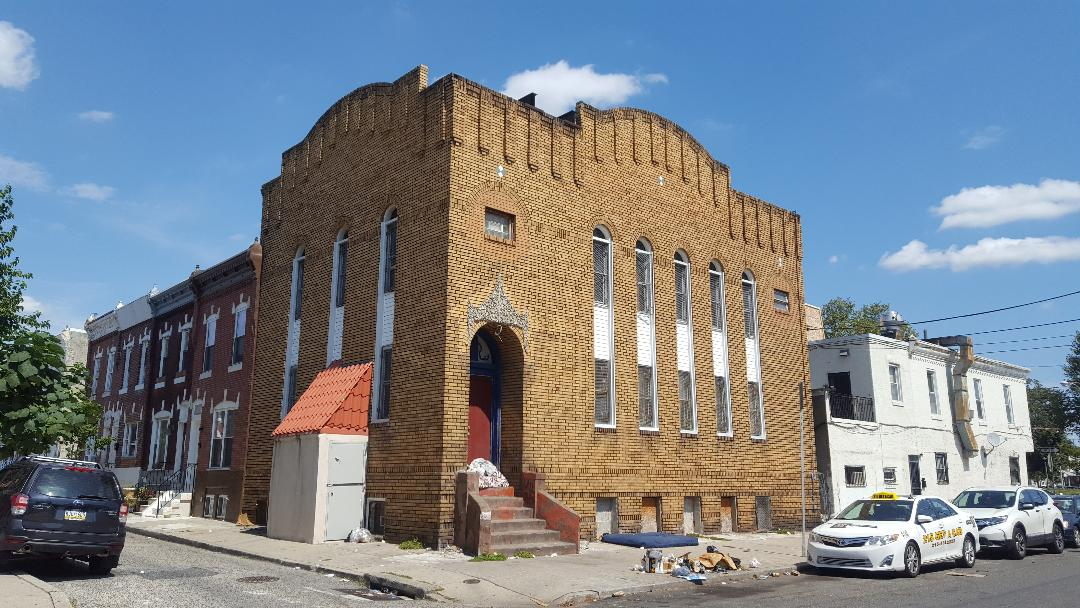
- 607 W Ritner St on September 1, 2019

- Location of the building in Philadelphia

Religion
- Affiliation: Judaism (1922 – 2007); Buddhism (2007 – 2017)
- Ecclesiastical or organisational status: Former synagogue; Former Buddhist temple
- Status: Closed: 2007 as a synagogue; 2017 as a temple

Location
- Location: 607 W Ritner St, South Philadelphia, Pennsylvania
- Country: United States
- Coordinates: 39°55′09″N 75°09′28″W

Architecture
- Type: Synagogue
- Completed: 1922 or 1930

Adath Shalom (Hebrew: עדת שלום) was a Conservative Jewish synagogue located at 607 W Ritner Street, in the Whitman neighborhood of South Philadelphia, Pennsylvania, in the United States. The synagogue opened in 1922 and closed in 2007.

The building was most recently used as the Preah Buddah Rangsey Temple, a Buddhist temple. It was sold in February 2018 and, as of 2019, was unoccupied.

== History ==
Adath Shalom formed in 1950 as a Conservative synagogue when Shaare Israel, B’nai Moshe, and Beth Samuel merged and formed in Beth Samuel's building. Adath Shalom closed in 2007, donated many of its religious articles to Congregation Tiferes B'nai Israel in Warrington, Pennsylvania, and sold its building to the Cambodian Khmer Buddhist Humanitarian Association.

=== Jewish congregation ===
Beth Samuel Nusach Ashkenazi was incorporated in 1922 by Lithuanian Jews and was often referred to as Beys Shmuel, or the litvishe shul.

After merging with another congregation in 1961, it was renamed Adath Shalom and affiliated with the United Synagogue of Conservative Judaism.

Rabbi Aaron Decter led the congregation in the 1960s. He was chairman of human relations for the South Philadelphia Citizens Committee, and spoke out in favor of Philadelphia's school bussing program in 1965. Robert P. Tabak was rabbi from 1977 to 1979. The Jewish Exponent synagogue directory identified Mendel Litman as cantor and Samuel Cander as president in September 1995 when it was affiliated with the United Synagogue of Conservative Judaism. Gail Glickman served as Adath Shalom's last rabbi on a part-time basis.

The synagogue last held High Holiday services in 2004, and closed in 2007 when the congregation's aging members could no longer form a prayer quorum.

In 2006, Congregation Tiferes B'nai Israel in Warrington, Pennsylvania was planning to renovate its sanctuary when Adath Shalom was divesting its building. TBI repurposed Adath Shalom's ark and lecterns, acquired and displayed its memorial plaques, and Adath Shalom paid for many of the renovations at TBI. Tiferes B’nai Israel welcomed former Adath Shalom members to the rededication in November 2012.

=== Buddhist temple ===
To serve the growing Cambodian community in the neighborhood, the Cambodian Khmer Buddhist Humanitarian Association purchased Saint Andrews Lutheran Church at 6th and Ritner Streets in 2003, renovated the building, and opened the Preah Buddah Rangsey Temple in 2005. The Buddhist temple quickly reached capacity and the KBHA acquired the Adath Shalom building across the street in April 2007.

The Khmer Buddhist Humanitarian Association used the synagogue building for community meetings, funeral ceremonies, and as quarters for its monks. The Buddhist temple retained many of its Jewish decorative elements. The synagogue's ceiling murals of the Zodiac signs with the names of the months in Hebrew were retain together with the two tablets of the Ten Commandments over the main entrance. The former synagogue's second floor women's gallery was repurposed for memorial cubbies to temple members, as a gallery for Buddhist funeral urns.

== Building sale ==
Preah Buddah Rangsey vacated the synagogue building in 2017 and listed the property and building for sale. In February 2018, Penh Investment Penn LLC acquired the building for $230,000.

== See also ==
- Jewish Quarter of Philadelphia
