= 10-Deacetylbaccatin =

10-Deacetylbaccatin III
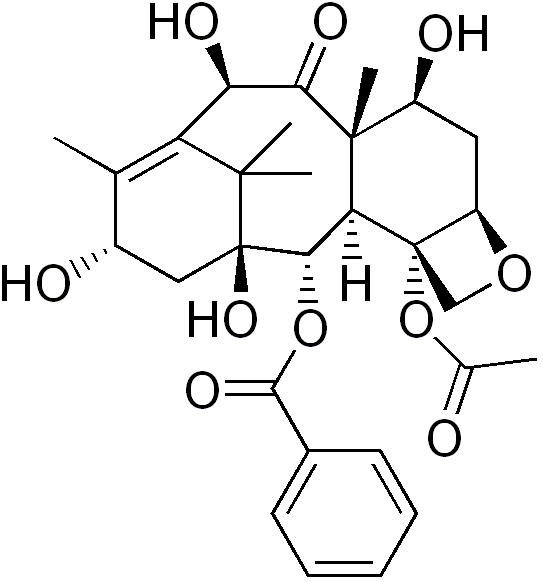

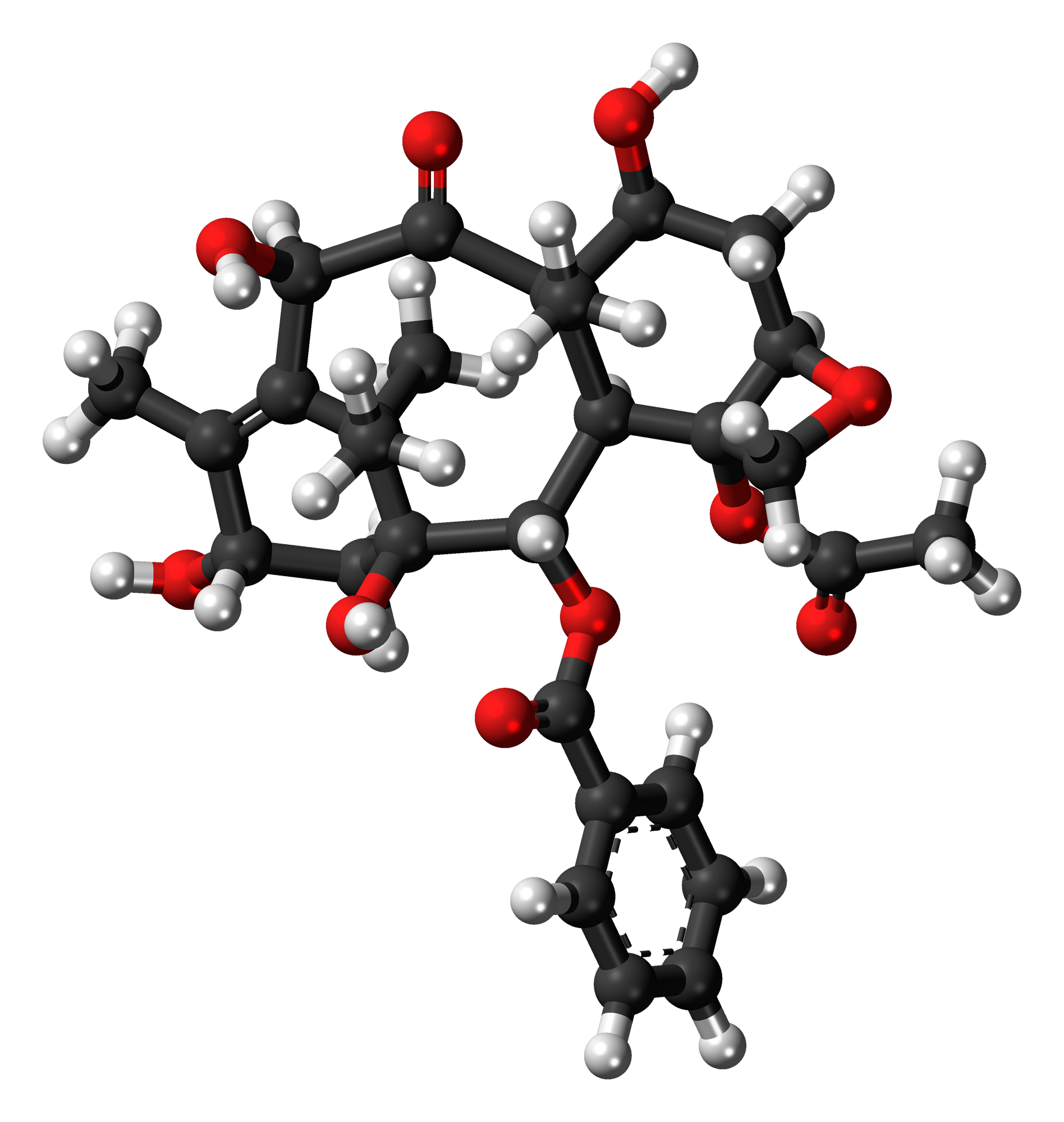

Names
- IUPAC name 1,7β,10β,13α-Tetrahydroxy-9-oxo-5β,20-epoxytax-11-ene-2α,4-diyl 2-benzoate 4-acetate
- Systematic IUPAC name (2aR,4S,4aS,6R,9S,11S,12S,12aR,12bS)-4,6,9,11-Tetrahydroxy-4a,8,13,13-tetramethyl-5-oxo-2a,3,4,4a,5,6,9,10,11,12,12a,12b-dodecahydro-1H-7,11-methanocyclodeca[3,4]benzo[1,2-b]oxete-12,12b-diyl 12b-acetate 12-benzoate
- Other names 10-Deacetylbaccatin III; 10-Deacetylbaccatine III

Identifiers
CAS Number	32981-86-5
3D model (JSmol)	Interactive image
ChEBI	CHEBI:18193
ChEMBL	ChEMBL393912
ChemSpider	135935
ECHA InfoCard	100.128.614
PubChem CID	154272
UNII	4K6EWW2Z45
CompTox Dashboard (EPA)	DTXSID80865659
- InChI: InChI=1S/C29H36O10/c1-14-17(31)12-29(36)24(38-25(35)16-9-7-6-8-10-16)22-27(5,23(34)21(33)20(14)26(29,3)4)18(32)11-19-28(22,13-37-19)39-15(2)30/h6-10,17-19,21-22,24,31-33,36H,11-13H2,1-5H3/t17-,18-,19+,21+,22-,24-,27+,28-,29+/m0/s1 Key: YWLXLRUDGLRYDR-ZHPRIASZSA-N
- SMILES: CC1=C2C(C(=O)C3(C(CC4C(C3C(C(C2(C)C)(CC1O)O)OC(=O)C5=CC=CC=C5)(CO4)OC(=O)C)O)C)O

Properties
Chemical formula	C_{29}H_{36}O_{10}
Molar mass	544.59 g/mol
Appearance	colorless solid
Melting point	234 °C (453 °F; 507 K)
Solubility in water	insoluble
Solubility	soluble in methanol
- Except where otherwise noted, data are given for materials in their standard state (at 25 °C [77 °F], 100 kPa). Infobox references

10-Deacetylbaccatins are a series of closely related natural organic compounds isolated from the yew tree (Genera Taxus). 10-deacetylbaccatin III is a precursor to the anti-cancer drug docetaxel (Taxotere).

10-deacetylbaccatin III 10-O-acetyltransferase converts 10-deacetylbaccatin to baccatin III:

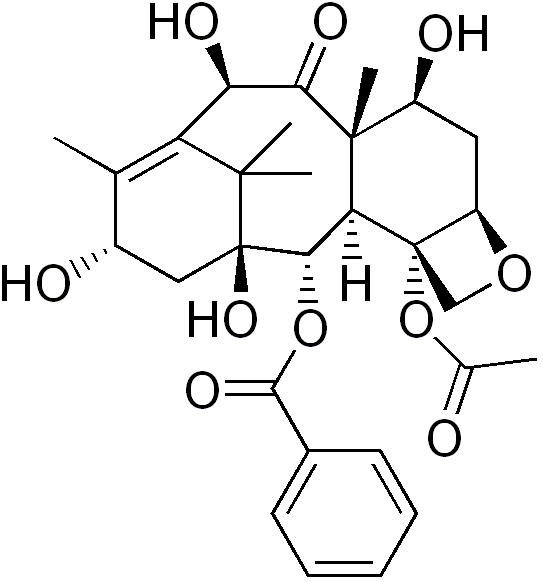
10-Deacetylbaccatin
+
acetyl-CoA
Baccatin III
+ coenzyme A
