= Congregation Adath Jeshurun =

Former synagogue now church in Boston, Massachusetts, US

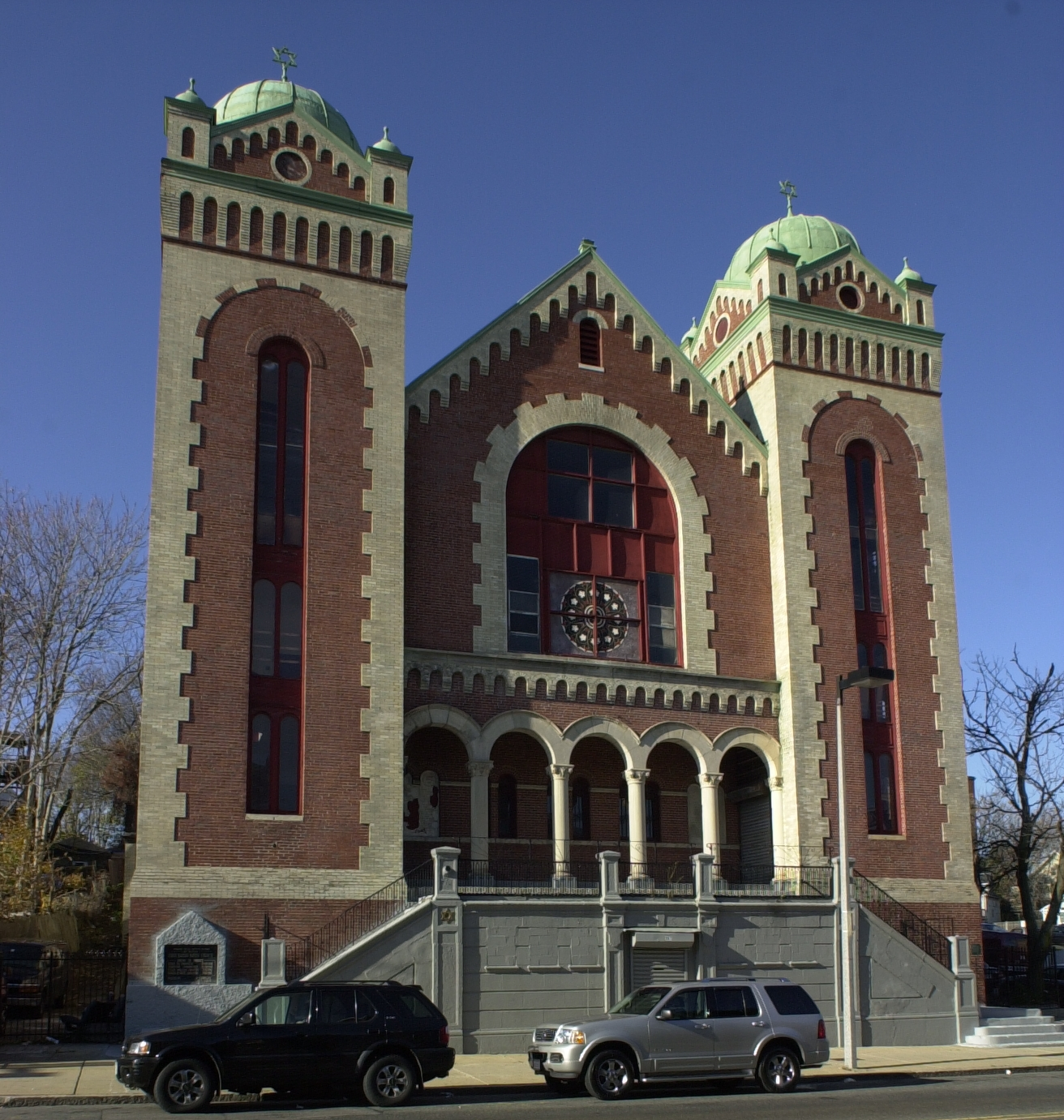

- Location in Massachusetts
- 42°18′41″N 71°4′53.5″W
- Location: 397 Blue Hill Avenue, Roxbury, Boston, Massachusetts
- Country: United States
- Denomination: Judaism (1909–1967); Baptist (since 1978)

History
- Status: Synagogue (1909–1967); Church (since 1967)
- Founded: 1894 (as a congregation)
- Founder: David Krokyn (General Contractor)

Architecture
- Functional status: Closed (as a synagogue); Repurposed (as a church)
- Architect: Frederick Norcross
- Architectural type: Synagogue architecture
- Style: Romanesque Revival
- Completed: 1906
- Congregation Adath Jeshurun
- U.S. National Register of Historic Places
- Area: less than one acre
- NRHP reference No.: 99001304
- Added to NRHP: November 12, 1999

Congregation Adath Jeshurun is an historic former synagogue, serving as a church since 1967, at 397 Blue Hill Avenue in the Roxbury neighborhood of Boston, Massachusetts, in the United States.

The congregation was formed in 1894. As the Jewish community of Roxbury gradually moved away, its congregation dwindled and in 1967 it was sold to Ecclesia Apostolic Church. It was purchased by its present owner, the First Haitian Baptist Church, in 1978. The church has restored it to its present condition.

The Romanesque Revival style building was designed in 1906 by Frederick Norcross and built by David Krokyn and added to the National Register of Historic Places in 1999.

== Gallery ==
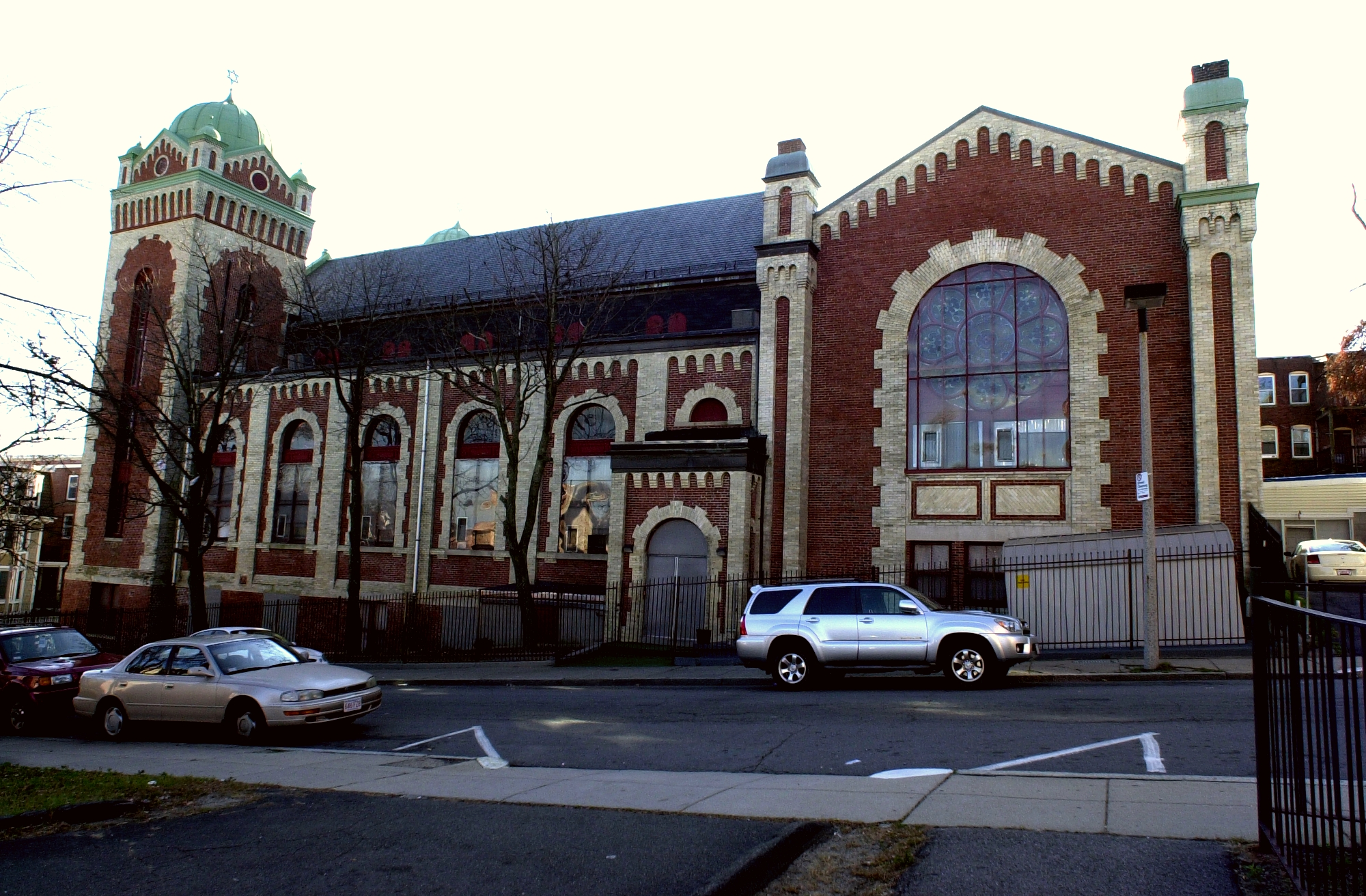

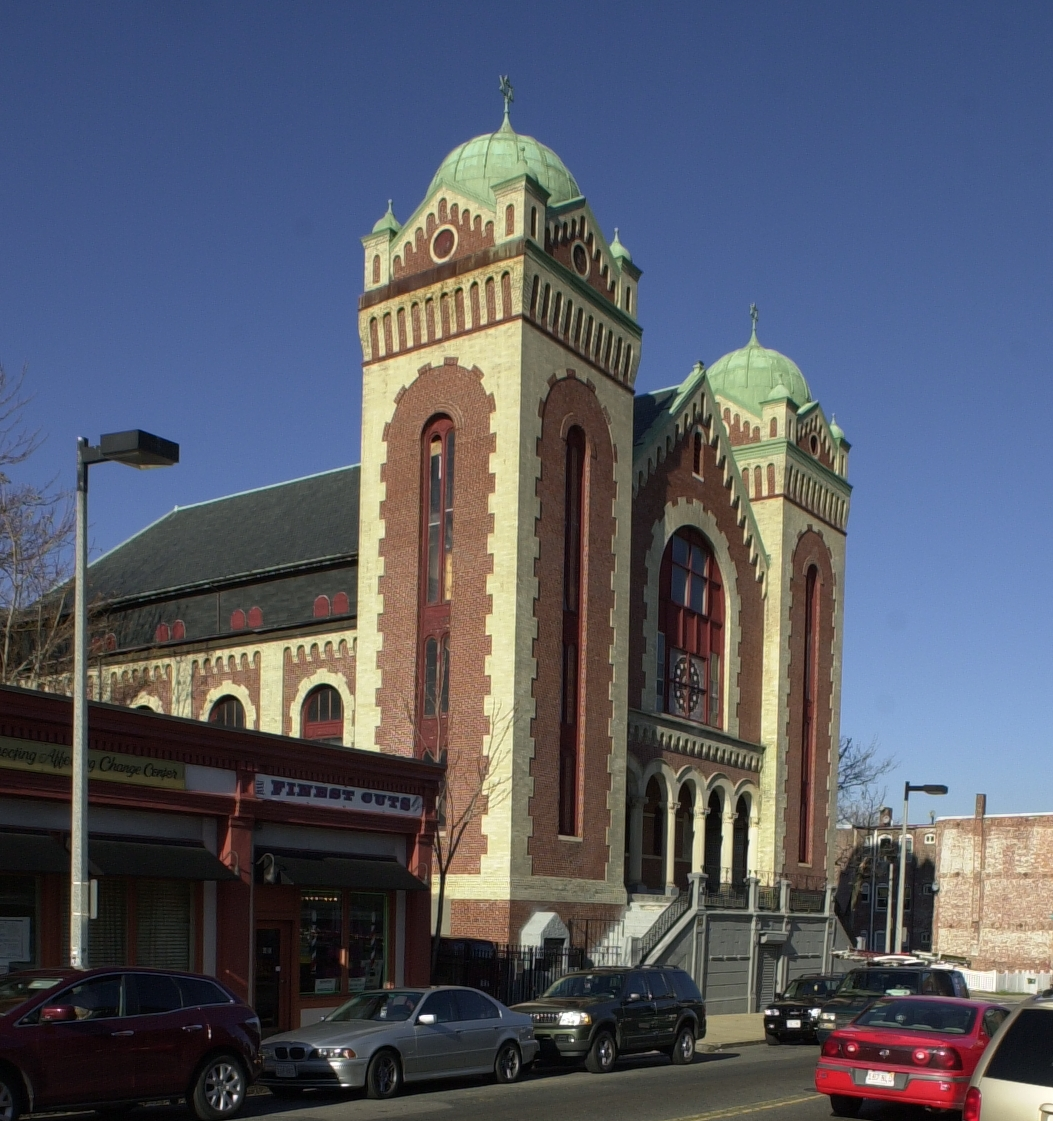

== See also ==
- National Register of Historic Places listings in southern Boston, Massachusetts

== Official website ==
Media related to Congregation Adath Jeshurun at Wikimedia Commons

- Official website of the First Haitian Baptist Church of Boston
