= Temple Adas Israel (Sag Harbor) =

Reform synagogue in Sag Harbor, New York, US

- Location on Long Island, New York

Religion
- Affiliation: Reform Judaism
- Ecclesiastical or organizational status: Synagogue
- Leadership: Rabbi Daniel N. Geffen; Rabbi Leon Morris (Emeritus)
- Status: Active

Location
- Location: Sag Harbor, Suffolk County, Long Island, New York
- Country: United States
- Interactive map of Temple Adas Israel
- Coordinates: 40°59′47″N 72°17′26″W

Architecture
- Type: Synagogue
- Style: Gothic Revival
- Established: 1893 (as a congregation)
- Completed: 1898
- Materials: Clapboard

Website
- templeadasisrael.org

Temple Adas Israel is Reform Jewish synagogue in Sag Harbor, Suffolk County, on Long Island, New York, in the United States. It is one of the 19th century synagogue buildings in the United States.

== History ==
Describing itself as "Long Island’s oldest synagogue", (Note: This claim ignores synagogues in the New York City boroughs of Brooklyn and Queens, which are also on Long Island.) Temple Adas Israel was founded as the Orthodox Congregation Mishkan Israel in 1893, the temple purchased land 1896, and the building was completed in 1898. The Brooklyn Daily Eagle attributed the creation of the new congregation to the establishment of Fahy's watchcase factory, which had drawn a large number of Russian and Polish-Jewish workingmen to Sag Harbor. Within a short time, there were 15 Jewish-owned retail stores in the village and the Brooklyn Eagle reported that Jewish success in retailing fruit and clothing "testify to their industry."

The simple, vernacular building is a rectangle, 24 by 30 feet (7.3 by 9.1 m), with a pitched roof. The entrance door is dignified by a flight of stairs and flanked by Gothic Revival, pointed-arch windows, the other windows are round-arched.

In 2023, the synagogue engaged in a controversy about who would be the town's Santa Claus. Ken Dorph, a local expert on the Middle East, was invited by a member to attend a discussion labeled, "Answering Tough Questions on Israel." Due to questions asked by Dorph, members of the congregation campaigned successfully to have Dorph removed as the town's Santa Claus. Rabbi Daniel Geffen said the temple's leadership was not involved, but said it was a lesson on exercising free speech responsibly.
