= Fairmount, Gauteng =

Fairmount
- Location within Gauteng Location within South Africa
- Coordinates: 26°08′41″S 28°5′56″E
- Country: South Africa
- Province: Gauteng
- Municipality: City of Johannesburg
- Main Place: Johannesburg
- Established: 23 March 1938; 81 years ago

Area
  - Total: 0.47 km^{2} (0.18 sq mi)

Population (2011)
  - Total: 1,074
  - Density: 2,300/km^{2} (5,900/sq mi)

Racial makeup (2011)
  - Black African: 30.63%
  - Coloured: 0.56%
  - Indian/Asian: 0.09%
  - White: 68.72%

First languages (2011)
  - English: 70.2%
  - Zulu: 6.05%
  - Afrikaans: 5.31%
  - Sepedi: 3.91%
  - Other: 14.53%
- Time zone: UTC+2 (SAST)
- Postal code (street): 2192

Fairmount is a suburb of Johannesburg, South Africa. It is a small suburb tucked between Glenhazel and Sydenham. It is located in Region E of the City of Johannesburg Metropolitan Municipality.

== History ==
Before the discovery of gold on the Witwatersrand in 1886, the suburb lay on land on one of the original farms called Klipfontein. It became a suburb on 23 March 1938, developed by Leslie John Elderkin and the suburb name originates after a visit by the former to the Fairmount Hotel in Livingstone.
