= Mannopeptimycin glycopeptide =

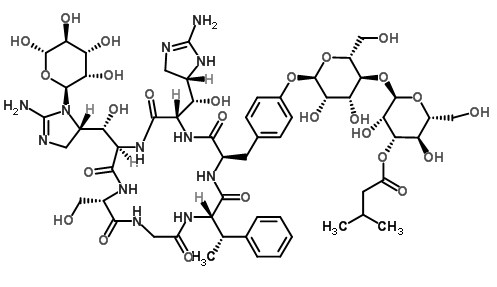

Names
- IUPAC name [(2R,3S,4S,5R,6R)-2-[(2R,3S,4R,5S,6R)-6-[4-[[(2R,5S,8R,11S,17S)-5-[(R)-[(4S)-2-amino-4,5-dihydro-1H-imidazol-4-yl]-hydroxymethyl]-8-[(R)-[(4S)-2-amino-3-[(2S,3S,4R,5S,6S)-3,4,5,6-tetrahydroxyoxan-2-yl]-4,5-dihydroimidazol-4-yl]-hydroxymethyl]-11-(hydroxymethyl)-3,6,9,12,15,18-hexaoxo-17-[(1S)-1-phenylethyl]-1,4,7,10,13,16-hexazacyclooctadec-2-yl]methyl]phenoxy]-4,5-dihydroxy-2-(hydroxymethyl)oxan-3-yl]oxy-3,5-dihydroxy-6-(hydroxymethyl)oxan-4-yl] 3-methylbutanoate

Identifiers
3D model (JSmol)	Interactive image
ChEMBL	ChEMBL439078
ChemSpider	23114590
PubChem CID	136135870
- InChI: InChI=1S/C58H84N12O26/c1-21(2)13-33(75)94-47-39(78)30(19-72)92-56(45(47)84)95-46-31(20-73)93-55(44(83)41(46)80)91-25-11-9-23(10-12-25)14-26-49(86)68-35(37(76)27-15-62-57(59)66-27)52(89)69-36(38(77)29-16-63-58(60)70(29)53-42(81)40(79)43(82)54(90)96-53)51(88)65-28(18-71)48(85)61-17-32(74)67-34(50(87)64-26)22(3)24-7-5-4-6-8-24/h4-12,21-22,26-31,34-47,53-56,71-73,76-84,90H,13-20H2,1-3H3,(H2,60,63)(H,61,85)(H,64,87)(H,65,88)(H,67,74)(H,68,86)(H,69,89)(H3,59,62,66)/t22-,26+,27-,28-,29-,30+,31+,34-,35-,36+,37-,38-,39+,40+,41+,42-,43-,44-,45-,46+,47-,53-,54-,55-,56+/m0/s1 Key: HGEQEKWFMRZMKT-ONIHXMSRSA-N
- SMILES: CC(C)CC(=O)O[C@H]1[C@H](O)[C@@H](CO)O[C@H](O[C@H]2[C@H](O)[C@H](O)[C@@H](Oc3ccc(C[C@H]4NC(=O)[C@@H](NC(=O)CNC(=O)[C@H](CO)NC(=O)[C@H](NC(=O)[C@@H](NC4=O)[C@@H](O)[C@@H]5CN=C(N)N5)[C@@H](O)[C@@H]6CN=C(N)N6[C@H]7O[C@H](O)[C@@H](O)[C@H](O)[C@@H]7O)[C@@H](C)c8ccccc8)cc3)O[C@@H]2CO)[C@H]1O

Properties
Chemical formula	C_{58}H_{84}N_{12}O_{26}
Molar mass	1365.368 g·mol^{−1}
- Except where otherwise noted, data are given for materials in their standard state (at 25 °C [77 °F], 100 kPa). Infobox references

Mannopeptimycin glycopeptide is a lead antibiotic peptide.
