= 4-Mercapto-4-methyl-2-pentanone =

Names
- Preferred IUPAC name 4-Methyl-4-sulfanylpentan-2-one
- Other names 4-Mercapto-4-methylpentan-2-one; 4-Methyl-4-mercapto-2-pentanone; 4-Sulfanyl-4-methylpentan-2-one; 4-Sulphanyl-4-methylpentan-2-one; 2-Pentanone, 4-mercapto-4-methyl-; 4-Methyl-4-mercaptopentan-2-one; 4-Methyl-4-thiolpentan-2-one; 4-Methyl-4-sulfanyl-2-pentanone

Identifiers
CAS Number	19872-52-7
3D model (JSmol)	Interactive image
ChEBI	CHEBI:77856
ChemSpider	79650
ECHA InfoCard	100.039.427
EC Number	243-386-8
PubChem CID	88290
UNII	9524RG5ZQL
CompTox Dashboard (EPA)	DTXSID8051839
- InChI: InChI=1S/C6H12OS/c1-5(7)4-6(2,3)8/h8H,4H2,1-3H3 Key: QRNZMFDCKKEPSX-UHFFFAOYSA-N
- SMILES: CC(=O)CC(C)(C)S

Properties
Chemical formula	C_{6}H_{12}OS
Molar mass	132.22 g·mol^{−1}

Hazards
- GHS labelling
Pictograms	(GHS02: Flammable) (GHS07: Exclamation mark)
Signal word	Warning
Hazard statements	H226, H315, H319, H335
Precautionary statements	P210, P233, P240, P241, P242, P243, P261, P264, P264+P265, P271, P280, P302+P352, P303+P361+P353, P304+P340, P305+P351+P338, P319, P321, P332+P317, P337+P317, P362+P364, P370+P378, P403+P233, P403+P235, P405, P501
- Except where otherwise noted, data are given for materials in their standard state (at 25 °C [77 °F], 100 kPa). Infobox references

4-Mercapto-4-methyl-2-pentanone is an aroma compound with the chemical formula C_{6}H_{12}OS . It has a tropical flavor. It is found in Sauvignon wines and is a potent odorant of new-world hops.
