= Hedamycin =

Identifiers
CAS Number	11048-97-8
3D model (JSmol)	Interactive image
ChEMBL	ChEMBL1979887
ChemSpider	5034760
PubChem CID	98033
CompTox Dashboard (EPA)	DTXSID301028214
- InChI: InChI=1S/C41H50N2O11/c1-16-11-22-30(37-28(16)24(44)14-27(53-37)41(6)39(54-41)36-18(3)52-36)35(48)31-29(34(22)47)20(25-13-23(42(7)8)32(45)17(2)50-25)12-21(33(31)46)26-15-40(5,43(9)10)38(49)19(4)51-26/h11-12,14,17-19,23,25-26,32,36,38-39,45-46,49H,13,15H2,1-10H3 Key: RZOFHOWMWMTHDX-UHFFFAOYSA-N
- SMILES: CC1C(C(CC(O1)C2=CC(=C(C3=C2C(=O)C4=C(C3=O)C5=C(C(=C4)C)C(=O)C=C(O5)C6(C(O6)C7C(O7)C)C)O)C8CC(C(C(O8)C)O)(C)N(C)C)N(C)C)O

Properties
Chemical formula	C_{41}H_{50}N_{2}O_{11}
Molar mass	746.854 g·mol^{−1}
- Except where otherwise noted, data are given for materials in their standard state (at 25 °C [77 °F], 100 kPa). Infobox references

Hedamycin is a chemical compound with potential antibiotic and anticancer activity.
