= 2-Oxohistidine =

Names
- IUPAC name 3-(2-Oxo-2H-imidazol-4-yl)alanine

Identifiers
| CAS Number | 181996-08-7 |
| 3D model (JSmol) | Interactive image |
| ChemSpider | 19981749 |
| PubChem CID | 127761 |
| CompTox Dashboard (EPA) | DTXSID20934257 |
- InChI: InChI=1S/C6H7N3O3/c7-4(5(10)11)1-3-2-8-6(12)9-3/h2,4H,1,7H2,(H,10,11) COPY Key: MWUSZYAURGSGRY-UHFFFAOYSA-N
- SMILES: C1=NC(=O)N=C1CC(C(=O)O)N

Properties
| Chemical formula | C_{6}H_{7}N_{3}O_{3} |
| Molar mass | 169.140 g·mol^{−1} |
| Appearance | white solid |
- Except where otherwise noted, data are given for materials in their standard state (at 25 °C [77 °F], 100 kPa). Infobox references

2-Oxohistidine is a derivative of histidine damaged by reactive oxygen species. It is a biological marker for assessing protein modifications from oxidative stress. In particular, it arises by iron-catalyzed reaction with hydrogen peroxide.
