= Thorium difluoride =

Names
- Other names Thorium(2+) difluoride, thorium(II) fluoride

Identifiers
| CAS Number | 28844-11-3 |
| 3D model (JSmol) | Interactive image |
| ChemSpider | 19971756 |
| PubChem CID | 141443 |
| CompTox Dashboard (EPA) | DTXSID40183043 |
- InChI: InChI=1S/2FH.Th/h2*1H;/q;;+2/p-2 Key: ZPJQJFASYCZWOU-UHFFFAOYSA-L
- SMILES: F[Th]F

Properties
| Chemical formula | F_{2}Th |
| Molar mass | 270.0345 g·mol^{−1} |
- Except where otherwise noted, data are given for materials in their standard state (at 25 °C [77 °F], 100 kPa). Infobox references

Thorium difluoride is a binary inorganic compound of thorium metal and fluorine with the chemical formula ThF_{2}.

== Synthesis ==
Thorium difluoride has been detected mass spectrometrically in the reaction of Ca(g) with ThF_{4}(g):

2Ca(g) + ThF_{4}(g) → 2CaF(g) + ThF_{2}(g)
