= Thallium triiodide =

Thallium(I) triiodide
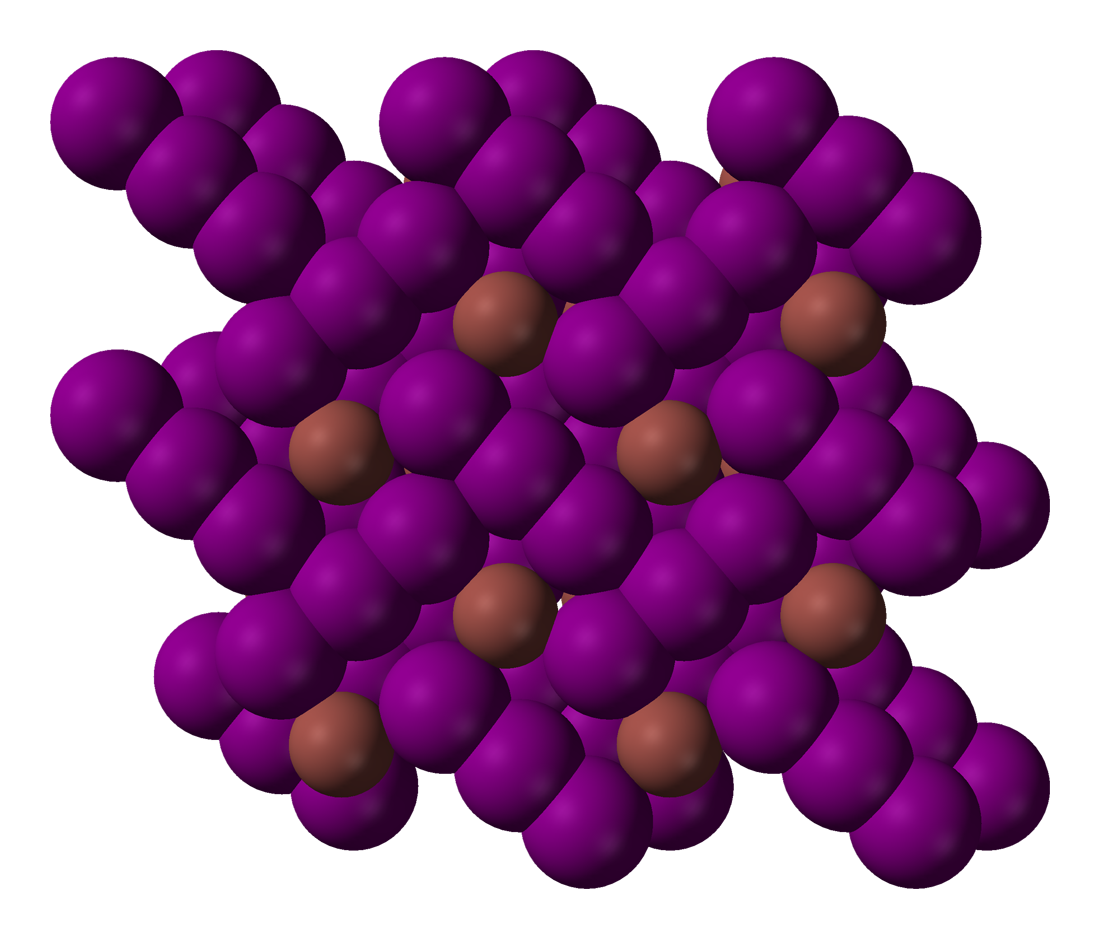
- Thallium triiodide

Names
- IUPAC name Thallium(I) triiodide
- Other names thallous triiodide

Identifiers
CAS Number	60488-29-1; 13453-37-7
3D model (JSmol)	Interactive image
ChemSpider	14888331
EC Number	236-627-3
PubChem CID	20233350
CompTox Dashboard (EPA)	DTXSID70928661
- InChI: InChI=1S/I3.Tl/c1-3-2;/q-1;+1 Key: CFEVJLSKLTWQJS-UHFFFAOYSA-N
- SMILES: [Tl+].I[I-]I

Properties
Chemical formula	TlI_{3}
Molar mass	585.09 g·mol^{−1}
Appearance	black crystalline solid

Hazards
- GHS labelling
Pictograms	(GHS06: Toxic) (GHS08: Health hazard) (GHS09: Environmental hazard)
Signal word	Danger
Hazard statements	H300, H330, H373, H411
NFPA 704 (fire diamond)	4

Related compounds
Other cations	Ammonium triiodide; Rubidium triiodide; Caesium triiodide
Related compounds	Phosphorus heptabromide ([PBr_{4}]^{+}[Br_{3}]^{−})
- Except where otherwise noted, data are given for materials in their standard state (at 25 °C [77 °F], 100 kPa). verify (what is ?) Infobox references

Thallium triiodide, more precisely thallium(I) triiodide is a chemical compound of thallium and iodine with empirical formula TlI_{3}. Unlike the other thallium trihalides, which contain thallium(III), TlI_{3} is actually a thallium(I) salt containing thallium(I) cations Tl^{+} and triiodide anions [I_{3}]^{−}, and thus has the chemical formula Tl^{+}[I_{3}]^{−}. It is a black crystalline solid.

== Redox properties ==
Traditionally, the reason why Tl^{+} is not oxidised to Tl^{3+} in the reaction:

Tl^{3+} + 2 I^{−} → Tl^{+} + I_{2}

is ascribed to the standard reduction potentials of notional half-cells which are:

Tl^{3+} + 2 e^{−} → Tl^{+}; E_{r}° = 1.252
I_{2} + 2 e^{−} → 2 I^{−}; E_{r}° = 0.5355

The favoured reaction is therefore the reduction of Tl^{3+} to Tl^{+} (1.252 > 0.5355). Using standard electrode potentials in this way must be done with caution, if considering species beyond neutral aqueous solution. Electrode potentials vary (and vary differently) with pH, with solvent, and with any other ligands present.

In fact, thallium triiodide reacts in alcoholic base to give thallium(III) species, and adds additional iodide ions to give the tetraiodothallate(III) ion [TlI_{4}]^{−} (isoelectronic with tetraiodomercurate, [HgI_{4}]^{2−}). These properties may extend in methanol to neutral pH: the ultraviolet spectrum suggests that in such solutions, TlI_{3} ionizes to Tl[TlI_{4}]_{3}.

== Structure and preparation ==
TlI_{3} is formulated Tl^{+}[I_{3}]^{−}, and has a similar structure to NH_{4}I_{3}, CsI_{3} and RbI_{3}. The triiodide ion in TlI_{3} is nearly linear but is asymmetric with one iodine–iodine bond longer than the other. For comparison the dimensions of the triiodide, I_{a}–I_{b}–I_{c}, ions in the different compounds are shown below:

compound	I_{a}–I_{b} (pm)	I_{b}–I_{c} (pm)	angle (°)
TlI_{3}	306.3	282.6	177.90
RbI_{3}	305.1	283.3	178.11
CsI_{3}	303.8	284.2	178.00
NH_{4}I_{3}	311.4	279.7	178.55

TlI_{3} can be prepared by the evaporation of stoichiometric quantities of thallium(I) iodide (TlI) and iodine in concentrated aqueous hydriodic acid, or by reacting TlI with iodine in ethanol.
