= Caesium chloride =

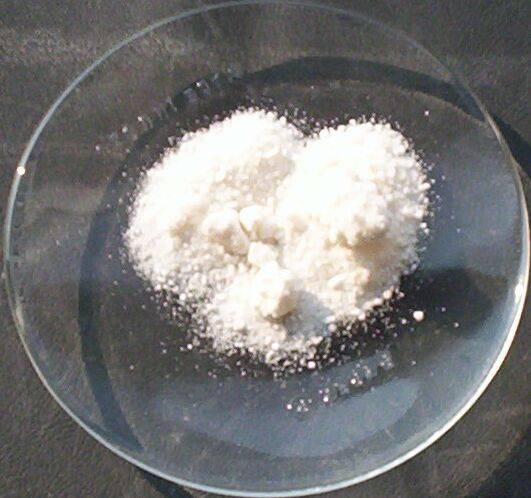

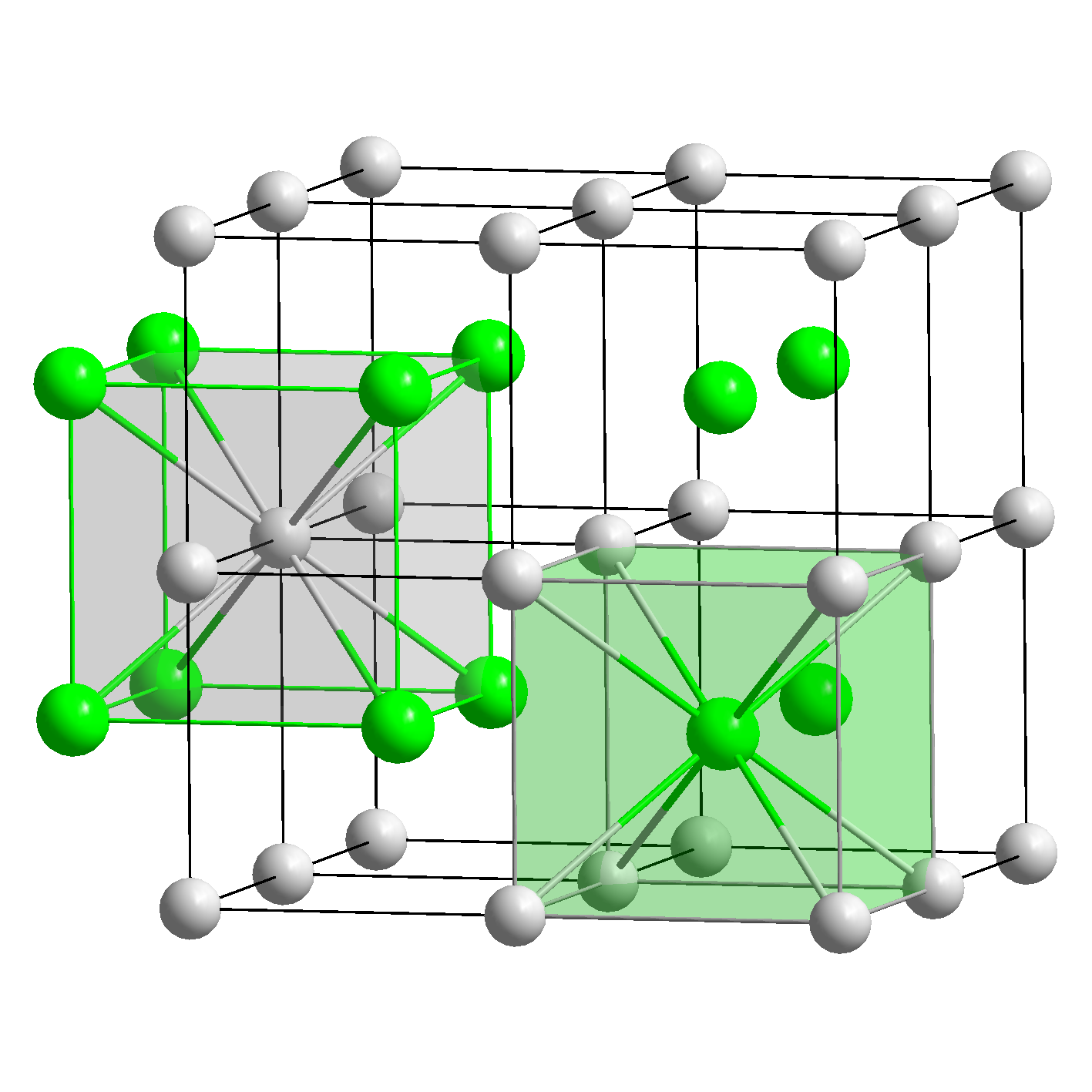

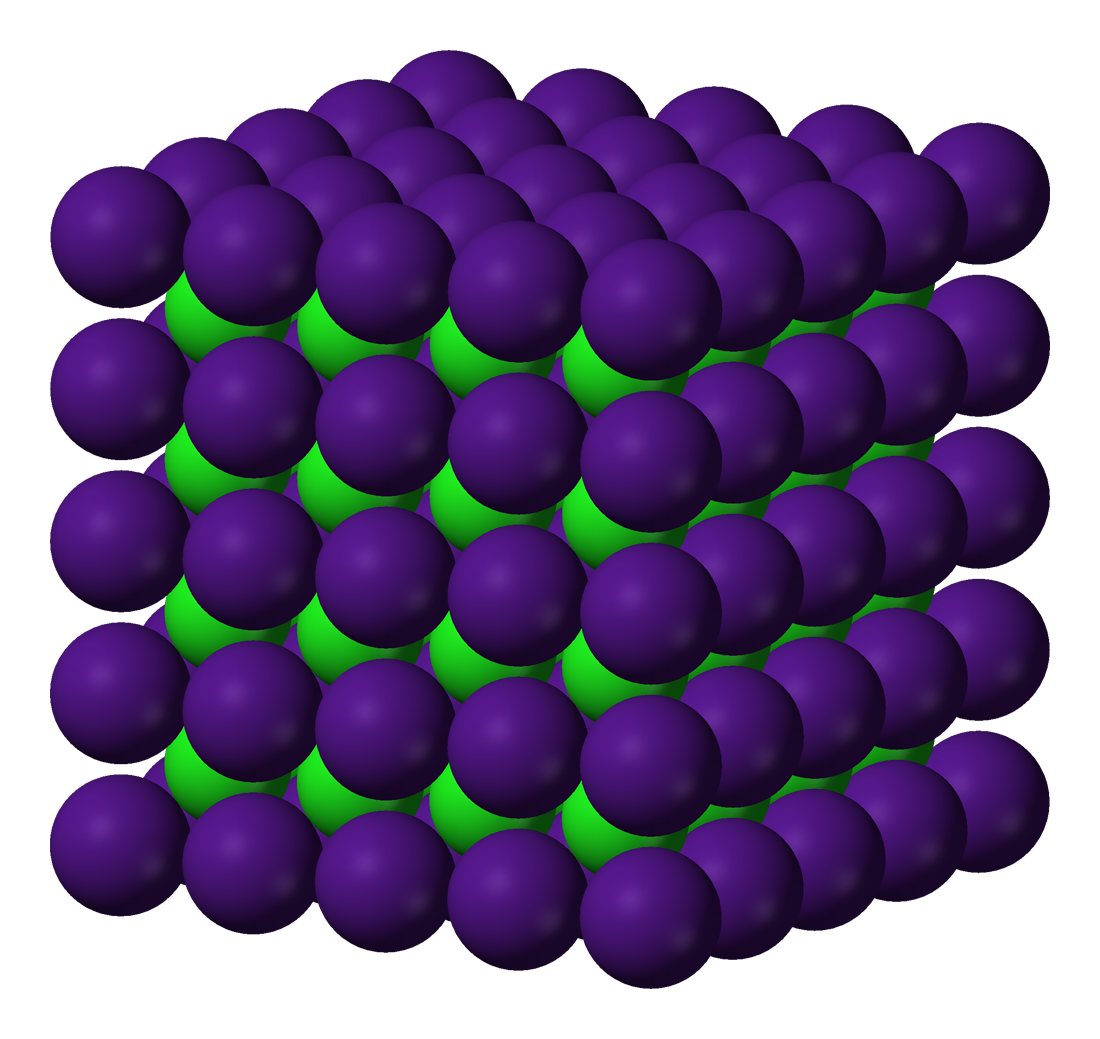

Names
- IUPAC name Caesium chloride
- Other names Cesium chloride

Identifiers
CAS Number	7647-17-8
3D model (JSmol)	Interactive image
ChemSpider	22713
ECHA InfoCard	100.028.728
EC Number	231-600-2
PubChem CID	24293
UNII	GNR9HML8BA
CompTox Dashboard (EPA)	DTXSID3040435
- InChI: InChI=1S/ClH.Cs/h1H;/q;+1/p-1 Key: AIYUHDOJVYHVIT-UHFFFAOYSA-M; InChI=1/ClH.Cs/h1H;/q;+1/p-1 Key: AIYUHDOJVYHWHXWOFAO
- SMILES: [Cs+].[Cl-]

Properties
Chemical formula	CsCl
Molar mass	168.36 g/mol
Appearance	white solid hygroscopic
Density	3.988 g/cm^{3}
Melting point	646 °C (1,195 °F; 919 K)
Boiling point	1,297 °C (2,367 °F; 1,570 K)
Solubility in water	1910 g/L (25 °C)
Solubility	soluble in ethanol
Band gap	8.35 eV (80 K)
Magnetic susceptibility (χ)	−56.7·10^{−6} cm^{3}/mol
Refractive index (n_{D})	1.712 (0.3 μm); 1.640 (0.59 μm); 1.631 (0.75 μm); 1.626 (1 μm); 1.616 (5 μm); 1.563 (20 μm)

Structure
Crystal structure	CsCl, cP2
Space group	Pm3̅m, No. 221
Lattice constant	a = 0.4119 nm
Lattice volume (V)	0.0699 nm^{3}
Formula units (Z)	1
Coordination geometry	Cubic (Cs^{+}); Cubic (Cl^{−})

Hazards
- GHS labelling
Pictograms	(GHS07: Exclamation mark) (GHS08: Health hazard)
Signal word	Warning
Hazard statements	H302, H341, H361, H373
Precautionary statements	P201, P202, P260, P264, P270, P281, P301+P312, P308+P313, P314, P330, P405, P501
- Lethal dose or concentration (LD, LC)
LD_{50} (median dose)	2600 mg/kg (oral, rat)

Related compounds
Other anions	Caesium fluoride Caesium bromide Caesium iodide Caesium astatide
Other cations	Lithium chloride Sodium chloride Potassium chloride Rubidium chloride Francium chloride
- Except where otherwise noted, data are given for materials in their standard state (at 25 °C [77 °F], 100 kPa). verify (what is ?) Infobox references

Caesium chloride or cesium chloride is the inorganic compound with the formula CsCl. This colorless salt is an important source of caesium ions in a variety of niche applications. Its crystal structure forms a major structural type where each caesium ion is coordinated by 8 chloride ions. Caesium chloride dissolves in water. CsCl changes to NaCl structure on heating. Caesium chloride occurs naturally as impurities in carnallite (up to 0.002%), sylvite and kainite. Less than 20 tonnes of CsCl is produced annually worldwide, mostly from a caesium-bearing mineral pollucite.

Caesium chloride is widely used in isopycnic centrifugation for separating various types of DNA. It is a reagent in analytical chemistry, where it is used to identify ions by the color and morphology of the precipitate. When enriched in radioisotopes, such as ^{137}CsCl or ^{131}CsCl, caesium chloride is used in nuclear medicine applications such as treatment of cancer and diagnosis of myocardial infarction. Another form of cancer treatment was studied using conventional non-radioactive CsCl. Whereas conventional caesium chloride has a rather low toxicity to humans and animals, the radioactive form easily contaminates the environment due to the high solubility of CsCl in water. Spread of ^{137}CsCl powder from a 93-gram container in 1987 in Goiânia, Brazil, resulted in one of the worst-ever radiation spill accidents killing four, including one child, and directly affecting 249 people.

== Crystal structure ==
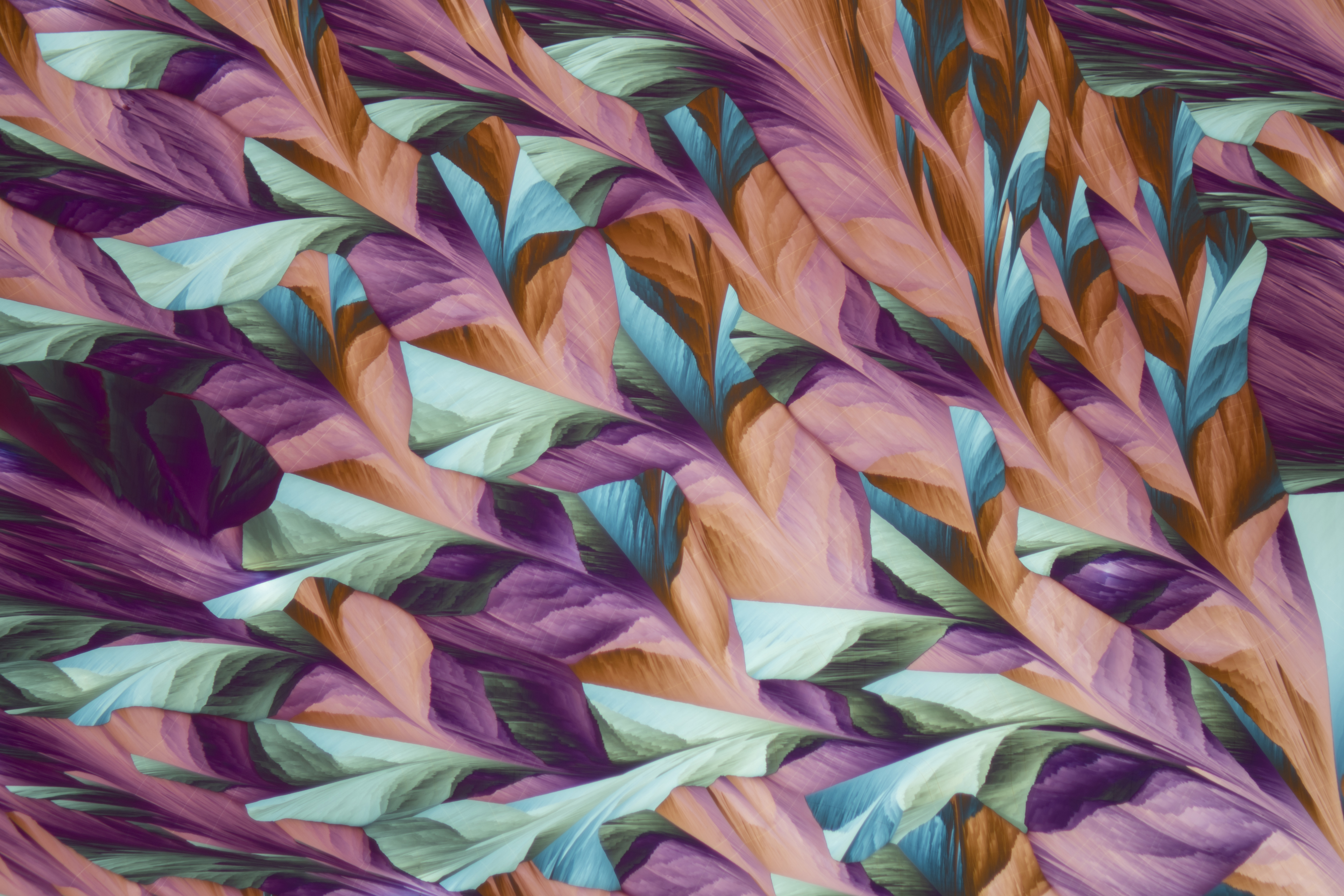
Thin crystalline film of caesium chloride imaged in compensated polarised light microscopy (Magnification x100)

The caesium chloride structure adopts a primitive cubic lattice with a two-atom basis, where both atoms have eightfold coordination. The chloride atoms lie upon the lattice points at the corners of the cube, while the caesium atoms lie in the holes in the center of the cubes; an alternative and exactly equivalent 'setting' has the caesium ions at the corners and the chloride ion in the center. This structure is shared with CsBr and CsI and many binary metallic alloys. In contrast, the other alkaline halides have the sodium chloride (rocksalt) structure. When both ions are similar in size (Cs^{+} ionic radius 174 pm for this coordination number, Cl^{−} 181 pm) the CsCl structure can be adopted, when they are different (Na^{+} ionic radius 102 pm, Cl^{−} 181 pm) the sodium chloride structure is adopted. Upon heating to above 445 °C, the normal caesium chloride structure (α-CsCl) converts to the β-CsCl form with the rocksalt structure (space group Fm3̅m). The rocksalt structure is also observed at ambient conditions in nanometer-thin CsCl films grown on mica, LiF, KBr and NaCl substrates.

== Physical properties ==
Caesium chloride is colorless in the form of large crystals and white when powdered. It readily dissolves in water with the maximum solubility increasing from 1865 g/L at 20 °C to 2705 g/L at 100 °C. The crystals are highly hygroscopic and deliquescent. Caesium chloride crystals gradually disintegrate at ambient conditions. Caesium chloride does not form hydrates.

Solubility of CsCl in water
θ /°C	0	10	20	25	30	40	50	60	70	80	90	100
S (wt%)	61.83	63.48	64.96	65.64	66.29	67.50	68.60	69.61	70.54	71.40	72.21	72.96

In contrast to sodium chloride and potassium chloride, caesium chloride readily dissolves in concentrated hydrochloric acid. Caesium chloride has also a relatively high solubility in formic acid (1077 g/L at 18 °C) and hydrazine; medium solubility in methanol (31.7 g/L at 25 °C) and low solubility in ethanol (7.6 g/L at 25 °C), sulfur dioxide (2.95 g/L at 25 °C), ammonia (3.8 g/L at 0 °C), acetone (0.004% at 18 °C), acetonitrile (0.083 g/L at 18 °C), ethylacetate and other complex ethers, butanone, acetophenone, pyridine and chlorobenzene.

Despite its wide band gap of about 8.35 eV at 80 K (−193.2 °C), caesium chloride weakly conducts electricity, and the conductivity is not electronic but ionic. The conductivity has a value of the order 10^{−7} S/cm at 300 °C. It occurs through nearest-neighbor jumps of lattice vacancies, and the mobility is much higher for the Cl^{−} than Cs^{+} vacancies. The conductivity increases with temperature up to about 450 °C, with an activation energy changing from 0.6 to 1.3 eV at about 260 °C. It then sharply drops by two orders of magnitude because of the phase transition from the α-CsCl to β-CsCl phase. The conductivity is also suppressed by application of pressure (about 10 times decrease at 0.4 GPa) which reduces the mobility of lattice vacancies.

Properties of aqueous solutions of CsCl at 20 °C
Concentration, wt%	Density, kg/L	Concentration, mol/L	refractive index (at 589 nm)	Freezing point depression, °C relative to water	Viscosity, 10^{−3} Pa·s
0.5	–	0.030	1.3334	0.10	1.000
1.0	1.0059	0.060	1.3337	0.20	0.997
2.0	1.0137	0.120	1.3345	0.40	0.992
3.0		0.182	1.3353	0.61	0.988
4.0	1.0296	0.245	1.3361	0.81	0.984
5.0		0.308	1.3369	1.02	0.980
6.0	1.0461	0.373	1.3377	1.22	0.977
7.0		0.438	1.3386	1.43	0.974
8.0	1.0629	0.505	1.3394	1.64	0.971
9.0		0.573	1.3403	1.85	0.969
10.0	1.0804	0.641	1.3412	2.06	0.966
12.0	1.0983	0.782	1.3430	2.51	0.961
14.0	1.1168	0.928	1.3448	2.97	0.955
16.0	1.1358	1.079	1.3468	3.46	0.950
18.0	1.1555	1.235	1.3487	3.96	0.945
20.0	1.1758	1.397	1.3507	4.49	0.939
22.0	1.1968	1.564	1.3528	–	0.934
24.0	1.2185	1.737	1.3550	–	0.930
26.0		1.917	1.3572	–	0.926
28.0		2.103	1.3594	–	0.924
30.0	1.2882	2.296	1.3617	–	0.922
32.0		2.497	1.3641	–	0.922
34.0		2.705	1.3666	–	0.924
36.0		2.921	1.3691	–	0.926
38.0		3.146	1.3717	–	0.930
40.0	1.4225	3.380	1.3744	–	0.934
42.0		3.624	1.3771	–	0.940
44.0		3.877	1.3800	–	0.947
46.0		4.142	1.3829	–	0.956
48.0		4.418	1.3860	–	0.967
50.0	1.5858	4.706	1.3892	–	0.981
60.0	1.7886	6.368	1.4076	–	1.120
64.0		7.163	1.4167	–	1.238

== Reactions ==
Caesium chloride completely dissociates upon dissolution in water, and the Cs^{+} cations are solvated in dilute solution. CsCl converts to caesium sulfate upon being heated in concentrated sulfuric acid or heated with caesium hydrogen sulfate at 550–700 °C:

2 CsCl + H_{2}SO_{4} → Cs_{2}SO_{4} + 2 HCl
CsCl + CsHSO_{4} → Cs_{2}SO_{4} + HCl

Caesium chloride forms a variety of double salts with other chlorides. Examples include 2CsCl·BaCl_{2}, 2CsCl·CuCl_{2}, CsCl·2CuCl and CsCl·LiCl, and with interhalogen compounds:

CsCl + ICl_{3} → Cs[ICl_{4}]

== Occurrence and production ==
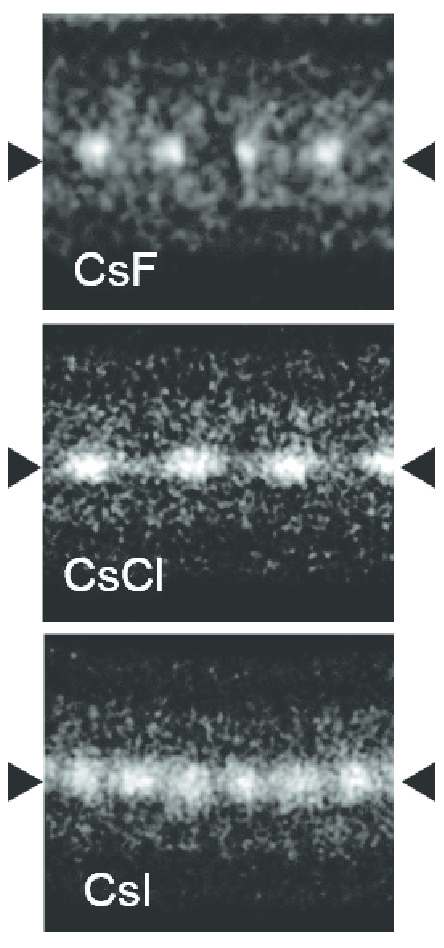
Monatomic caesium halide wires grown inside double-wall carbon nanotubes.

Caesium chloride occurs naturally as an impurity in the halide minerals carnallite (KMgCl_{3}·6H_{2}O with up to 0.002% CsCl), sylvite (KCl) and kainite (MgSO_{4}·KCl·3H_{2}O), and in mineral waters. For example, the water of Bad Dürkheim spa, which was used in isolation of caesium, contained about 0.17 mg/L of CsCl. None of these minerals are commercially important.

On industrial scale, CsCl is produced from the mineral pollucite, which is powdered and treated with hydrochloric acid at elevated temperature. The extract is treated with antimony chloride, iodine monochloride, or cerium(IV) chloride to give the poorly soluble double salt, e.g.:

CsCl + SbCl_{3} → CsSbCl_{4}

Treatment of the double salt with hydrogen sulfide gives CsCl:

2 CsSbCl_{4} + 3 H_{2}S → 2 CsCl + Sb_{2}S_{3} + 8 HCl

High-purity CsCl is also produced from recrystallized Cs[ICl_{2}] (and Cs[ICl_{4}]) by thermal decomposition:

Cs[ICl_{2}] → CsCl + ICl

Only about 20 tonnes of caesium compounds, with a major contribution from CsCl, were being produced annually around the 1970s and 2000s worldwide. Caesium chloride enriched with caesium-137 for radiation therapy applications is produced at a single facility Mayak in the Ural Region of Russia and is sold internationally through a UK dealer. The salt is synthesized at 200 °C because of its hygroscopic nature and sealed in a thimble-shaped steel container which is then enclosed into another steel casing. The sealing is required to protect the salt from moisture.

=== Laboratory methods ===
In the laboratory, CsCl can be obtained by treating caesium hydroxide, carbonate, caesium bicarbonate, or caesium sulfide with hydrochloric acid:

CsOH + HCl → CsCl + H_{2}O
Cs_{2}CO_{3} + 2 HCl → 2 CsCl + 2 H_{2}O + CO_{2}

== Uses ==
=== Precursor to Cs metal ===
Caesium chloride is the main precursor to caesium metal by high-temperature reduction:

2 CsCl(l) + Mg(l) → MgCl_{2}(s) + 2 Cs(g)
CsCl(l) + Li(l) → LiCl(l) + Cs(g)

A similar reaction – heating CsCl with calcium in vacuum in presence of phosphorus – was first reported in 1905 by the French chemist M. L. Hackspill and is still used industrially.

Caesium hydroxide is obtained by electrolysis of aqueous caesium chloride solution:

2 CsCl + 2 H_{2}O → 2 CsOH + Cl_{2} + H_{2}

=== Solute for ultracentrifugation ===
Caesium chloride is widely used in centrifugation in a technique known as isopycnic centrifugation. Centripetal and diffusive forces establish a density gradient that allow separation of mixtures on the basis of their molecular density. This technique allows separation of DNA of different densities (e.g. DNA fragments with differing A-T or G-C content). This application requires a solution with high density and yet relatively low viscosity, and CsCl suits it because of its high solubility in water, high density owing to the large mass of Cs, as well as low viscosity and high stability of CsCl solutions.

=== Organic chemistry ===
Caesium chloride is rarely used in organic chemistry. It can act as a phase transfer catalyst reagent in selected reactions. One of these reactions is the synthesis of glutamic acid derivatives

$$\overbrace{\ce{CH2=CHCOOCH3}}^\text{Methyl acrylate} + \ce{ArCH=N-CH(CH3)-COOC(CH3)3
->[\ce{TBAB,\ CsCl,\ K2CO3}][\ce{CPME,\ 0^\circ C}]
{ArCH=N-C(C2H4COOCH3)(CH3)-COOC(CH3)3}}$$

where TBAB is tetrabutylammonium bromide (interphase catalyst) and CPME is a cyclopentyl methyl ether (solvent).

Another reaction is substitution of tetranitromethane

$$\overbrace{\ce{C(NO2)4}}^\text{tetranitromethane} + \ce{CsCl ->[\ce{DMF}] {C(NO2)3Cl} + CsNO2}$$

where DMF is dimethylformamide (solvent).

=== Analytical chemistry ===
Caesium chloride is a reagent in traditional analytical chemistry used for detecting inorganic ions via the color and morphology of the precipitates. Quantitative concentration measurement of some of these ions, e.g. Mg^{2+}, with inductively coupled plasma mass spectrometry, is used to evaluate the hardness of water.

Ion	Accompanying reagents	Residue	Morphology	Detection limit (μg)
AsO_{3}^{3−}	KI	Cs_{2}AsI_{5} or Cs_{3}AsI_{6}	Red hexagons	0.01
Au^{3+}	AgCl, HCl	Cs_{2}Ag[AuCl_{6}]	Gray-black crosses, four and six-beamed stars	0.01
Au^{3+}	NH_{4}SCN	CsAu(SCN)_{4}	Orange-yellow needles	0.4
Bi^{3+}	KI, HCl	Cs_{2}BiI_{5} or 2.5H_{2}O	Red hexagons	0.13
Cu^{2+}	(CH_{3}COO)_{2}Pb, CH_{3}COOH, KNO_{2}	Cs_{2}Pb[Cu(NO_{2})_{6}]	Small black cubes	0.01
In^{3+}	—	Cs_{3}InCl_{6}	Small octahedra	0.02
[IrCl_{6}]^{3−}	—	Cs_{2}IrCl_{6}	Small dark-red octahedra	–
Mg^{2+}	Na_{2}HPO_{4}	CsMgPO_{4} or 6H_{2}O	Small tetrahedra	–
Pb^{2+}	KI	Cs[PbI_{3}]	Yellow-green needles	0.01
Pd^{2+}	NaBr	Cs_{2}[PdBr_{4}]	Dark-red needles and prisms	–
ReCl_{4}^{−}	—	CsReCl_{4}	Dark-red rhombs, bipyramids	0.2
ReCl_{6}^{2−}	—	Cs_{2}ReCl_{6}	Small yellow-green octahedra	0.5
ReO_{4}^{−}	—	CsReO_{4}	Tetragonal bipyramids	0.13
Rh^{3+}	KNO_{2}	Cs_{3}[Rh(NO_{2})_{6}]	Yellow cubes	0.1
Ru^{3+}	—	Cs_{3}RuCl_{6}	Pink needles	–
RuCl_{6}^{2−}	—	Cs_{2}RuCl_{6}	Small dark-red crystals	0.8
Sb^{3+}	—	Cs_{2}SbCl_{5}·nH_{2}O	Hexagons	0.16
Sb^{3+}	NaI	CsSbI_{4} or Cs_{2}SbI_{5}	Red hexagons	0.1
Sn^{4+}	—	Cs_{2}SnCl_{6}	Small octahedra	0.2
TeO_{3}^{3−}	HCl	Cs_{2}TeCl_{6}	Light yellow octahedra	0.3
Tl^{3+}	NaI	CsTlI_{4}	Orange-red hexagons or rectangles	0.06

It is also used for detection of the following ions:

Ion	Accompanying reagents	Detection	Detection limit (μg/mL)
Al^{3+}	K_{2}SO_{4}	Colorless crystals form in neutral media after evaporation	0.01
Ga^{3+}	KHSO_{4}	Colorless crystals form upon heating	0.5
Cr^{3+}	KHSO_{4}	Pale-violet crystals precipitate in slightly acidic media	0.06

=== Medicine ===
The American Cancer Society states that "available scientific evidence does not support claims that non-radioactive cesium chloride supplements have any effect on tumors." The Food and Drug Administration has warned about safety risks, including significant heart toxicity and death, associated with the use of caesium chloride in naturopathic medicine.

=== Nuclear medicine and radiography ===
Caesium chloride composed of radioisotopes such as ^{137}CsCl and ^{131}CsCl, is used in nuclear medicine, including treatment of cancer (brachytherapy) and diagnosis of myocardial infarction. In the production of radioactive sources, it is normal to choose a chemical form of the radioisotope which would not be readily dispersed in the environment in the event of an accident. For instance, radiothermal generators (RTGs) often use strontium titanate, which is insoluble in water. For teletherapy sources, however, the radioactive density (Ci in a given volume) needs to be very high, which is not possible with known insoluble caesium compounds. A thimble-shaped container of radioactive caesium chloride provides the active source.

=== Miscellaneous applications ===
Caesium chloride is used in the preparation of electrically conducting glasses and screens of cathode ray tubes. In conjunction with rare gases CsCl is used in excimer lamps and excimer lasers. Other uses include activation of electrodes in welding; manufacture of mineral water, beer and drilling muds; and high-temperature solders. High-quality CsCl single crystals have a wide transparency range from UV to the infrared and therefore had been used for cuvettes, prisms and windows in optical spectrometers; this use was discontinued with the development of less hygroscopic materials.

CsCl is a potent inhibitor of HCN channels, which carry the h-current in excitable cells such as neurons. Therefore, it can be useful in electrophysiology experiments in neuroscience.

== Toxicity ==
Caesium chloride has a low toxicity to humans and animals. Its median lethal dose (LD_{50}) in mice is 2300 mg per kilogram of body weight for oral administration and 910 mg/kg for intravenous injection. The mild toxicity of CsCl is related to its ability to lower the concentration of potassium in the body and partly substitute it in biochemical processes. When taken in large quantities, however, it can cause a significant imbalance in potassium and lead to hypokalemia, arrhythmia, and acute cardiac arrest. However, caesium chloride powder can irritate the mucous membranes and cause asthma.

Because of its high solubility in water, caesium chloride is highly mobile and can even diffuse through concrete. This is a drawback for its radioactive form which urges a search for less chemically mobile radioisotope materials. Commercial sources of radioactive caesium chloride are well sealed in a double steel enclosure. However, in the Goiânia accident in Brazil, such a source containing about 93 grams of ^{137}CsCl, was taken from an abandoned hospital and forced open by two scavengers. The blue glow emitted in the dark by the radioactive caesium chloride attracted the scavengers and their relatives who were unaware of the associated dangers and spread the powder. This resulted in one of the worst radiation spill accidents in which 4 people died within a month from the exposure, 20 showed signs of radiation sickness, 249 people were contaminated with radioactive caesium chloride, and about a thousand received a dose exceeding a yearly amount of background radiation. More than 110,000 people overwhelmed the local hospitals, and several city blocks had to be demolished in the cleanup operations. In the first days of the contamination, stomach disorders and nausea due to radiation sickness were experienced by several people, but only after several days one person associated the symptoms with the powder and brought a sample to the authorities.

== See also ==
- List of ineffective cancer treatments

== Bibliography ==
- Haynes, William M., ed. (2011). CRC Handbook of Chemistry and Physics (92nd ed.). Boca Raton, Florida: CRC Press. ISBN 1-4398-5511-0.
- Lidin, R. A; Andreeva, L. L.; Molochko V. A. (2006). Константы неорганических веществ: справочник (Inorganic compounds: data book). Moscow. ISBN 978-5-7107-8085-5.
- Plyushchev, V. E.; Stepin, B. D. (1970). Химия и технология соединений лития, рубидия и цезия [Chemistry and Technology of Lithium, Rubidium and Caesium Compounds] (in Russian). Moscow: Khimiya.
