= Sodium iodide =

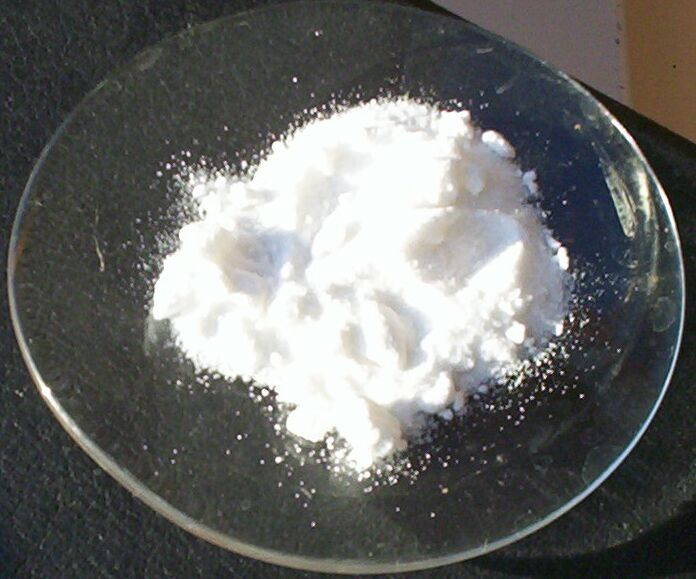
Sodium iodide
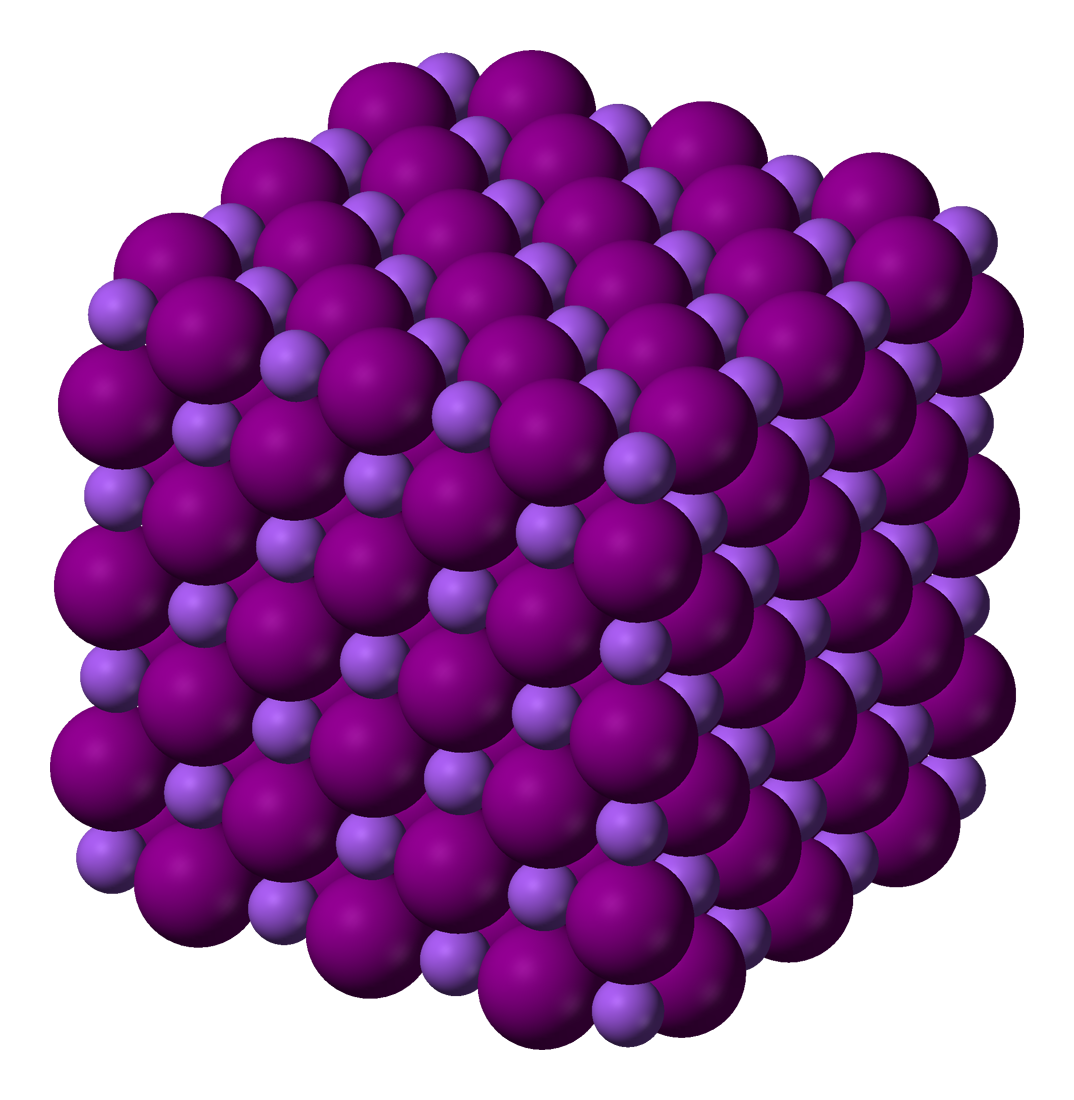
Sodium iodide
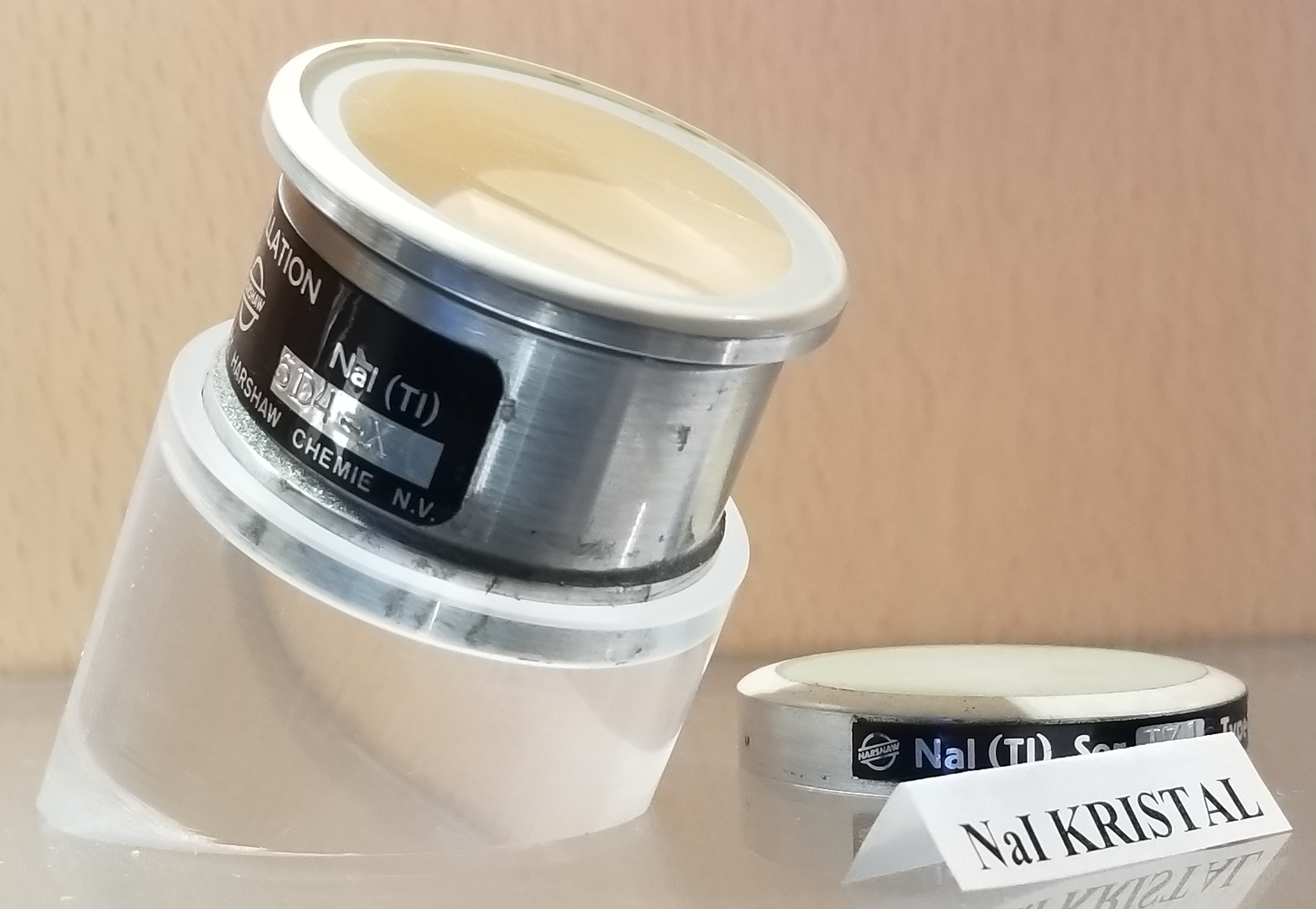
- NaI(Tl) scintillators

Identifiers
| CAS Number | 7681-82-5; 13517-06-1 (dihydrate) |
| 3D model (JSmol) | Interactive image |
| ChEBI | CHEBI:33167 |
| ChEMBL | ChEMBL1644695 |
| ChemSpider | 5048 |
| ECHA InfoCard | 100.028.800 |
| PubChem CID | 5238 |
| RTECS number | WB6475000 |
| UNII | F5WR8N145C |
| CompTox Dashboard (EPA) | DTXSID2041125 |
- InChI: InChI=1S/HI.Na/h1H;/q;+1/p-1 Key: FVAUCKIRQBBSSJ-UHFFFAOYSA-M; InChI=1/HI.Na/h1H;/q;+1/p-1 Key: FVAUCKIRQBBSSJ-REWHXWOFAL
- SMILES: [Na+].[I-]

Properties
| Chemical formula | NaI |
| Molar mass | 149.894 g/mol |
| Appearance | white solid deliquescent |
| Odor | odorless |
| Density | 3.67 g cm^{−3} |
| Melting point | 661 °C (1,222 °F; 934 K) |
| Boiling point | 1,304 °C (2,379 °F; 1,577 K) |
| Solubility in water | 1587 g/L (0 °C); 1842 g/L (25 °C); 2278 g/L (50 °C); 2940 g/L (70 °C); 3020 g/L (100 °C) |
| Solubility | ethanol, acetone |
| Band gap | 5.89 eV |
| Magnetic susceptibility (χ) | −57×10^{−6} cm^{3} mol^{−1} |
| Refractive index (n_{D}) | 1.93 (300 nm); 1.774 (589 nm); 1.71 (10 μm) |

Structure
| Crystal structure | Halite, cF8 |
| Space group | Fm3̅m, No. 225 |
| Lattice constant | a = 0.6462 nm |
| Formula units (Z) | 4 |
| Coordination geometry | Octahedral |

Thermochemistry
| Heat capacity (C) | 52.1 J mol^{−1} K^{−1} |
| Std molar entropy (S^{⦵}_{298}) | 98.5 J mol^{−1} K^{−1} |
| Std enthalpy of formation (Δ_{f}H^{⦵}_{298}) | −287.8 kJ mol^{−1} |
| Gibbs free energy (Δ_{f}G^{⦵}) | −286.1 kJ mol^{−1} |

Hazards
- Occupational safety and health (OHS/OSH)
| Main hazards | Irritant, can harm the unborn child |
- GHS labelling
| Pictograms | (GHS07: Exclamation mark) (GHS09: Environmental hazard) |
| Signal word | Danger |
| Hazard statements | H315, H319, H400 |
| Precautionary statements | P273, P305+P351+P338 |
| NFPA 704 (fire diamond) | 1 0 1 |
| Flash point | Non-flammable |
- Safety data sheet (SDS)

Related compounds
| Other anions | Sodium fluoride Sodium chloride Sodium bromide Sodium astatide |
| Other cations | Lithium iodide Potassium iodide Rubidium iodide Caesium iodide Francium iodide |
- Except where otherwise noted, data are given for materials in their standard state (at 25 °C [77 °F], 100 kPa). verify (what is ?) Infobox references

Sodium iodide (chemical formula NaI) is an ionic compound formed from the chemical reaction of sodium metal and iodine. Under standard conditions, it is a white, water-soluble solid comprising a 1:1 mix of sodium cations (Na^{+}) and iodide anions (I^{−}) in a crystal lattice. It is used mainly as a nutritional supplement and in organic chemistry. It is produced industrially as the salt formed when acidic iodides react with sodium hydroxide. It is a chaotropic salt.

== Uses ==
=== Food supplement ===
Sodium iodide, as well as potassium iodide, is commonly used to treat and prevent iodine deficiency. Iodized table salt contains 10 ppm iodide.

=== Organic synthesis ===
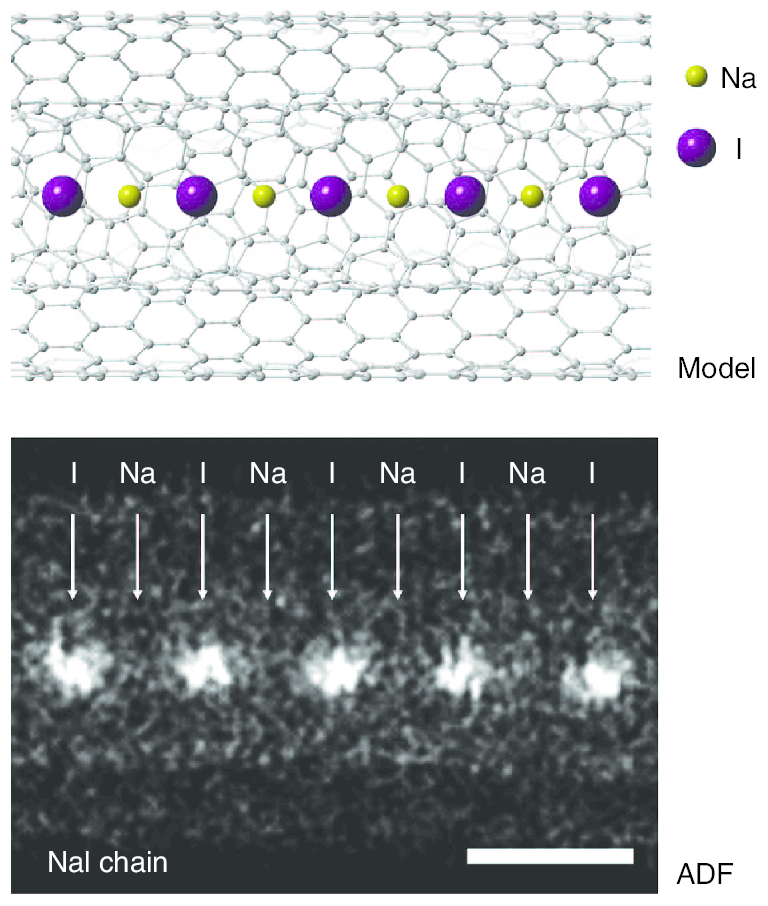
Monatomic NaI chains grown inside double-wall carbon nanotubes.

Sodium iodide is used for conversion of alkyl chlorides into alkyl iodides. This method, the Finkelstein reaction, relies on the insolubility of sodium chloride in acetone to drive the reaction:

R–Cl + NaI → R–I + NaCl

=== Nuclear medicine ===
Some radioactive iodide salts of sodium, including Na^{125}I and Na^{131}I, have radiopharmaceutical uses for thyroid cancer and hyperthyroidism or as radioactive tracer in imaging (see Isotopes of iodine > Radioiodines I-123, I-124, I-125, and I-131 in medicine and biology).

=== Thallium-doped NaI(Tl) scintillators ===
Sodium iodide activated with thallium, NaI(Tl), when subjected to ionizing radiation, emits photons (i.e., scintillate) and is used in scintillation detectors, traditionally in nuclear medicine, geophysics, nuclear physics, and environmental measurements. NaI(Tl) is the most widely used scintillation material. The crystals are usually coupled with a photomultiplier tube, in a hermetically sealed assembly, as sodium iodide is hygroscopic. Fine-tuning of some parameters (i.e., radiation hardness, afterglow, transparency) can be achieved by varying the conditions of the crystal growth. Crystals with a higher level of doping are used in X-ray detectors with high spectrometric quality. Sodium iodide can be used both as single crystals and as polycrystals for this purpose. The wavelength of maximum emission is 415 nm.

=== Radiocontrast ===
António Egas Moniz searched for a radiocontrast agent for cerebral angiography. After experiments on rabbits and dogs he settled upon sodium iodide as the best medium.

== Solubility data ==
Sodium iodide exhibits high solubility in some organic solvents, unlike sodium chloride or even bromide:

| Solvent | Solubility of NaI (g NaI/kg of solvent at 25 °C) |
|---|---|
| H_{2}O | 1842 |
| Liquid ammonia | 1620 |
| Liquid sulfur dioxide | 150 |
| Methanol | 625–830 |
| Formic acid | 618 |
| Acetonitrile | 249 |
| Acetone | 504 |
| Formamide | 570–850 |
| Acetamide | 323 (41.5 °C) |
| Dimethylformamide | 37–64 |
| Dichloromethane | 0.09 |

== Stability ==
Iodides (including sodium iodide) are detectably oxidized by atmospheric oxygen (O_{2}) to molecular iodine (I_{2}). I_{2} and I^{−} complex to form the triiodide complex, which has a yellow color, unlike the white color of sodium iodide. Water accelerates the oxidation process, and iodide can also produce I_{2} by photooxidation, therefore for maximum stability sodium iodide should be stored under dark, low temperature, low humidity conditions.

== See also ==
- Gamma spectroscopy
- Scintillation counter
- Teratology

== Cited sources ==
- Haynes, William M., ed. (2016). CRC Handbook of Chemistry and Physics (97th ed.). CRC Press. p. 4.49. ISBN 9781498754293.
