= Caesium tribromide =

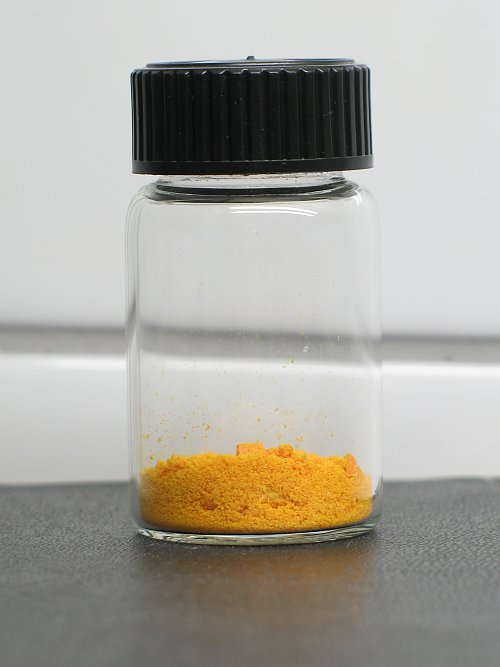

Identifiers
CAS Number	17060-10-5
3D model (JSmol)	Interactive image
ChemSpider	21427776
ECHA InfoCard	100.149.967
EC Number	621-081-4
PubChem CID	25021397
CompTox Dashboard (EPA)	DTXSID501312899
- InChI: InChI=1S/Br3.Cs/c1-3-2;/q-1;+1 Key: AUOXCQZELVDUNB-UHFFFAOYSA-N
- SMILES: Br[Br-]Br.[Cs+]

Properties
Chemical formula	CsBr_{3}
Molar mass	372.617 g·mol^{−1}
Appearance	Orange solid; Dark red crystals
Melting point	38 °C (decomposes)

Hazards
- GHS labelling
Pictograms	(GHS07: Exclamation mark)
Signal word	Warning
Hazard statements	H315, H319, H335
Precautionary statements	P261, P264, P264+P265, P271, P280, P302+P352, P304+P340, P305+P351+P338, P319, P321, P332+P317, P337+P317, P362+P364, P403+P233, P405, P501
- Except where otherwise noted, data are given for materials in their standard state (at 25 °C [77 °F], 100 kPa). Infobox references

Caesium tribromide is an inorganic compound with chemical formula Cs^{+}[Br_{3}]^{−}. It can be obtained by crystallization from a concentrated aqueous solution of caesium bromide containing large amounts of bromine, or by the hydrothermal reaction of caesium bromide, caesium bromate, and hydrobromic acid, in which bromine is generated in situ.

It is isostructural with caesium triiodide and caesium diiodide bromide, and belongs to the orthorhombic Pmnb space group.

It can oxidize some Au(I) complexes to Au(II) or Au(III) complexes.
