= Lithium iodide =

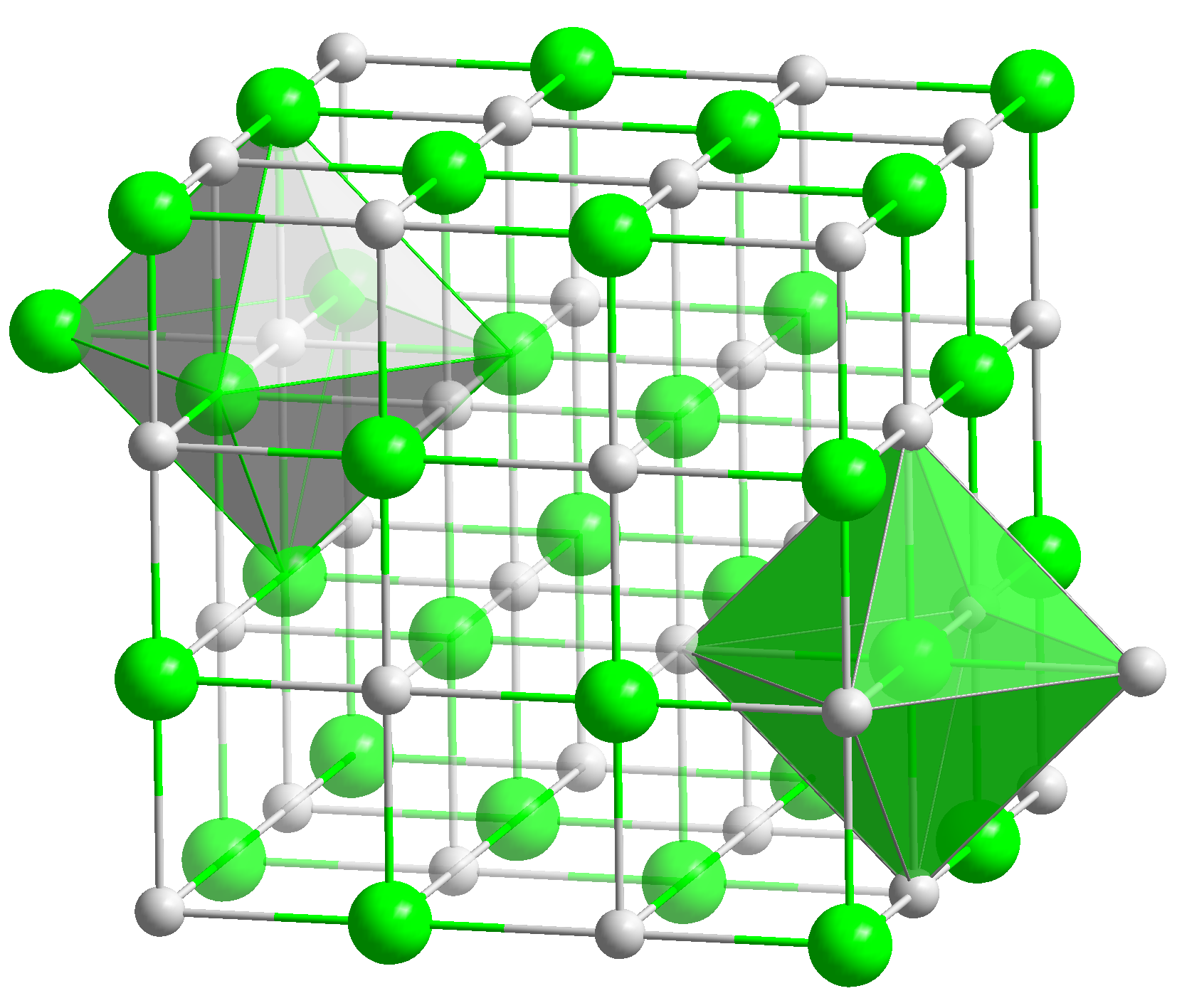
- Lithium iodide __ Li^{+} __ I^{−}

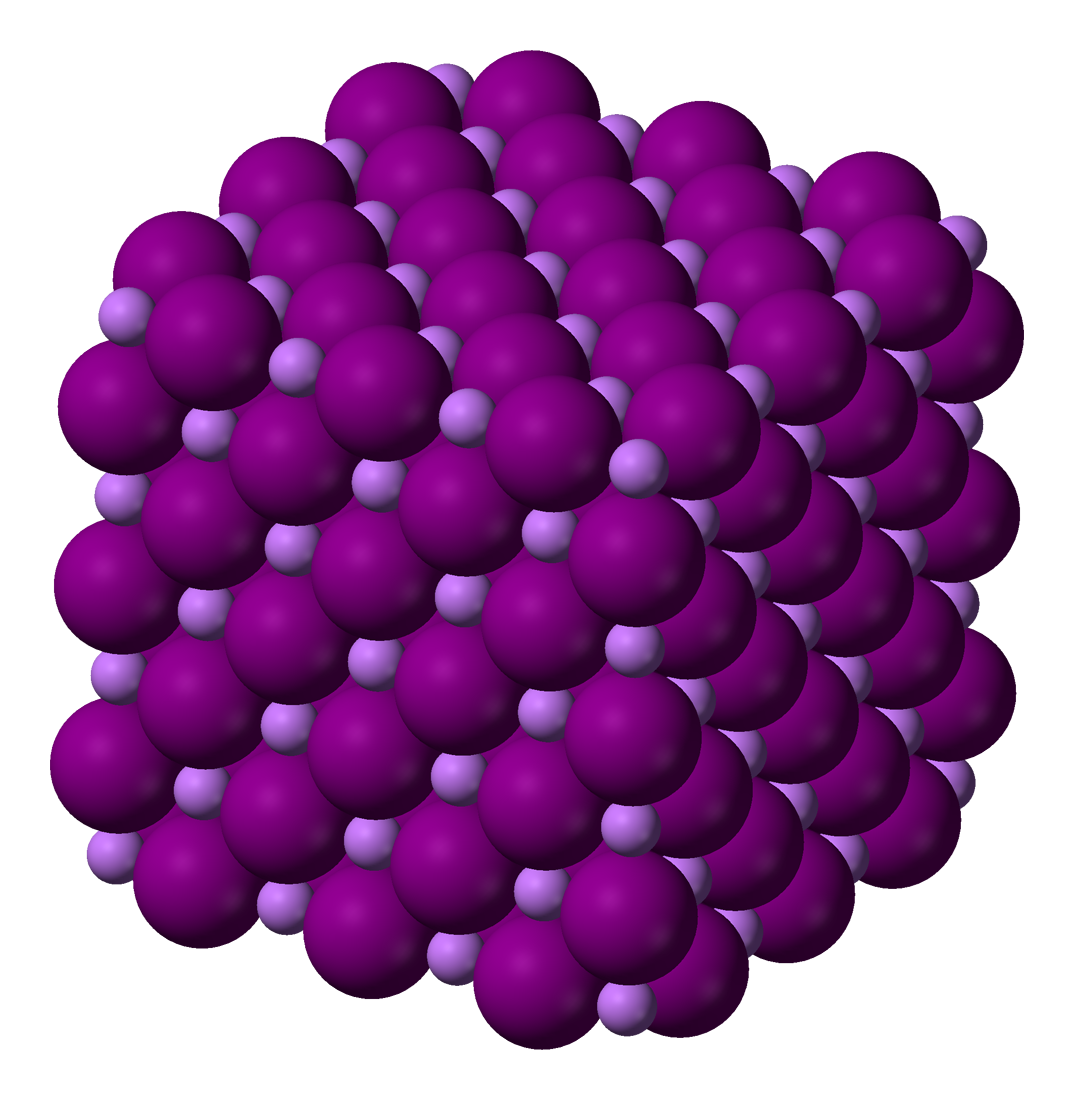

Identifiers
CAS Number	10377-51-2; 17023-24-4 (monohydrate); 17023-25-5 (dihydrate); 7790-22-9 (trihydrate)
3D model (JSmol)	Interactive image
ChemSpider	59699
ECHA InfoCard	100.030.735
PubChem CID	66321
UNII	S6K2XET783; PS8215OJNR (trihydrate)
CompTox Dashboard (EPA)	DTXSID30908580
- InChI: InChI=1S/HI.Li/h1H;/q;+1/p-1 Key: HSZCZNFXUDYRKD-UHFFFAOYSA-M; InChI=1/HI.Li/h1H;/q;+1/p-1 Key: HSZCZNFXUDYRKD-REWHXWOFAM
- SMILES: [Li+].[I-]

Properties
Chemical formula	LiI
Molar mass	133.85 g/mol
Appearance	White crystalline solid
Density	4.076 g/cm^{3} (anhydrous); 3.494 g/cm^{3} (trihydrate)
Melting point	469 °C (876 °F; 742 K)
Boiling point	1,171 °C (2,140 °F; 1,444 K)
Solubility in water	1510 g/L (0 °C); 1670 g/L (25 °C); 4330 g/L (100 °C)
Solubility	soluble in ethanol, propanol, ethanediol, ammonia
Solubility in methanol	3430 g/L (20 °C)
Solubility in acetone	426 g/L (18 °C)
Magnetic susceptibility (χ)	−50.0×10^{−6} cm^{3}/mol
Refractive index (n_{D})	1.955

Thermochemistry
Heat capacity (C)	54.4 J mol^{−1} K^{−1}
Std molar entropy (S^{⦵}_{298})	75.7 J mol^{−1} K^{−1}
Std enthalpy of formation (Δ_{f}H^{⦵}_{298})	−270.48 kJ/mol
Gibbs free energy (Δ_{f}G^{⦵})	−266.9 kJ/mol

Hazards
NFPA 704 (fire diamond)	2 0 0
Flash point	Non-flammable
Safety data sheet (SDS)	External MSDS

Related compounds
Other anions	Lithium fluoride Lithium chloride Lithium bromide Lithium astatide
Other cations	Sodium iodide Potassium iodide Rubidium iodide Caesium iodide Francium iodide
- Except where otherwise noted, data are given for materials in their standard state (at 25 °C [77 °F], 100 kPa). verify (what is ?) Infobox references

Lithium iodide, or LiI, is a compound of lithium and iodine. When exposed to air, it becomes yellow in color, due to the oxidation of iodide to iodine. It crystallizes in the NaCl motif. It can participate in various hydrates.

== Applications ==
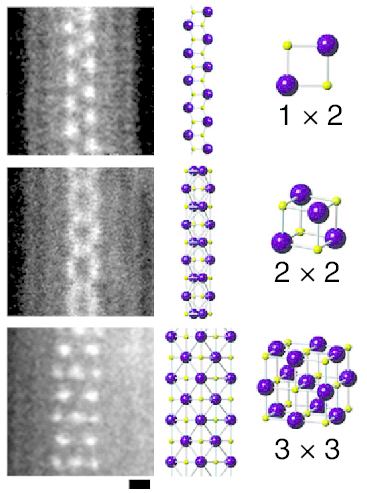
LiI chains grown inside double-wall carbon nanotubes.

Lithium iodide is used as a solid-state electrolyte for high-temperature batteries. It is also the standard electrolyte in artificial pacemakers due to the long cycle life it enables. The solid is used as a phosphor for neutron detection. It is also used, in a complex with Iodine, in the electrolyte of dye-sensitized solar cells.

In organic synthesis, LiI is useful for cleaving C-O bonds. For example, it can be used to convert methyl esters to carboxylic acids:

RCO_{2}CH_{3} + LiI → RCO_{2}Li + CH_{3}I

Similar reactions apply to epoxides and aziridines.

Lithium iodide was used as a radiocontrast agent for CT scans. Its use was discontinued due to renal toxicity. Inorganic iodine solutions suffered from hyperosmolarity and high viscosities. Current iodinated contrast agents are organoiodine compounds.

It is also useful in MALDI imaging mass spectrometry of lipids by adding lithium salts to the matrix solution.

== See also ==
- Lithium battery
