= Triiodide =

Ion

Skeletal formula of triiodide
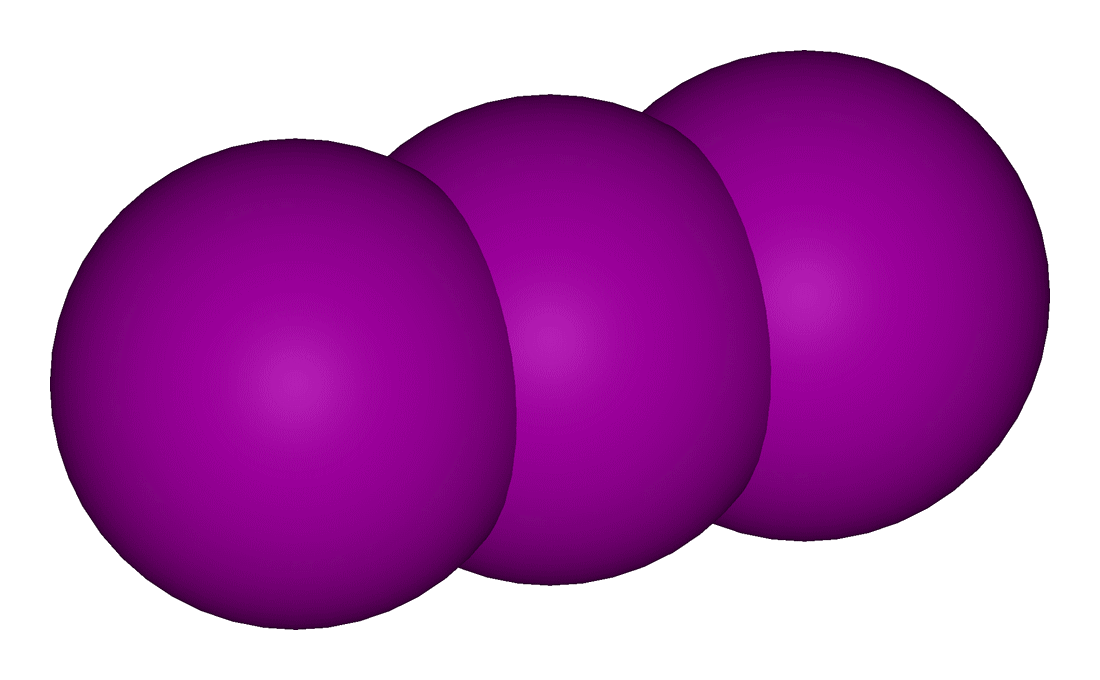
Spacefill model of triiodide

Names
- IUPAC name Triiodide anion

Identifiers
CAS Number	14900-04-0
3D model (JSmol)	Interactive image
ChEMBL	ChEMBL1233501
ChemSpider	94786
PubChem CID	105054
UNII	DA1N05631Q
CompTox Dashboard (EPA)	DTXSID40164150
- InChI: InChI=1S/I3/c1-3-2/q-1 Key: WRTMQOHKMFDUKX-UHFFFAOYSA-N
- SMILES: I[I-]I

Properties
Chemical formula	I_{3}^{−}
Molar mass	380.71396 g·mol^{−1}
- Except where otherwise noted, data are given for materials in their standard state (at 25 °C [77 °F], 100 kPa). Infobox references

In chemistry, triiodide usually refers to the triiodide ion, I_{3}^{−}. This anion, one of the polyhalogen ions, is composed of three iodine atoms. It is formed by combining aqueous solutions of iodide salts and iodine. Some salts of the anion have been isolated, including thallium(I) triiodide (Tl^{+}[I_{3}]^{−}) and ammonium triiodide ([NH_{4}]^{+}[I_{3}]^{−}). Triiodide is observed to be a red colour in solution.

== Nomenclature ==
Other chemical compounds with "triiodide" in their name contain three separate or independent iodide centers rather than a single unit that consists of three iodine atoms. The prefix "tri" in that situation is a multiplicative prefix for iodide—a 3:1 stoichiometric ratio—rather than part of the name of the unified three-iodine structure. Examples include nitrogen triiodide (NI_{3}) and phosphorus triiodide (PI_{3}), each of which have a central atom to which each of the three iodine atoms is bonded. To clarify the structural nature of a chemical with three iodides, other naming schemes can be used. Typical options are to use tris as an alternative prefix, such as the chemical thallium tris(iodide), where there three "iodide" units, as distinct from the chemical thallium(I) triiodide, where thallium is oxidation state +1 and therefore "triiodide" is the single monovalent unit.

== Preparation ==
The following exergonic equilibrium gives rise to the triiodide ion:

I_{2} + I^{−} ⇌ I_{3}^{−}

In this reaction, iodide is viewed as a Lewis base, and the iodine is a Lewis acid. The process is analogous to the reaction of S_{8} with sodium sulfide (which forms polysulfides) except that the higher polyiodides have branched structures.

== Structure and bonding ==
The ion is linear and symmetrical. According to valence shell electron pair repulsion theory, the central iodine atom has three equatorial lone pairs, and the terminal iodine atoms are bonded axially in a linear fashion, due to the three lone pairs bonding to the central iodine-atom. In the molecular orbital model, a common explanation for the hypervalent bonding on the central iodine involves a three-center four-electron bond. The I−I bond is longer than in diatomic iodine, I_{2}.

In ionic compounds, the bond lengths and angles of triiodide vary depending on the nature of the cation. The triiodide anion is easily polarised and in many salts, one I−I bond becomes shorter than the other. Only in combination with large cations, e.g. a quaternary ammonium such as [N(CH_{3})_{4}]^{+}, may the triiodide remain roughly symmetrical.

In solution phase, the bond lengths and angles of triiodide vary depending on the nature of solvent. The protic solvents tend to localize the triiodide anion's excess charge, resulting in the triiodide anion's asymmetric structure. For example, the triiodide anion in methanol has an asymmetric bent structure with a charge localized on the longer end of the anion.

The dimensions of the triiodide [I_{a}−I_{b}−I_{c}]^{−} bonds in a few sample compounds are shown below:

compound	I_{a}−I_{b} (pm)	I_{b}−I_{c} (pm)	angle (°)
TlI_{3}	306.3	282.6	177.9
RbI_{3}	305.1	283.3	178.11
CsI_{3}	303.8	284.2	178.00
NH_{4}I_{3}	311.4	279.7	178.55
I_{3}^{−} (in methanol)	309.0	296.0	152.0

== Properties ==
The triiodide ion is the simplest polyiodide; several higher polyiodides exist. In solution, it appears yellow in low concentrations, and brown at higher concentrations. The triiodide ion is responsible for the well-known blue-black color which arises when iodine solutions interact with starch. Iodide does not react with starch; nor do solutions of iodine in nonpolar solvents.

Lugol's iodine contains potassium iodide and a stoichiometric amount of elemental iodine, so that significant amounts of triiodide ion exist in this solution. Tincture of iodine, although nominally a solution of elemental iodine in ethanol, also contains significant amounts of triiodide, due to its content of both iodide and water.

=== Photochemistry ===
Triiodide is a model system in photochemistry. Its reaction mechanism has been studied in gas phase, solution and the solid state. In gas phase, the reaction proceeds in multiple pathways that include iodine molecule, metastable ions and iodine radicals as photoproducts, which are formed by two-body and three-body dissociation. In condensed phases, due to confinement, geminate recombination is more common. In solution, only two-body dissociation of triiodide has been observed. In the protic solvents, an iodine atom at the shorter end of the triiodide anion dissociates upon photoexcitation showing two-body dissociation. In the solid state, the triiodide photochemistry has been studied in compounds involving quaternary ammonium cations, such as tetrabutylammonium triiodide. It has been shown that the solid state photoreaction mechanism depends on the light wavelength, yielding fast recovery in a few picoseconds or going through a two-stage process that involves the formation and break-up of a tetraiodide intermediate on longer timescales. Besides, triiodide photochemistry is an important contributor in the environmental cycle of iodine. Because of the presence of heavy iodine atoms and the well-calibrated chemical pathways, triiodide has also become a computational benchmark system for relativistic quantum chemistry.

=== Electrochemistry ===
The redox reactions of triiodide and iodide has been proposed as critical steps in dye-sensitized solar cells. and rechargeable batteries.

== See also ==
- Polyiodide
- Tribromide
- Polyhalogen ions
- Three-center four-electron bond
- Iodine–starch test
- Iodometry
- Povidone-iodine
- Lugol's iodine
- Dye-sensitized solar cell
- Organic superconductor
