= Rubidium iodide =

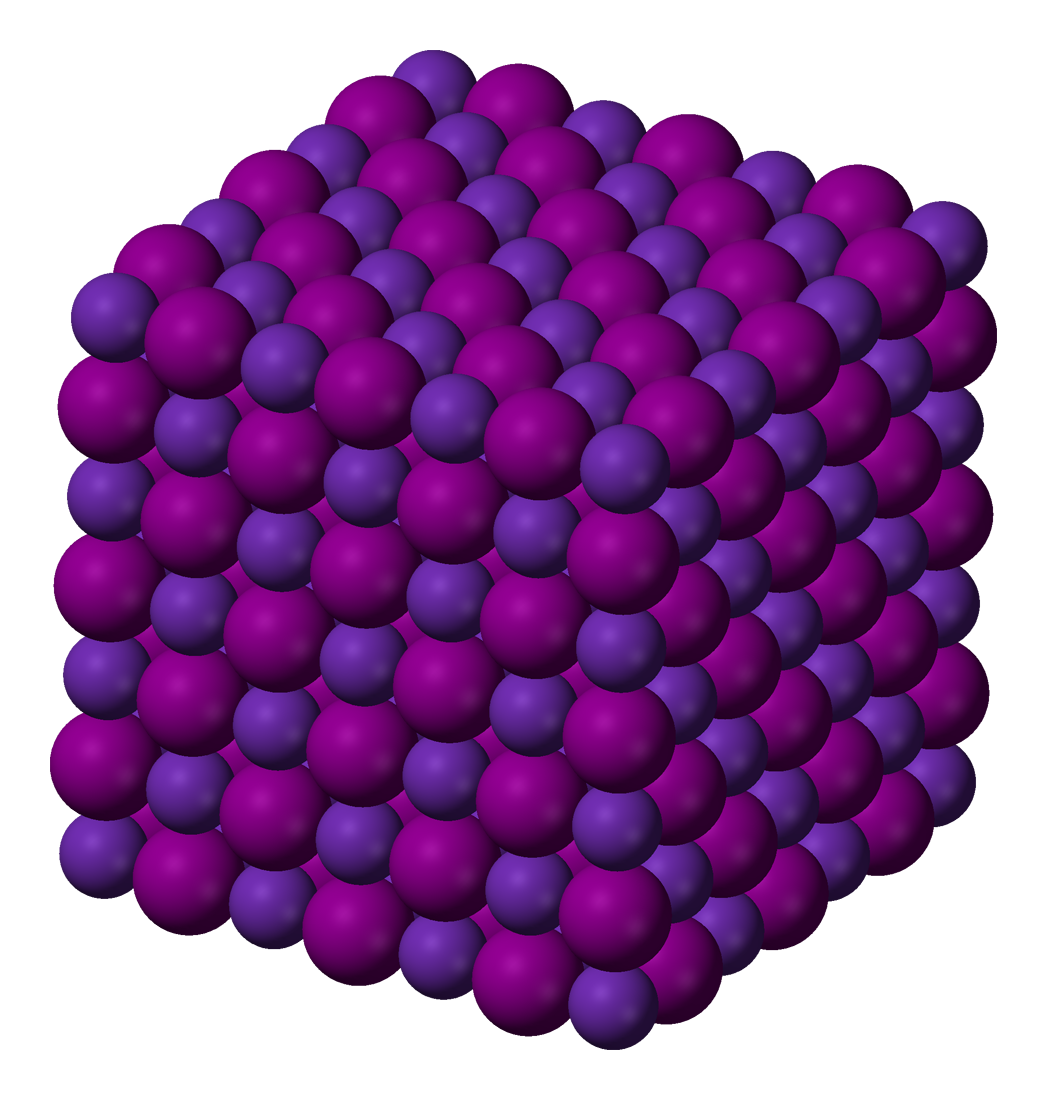
- Rubidium iodide

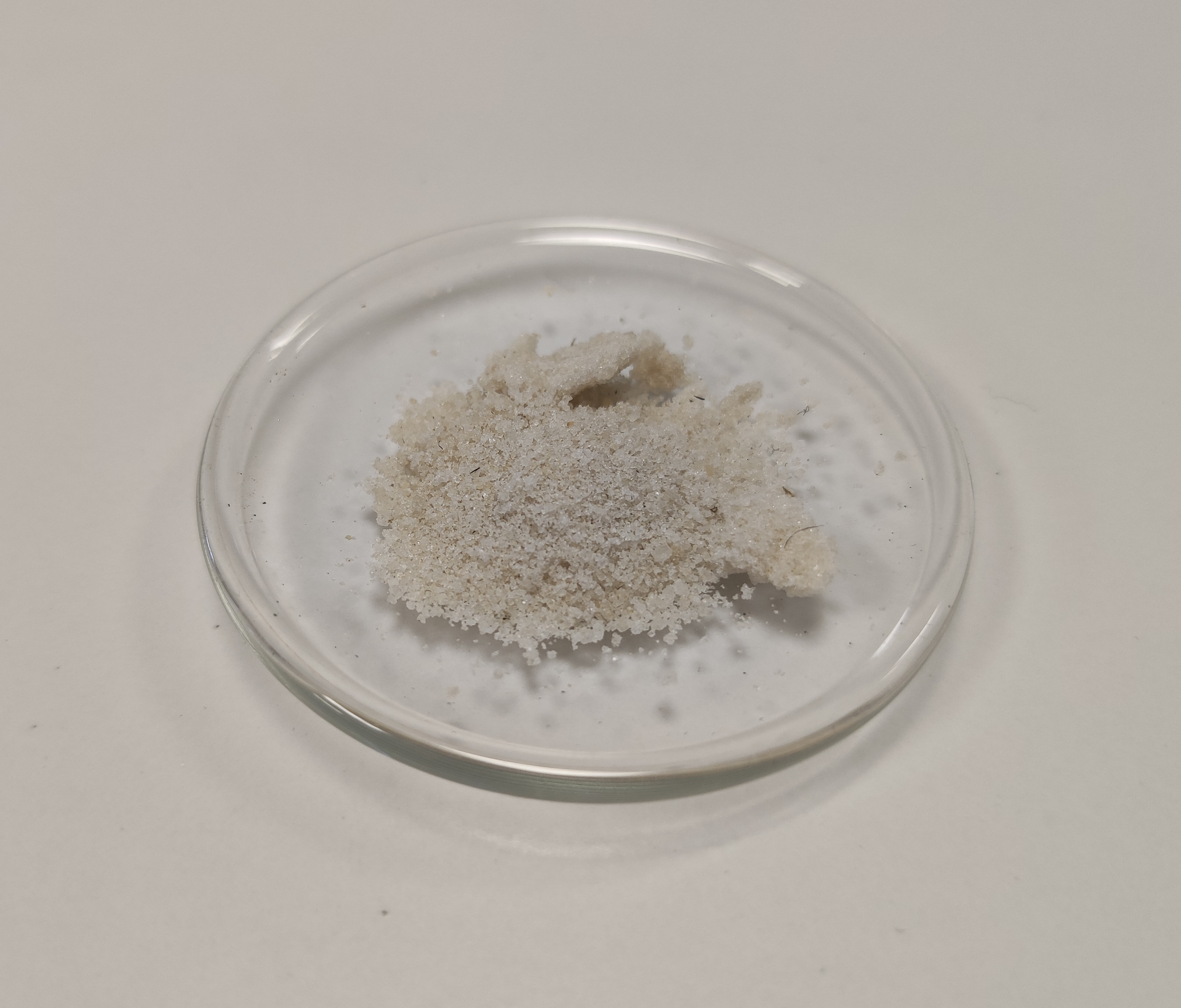

Names
- IUPAC name Rubidium iodide
- Other names: Rubidium monoiodide

Identifiers
CAS Number	7790-29-6
3D model (JSmol)	Interactive image
ChemSpider	74226
ECHA InfoCard	100.029.271
PubChem CID	3423208
RTECS number	VL8925000
UNII	18CYW0VL2X
CompTox Dashboard (EPA)	DTXSID00880081
- InChI: InChI=1S/HI.Rb/h1H;/q;+1/p-1 Key: WFUBYPSJBBQSOU-UHFFFAOYSA-M; InChI=1/HI.Rb/h1H;/q;+1/p-1 Key: WFUBYPSJBBQSOU-REWHXWOFAR
- SMILES: [Rb+].[I-]

Properties
Chemical formula	RbI
Molar mass	212.3723 g/mol
Appearance	white solid
Density	3.110 g/cm ^{3}
Melting point	646.85 °C (1,196.33 °F; 920.00 K)
Boiling point	1,304 °C (2,379 °F; 1,577 K)
Solubility in water	152 g/100 mL
Magnetic susceptibility (χ)	−72.2·10^{−6} cm^{3}/mol
Refractive index (n_{D})	1.6474

Hazards
- Lethal dose or concentration (LD, LC)
LD_{50} (median dose)	4708 mg/kg (oral, rat)
Safety data sheet (SDS)	External MSDS

Thermochemistry
Std molar entropy (S^{⦵}_{298})	118.11 J·K^{−1}·mol^{−1}
Std enthalpy of formation (Δ_{f}H^{⦵}_{298})	−328.7 kJ·mol^{−1}
Gibbs free energy (Δ_{f}G^{⦵})	−325.7 kJ·mol^{−1}

Related compounds
Other anions	Rubidium fluoride Rubidium chloride Rubidium bromide Rubidium astatide
Other cations	Lithium iodide Sodium iodide Potassium iodide Caesium iodide Francium iodide
Related compounds	Rubidium triiodide
- Except where otherwise noted, data are given for materials in their standard state (at 25 °C [77 °F], 100 kPa). verify (what is ?) Infobox references

Rubidium iodide, more specifically rubidium monoiodide, is a salt of rubidium and iodine, with the chemical formula RbI. It is a white solid with a melting point of 646.85 °C.

== Properties ==
Rubidium iodide forms colorless crystals, and has a red-violet flame color.

It is easily soluble in water, liquid ammonia, sulfuric acid, RbI·6NH_{3} and RbI·3SO_{2}. Rubidium iodide is soluble only in the following solvents:

Solubility of RbI in organic solvents (given in g RbI in 100 cm^{3} saturated solution)
Solvent	0 °C	25 °C
Acetonitrile	1.478	1.350
Propionitrile	0.274	0.305
Nitromethane	0.567	0.518
Acetone	0.960	0.674
Furfural		4,930

== Structure ==
Rubidium iodide has a sodium chloride structure; its lattice constant is a = 7.326 Å, and the Rb–I bond length is 3.66 Å.

== Preparation ==
Rubidium iodide can be synthesized in several ways. One is to use a mixed reaction of rubidium hydroxide and hydriodic acid/hydrogen iodide:

RbOH + HI → RbI + H_{2}O

Another method is to neutralize rubidium carbonate with hydriodic acid:

Rb_{2}CO_{3} + 2HI → 2RbI + H_{2}O + CO_{2}

Another method is to use rubidium metal to react directly with iodine, but because rubidium metal is very expensive, it is the least commonly used method. In addition, rubidium reacts violently with halogens and burns:

2Rb + I_{2} → 2RbI

== Applications ==
Rubidium iodide is used as a component of eye drops, in which it is sold in Romania under the name Rubjovit (containing 8 mg/ml RbI). Another product is Polijodurato. However, there are studies that show that rubidium iodide has allergy-triggering and inflammation-causing side effects. Homeopathic products containing rubidium iodide are available under the name Rubidium iodatum. In the past, towards the end of the 19th century, it was used to treat syphilis.

Rubidium iodide has isolated uses in organic synthesis, for example for the targeted saponification of a polymethylated phosphate.

== Reactions ==
Rubidium iodide reacts with halogens to form polyhalides: RbI_{3}, RbICl_{2}, RbICl_{4}.

== Bibliography ==
- CRC Handbook of Chemistry and Physics, 77th edition
