= Caesium triiodide =

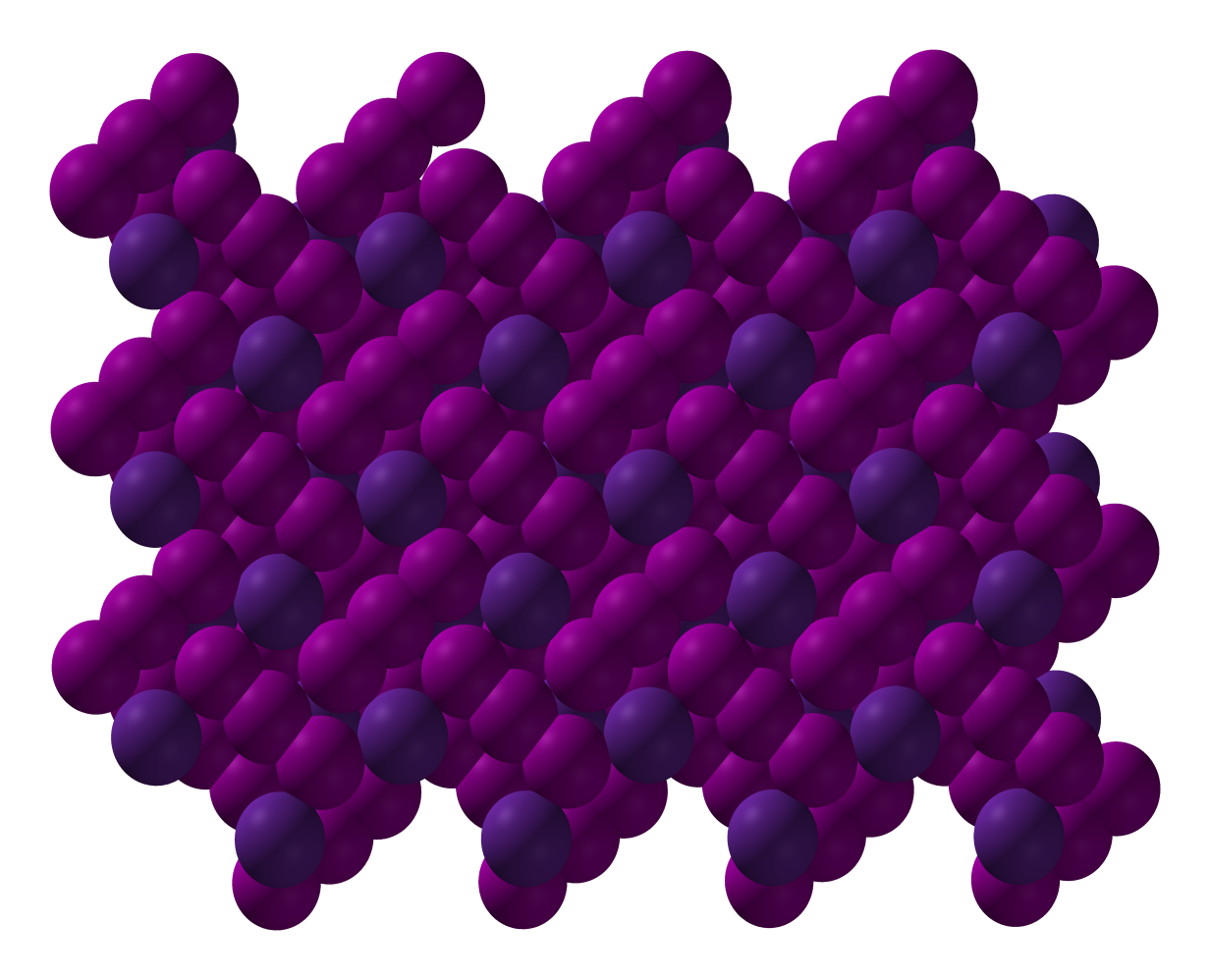

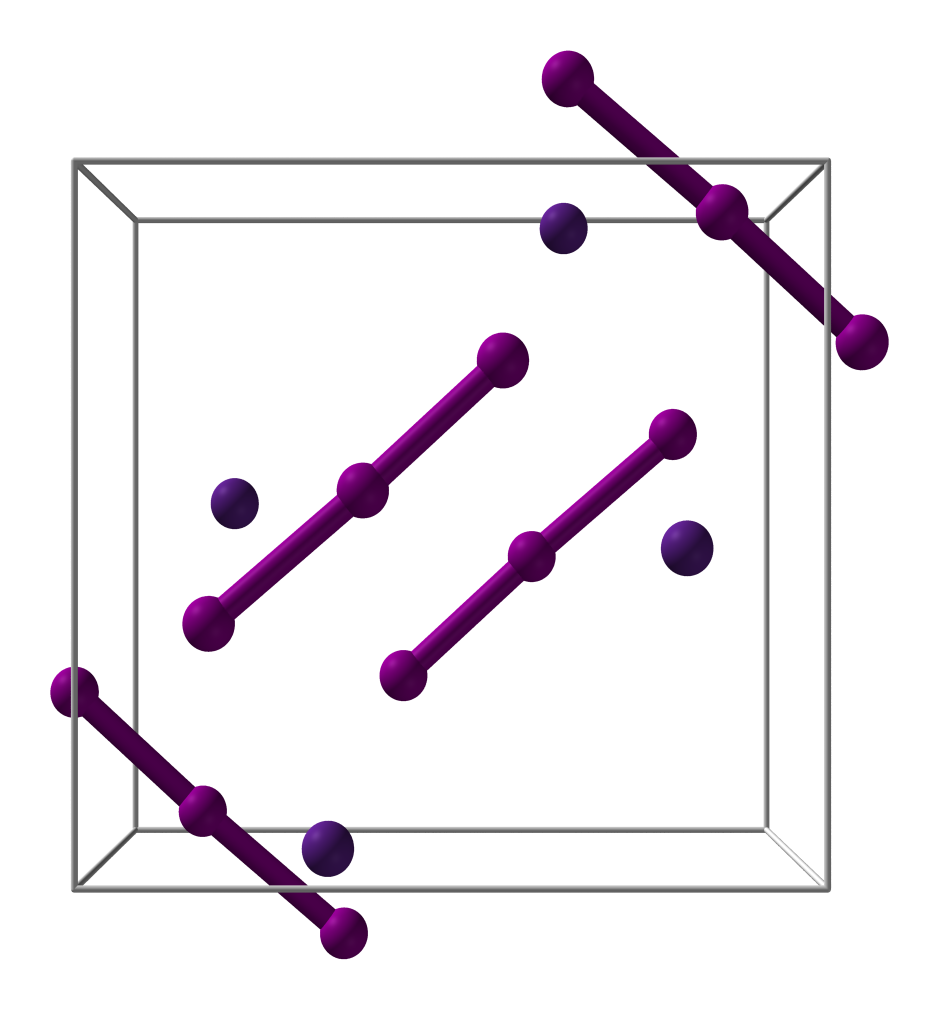

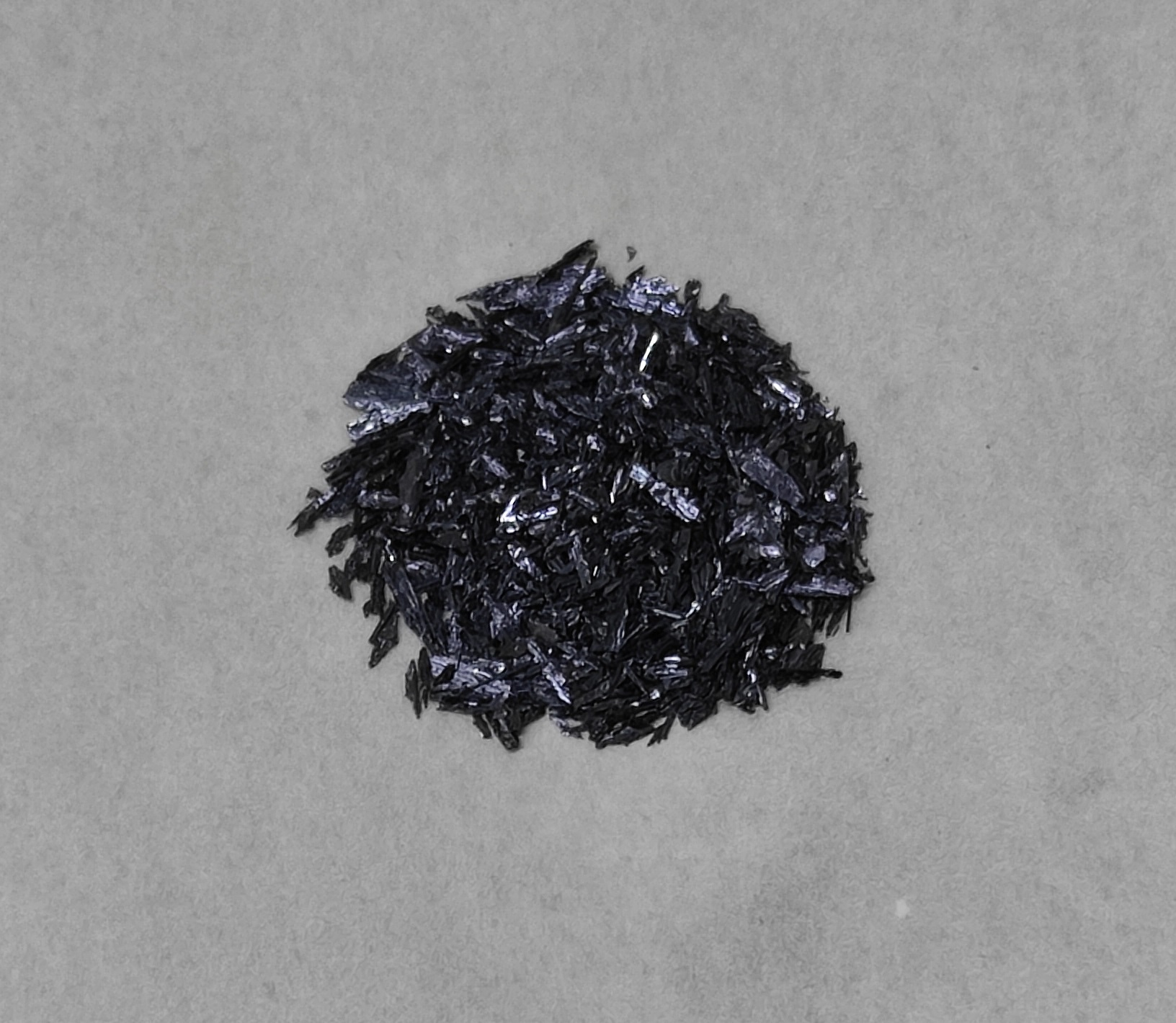

Identifiers
CAS Number	12297-72-2
3D model (JSmol)	Interactive image
ChemSpider	13753323
EC Number	625-701-4
PubChem CID	23717889
CompTox Dashboard (EPA)	DTXSID60747909
- InChI: InChI=1S/Cs.I3/c;1-3-2/q+1;-1 Key: PSDVEXXHXQVSQT-UHFFFAOYSA-N
- SMILES: I[I-]I.[Cs+]

Properties
Chemical formula	CsI_{3}
Molar mass	513.61886 g·mol^{−1}
Appearance	purple
Melting point	77 °C (decomposes)

Hazards
- GHS labelling
Pictograms	(GHS07: Exclamation mark) (GHS08: Health hazard)
Signal word	Danger
Hazard statements	H315, H317, H319, H334, H335
Precautionary statements	P233, P260, P264, P264+P265, P271, P272, P280, P284, P302+P352, P304+P340, P305+P351+P338, P319, P321, P333+P317, P337+P317, P342+P316, P362+P364, P403, P403+P233, P405, P501

Related compounds
Other cations	Rubidium triiodide
- Except where otherwise noted, data are given for materials in their standard state (at 25 °C [77 °F], 100 kPa). Infobox references

Caesium triiodide is an inorganic compound with chemical formula Cs^{+}[I_{3}]^{−}. It can be prepared by slow volatilization and crystallization of caesium iodide and iodine in aqueous ethanol solution.

It undergoes a phase transition from Pnma to P-3c1 under high pressure, and its structure changes from layered to 3D.
