= Caesium iodide =

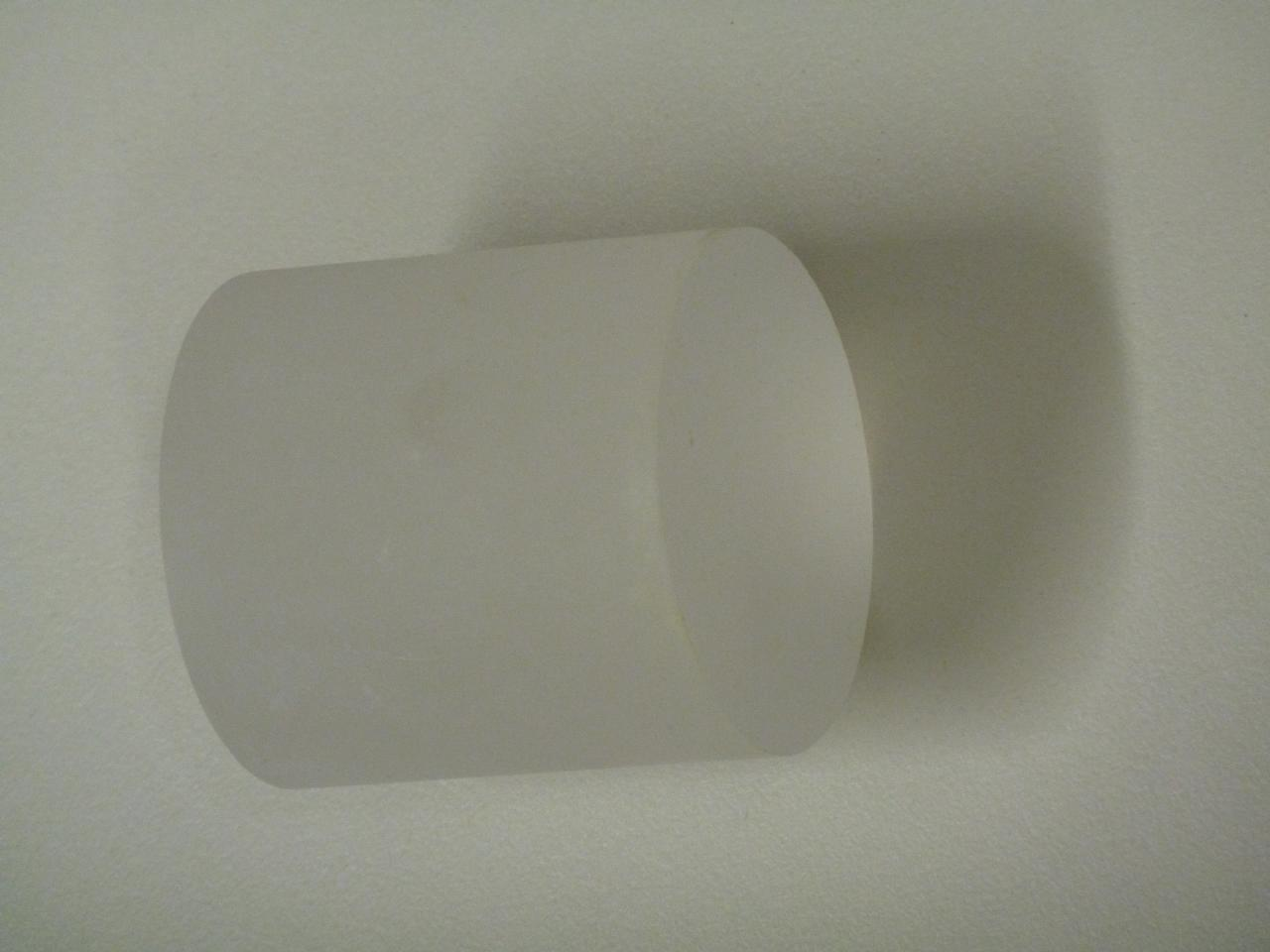
- Caesium iodide CsI crystal

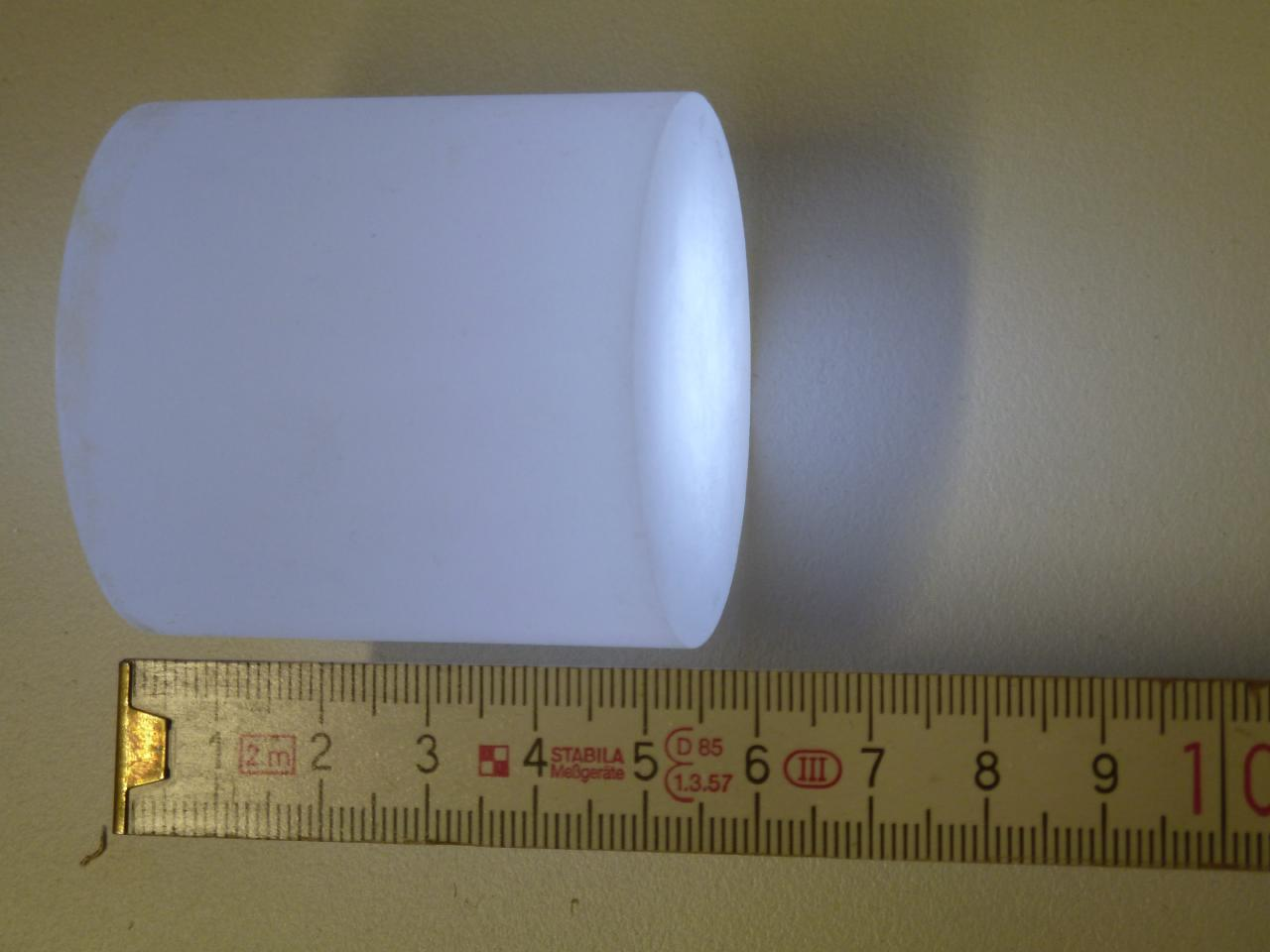
- Scintillating CsI crystal

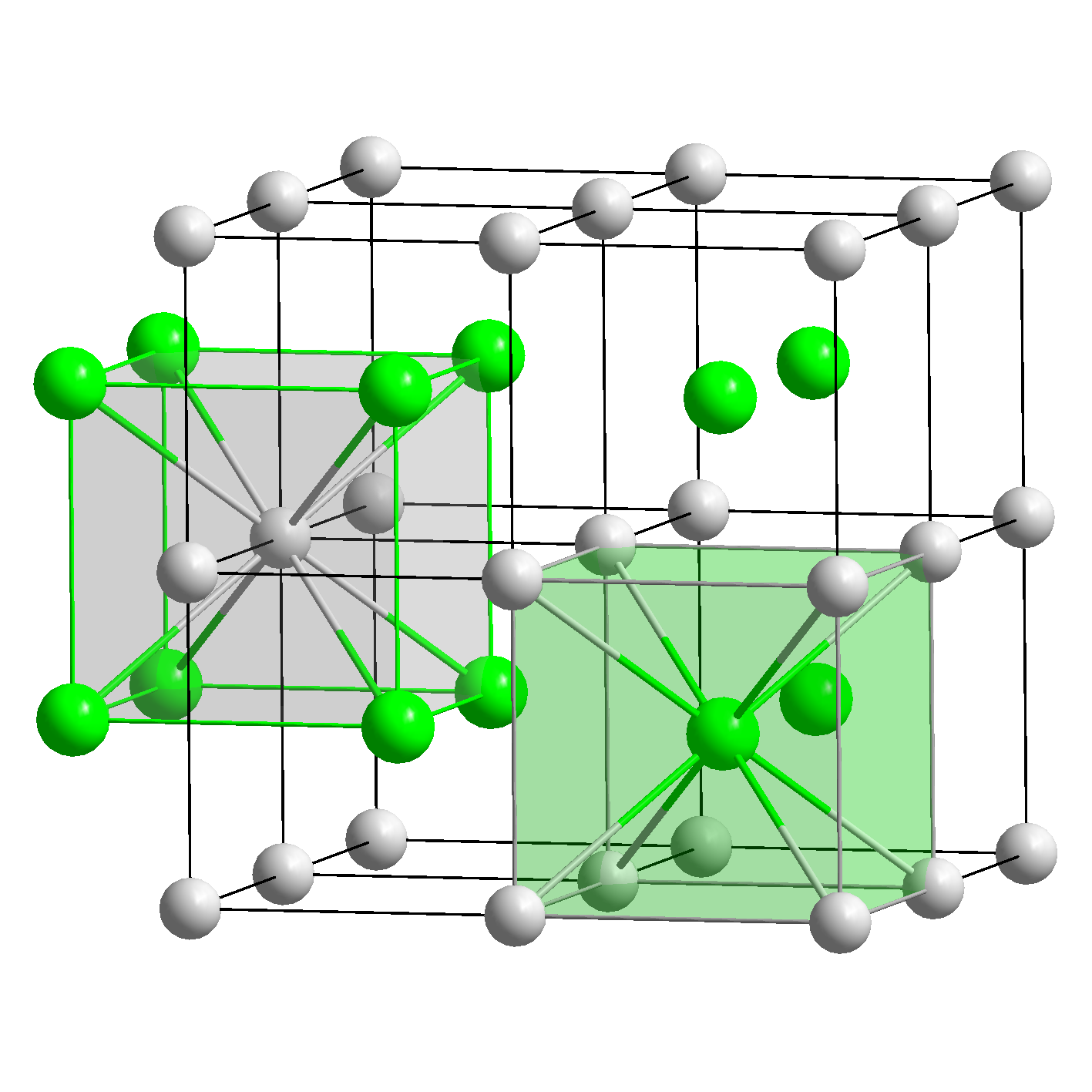
- Crystal structure

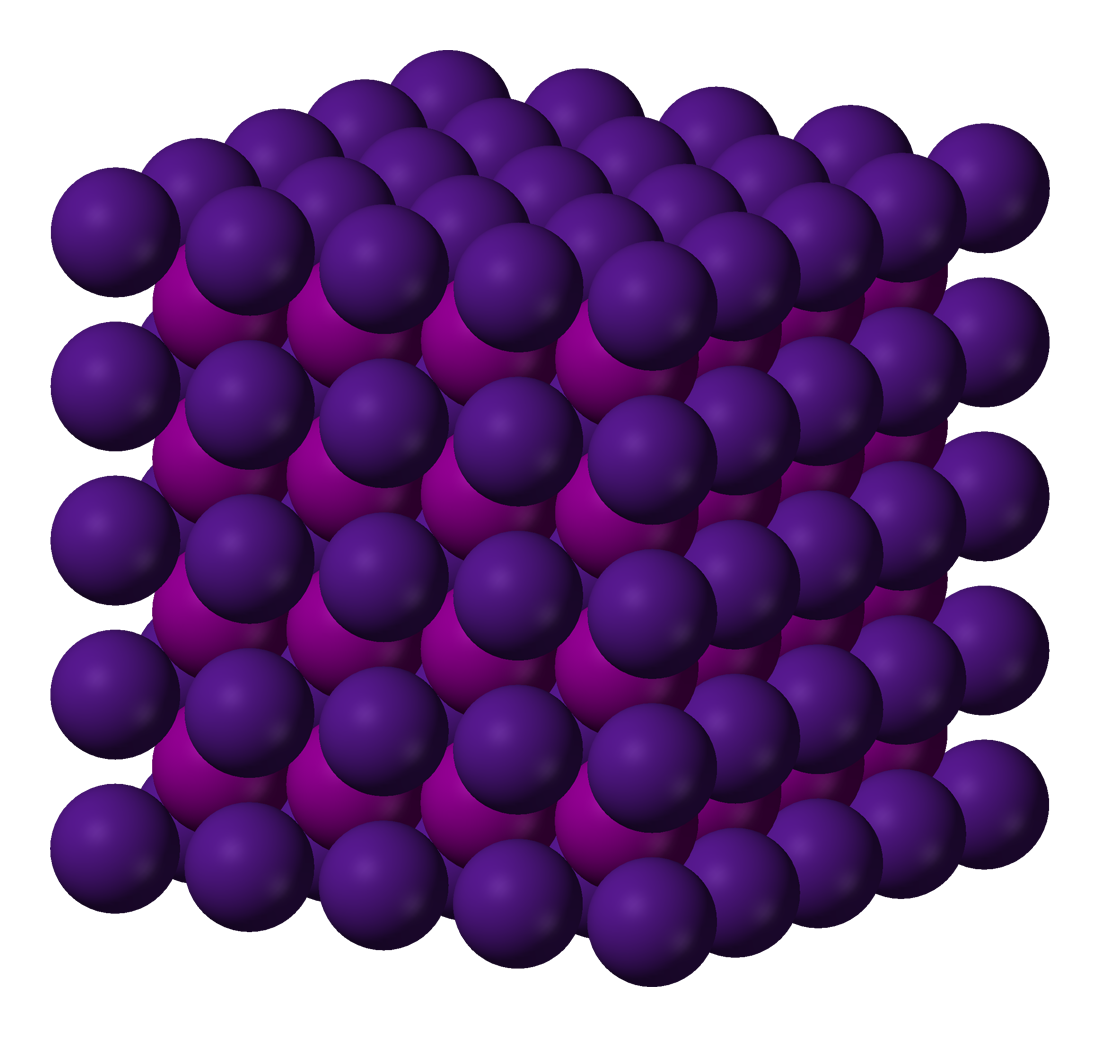

Names
- IUPAC name Caesium iodide
- Other names Cesium iodide

Identifiers
CAS Number	7789-17-5
3D model (JSmol)	Interactive image
ChemSpider	23003
ECHA InfoCard	100.029.223
EC Number	232-145-2
PubChem CID	24601
RTECS number	FL0350000
UNII	U1P3GVC56L
CompTox Dashboard (EPA)	DTXSID3064859
- InChI: InChI=1S/Cs.HI/h;1H/q+1;/p-1 Key: XQPRBTXUXXVTKB-UHFFFAOYSA-M; InChI=1/Cs.HI/h;1H/q+1;/p-1 Key: XQPRBTXUXXVTKB-REWHXWOFAA
- SMILES: [Cs+].[I-]

Properties
Chemical formula	CsI
Molar mass	259.809 g/mol
Appearance	white crystalline solid
Density	4.51 g/cm^{3}
Melting point	632 °C (1,170 °F; 905 K)
Boiling point	1,280 °C (2,340 °F; 1,550 K)
Solubility in water	848 g/L (25 °C)
Magnetic susceptibility (χ)	−82.6·10^{−6} cm^{3}/mol
Refractive index (n_{D})	1.9790 (0.3 µm); 1.7873 (0.59 µm); 1.7694 (0.75 µm); 1.7576 (1 µm); 1.7428 (5 µm); 1.7280 (20 µm)

Structure
Crystal structure	CsCl, cP2
Space group	Pm3̅m, No. 221
Lattice constant	a = 0.4503 nm
Lattice volume (V)	0.0913 nm^{3}
Formula units (Z)	1
Coordination geometry	Cubic (Cs^{+}); Cubic (I^{−})

Thermochemistry
Heat capacity (C)	52.8 J/mol·K
Std molar entropy (S^{⦵}_{298})	123.1 J/mol·K
Std enthalpy of formation (Δ_{f}H^{⦵}_{298})	−346.6 kJ/mol
Gibbs free energy (Δ_{f}G^{⦵})	−340.6 kJ/mol

Hazards
- GHS labelling
Pictograms	(GHS07: Exclamation mark) (GHS08: Health hazard) (GHS09: Environmental hazard)
Signal word	Warning
Hazard statements	H315, H317, H319, H335
Precautionary statements	P201, P202, P261, P264, P270, P271, P272, P273, P280, P281, P301+P312, P302+P352, P304+P340, P305+P351+P338, P308+P313, P312, P321, P330, P332+P313, P333+P313, P337+P313, P362, P363, P391, P403+P233, P405, P501
Flash point	Non-flammable
- Lethal dose or concentration (LD, LC)
LD_{50} (median dose)	2386 mg/kg (oral, rat)

Related compounds
Other anions	Caesium fluoride Caesium chloride Caesium bromide Caesium astatide
Other cations	Lithium iodide Sodium iodide Potassium iodide Rubidium iodide Francium iodide
- Except where otherwise noted, data are given for materials in their standard state (at 25 °C [77 °F], 100 kPa). verify (what is ?) Infobox references

Caesium iodide or cesium iodide (chemical formula CsI) is the ionic compound of caesium and iodine. It is often used as the input phosphor of an X-ray image intensifier tube found in fluoroscopy equipment. Caesium iodide photocathodes are highly efficient at extreme ultraviolet wavelengths.

== Synthesis and structure ==
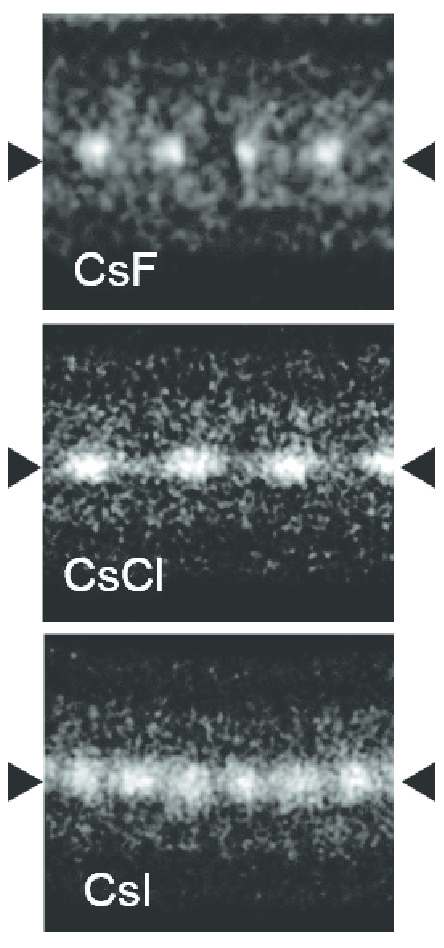
Monatomic caesium halide wires grown inside double-wall carbon nanotubes.

Bulk caesium iodide crystals have the cubic CsCl crystal structure, but the structure type of nanometer-thin CsI films depends on the substrate material – it is CsCl for mica and NaCl for LiF, NaBr and NaCl substrates.

Caesium iodide atomic chains can be grown inside double-wall carbon nanotubes. In such chains I atoms appear brighter than Cs atoms in electron micrographs despite having a smaller mass. This difference was explained by the charge difference between Cs atoms (positive), inner nanotube walls (negative) and I atoms (negative). As a result, Cs atoms are attracted to the walls and vibrate more strongly than I atoms, which are pushed toward the nanotube axis.

== Properties ==
Solubility of Csl in water
Т (°C)	0	10	20	25	30	40	50	60	70	80	90	100
S (wt%)	30.9	37.2	43.2	45.9	48.6	53.3	57.3	60.7	63.6	65.9	67.7	69.2

== Applications ==
An important application of caesium iodide crystals, which are scintillators, is electromagnetic calorimetry in experimental particle physics. Pure CsI is a fast and dense scintillating material with relatively low light yield that increases significantly with cooling, and a fairly small Molière radius is 3.5 cm. It exhibits two main emission components: one in the near ultraviolet region at the wavelength of 310 nm and one at 460 nm. The drawbacks of CsI are a high temperature gradient and a slight hygroscopicity.

Caesium iodide is used as a beamsplitter in Fourier transform infrared (FTIR) spectrometers. It has a wider transmission range than the more common potassium bromide beamsplitters, working range into the far infrared. However, optical-quality CsI crystals are very soft and hard to cleave or polish. They should also be coated (typically with germanium) and stored in a desiccator, to minimize interaction with atmospheric water vapors.

In addition to image intensifier input phosphors, caesium iodide is often also used in medicine as the scintillating material in flat panel x-ray detectors.

== Cited sources ==
- Haynes, William M., ed. (2011). CRC Handbook of Chemistry and Physics (92nd ed.). Boca Raton, Florida: CRC Press. ISBN 1-4398-5511-0.
