= Caesium bisulfate =

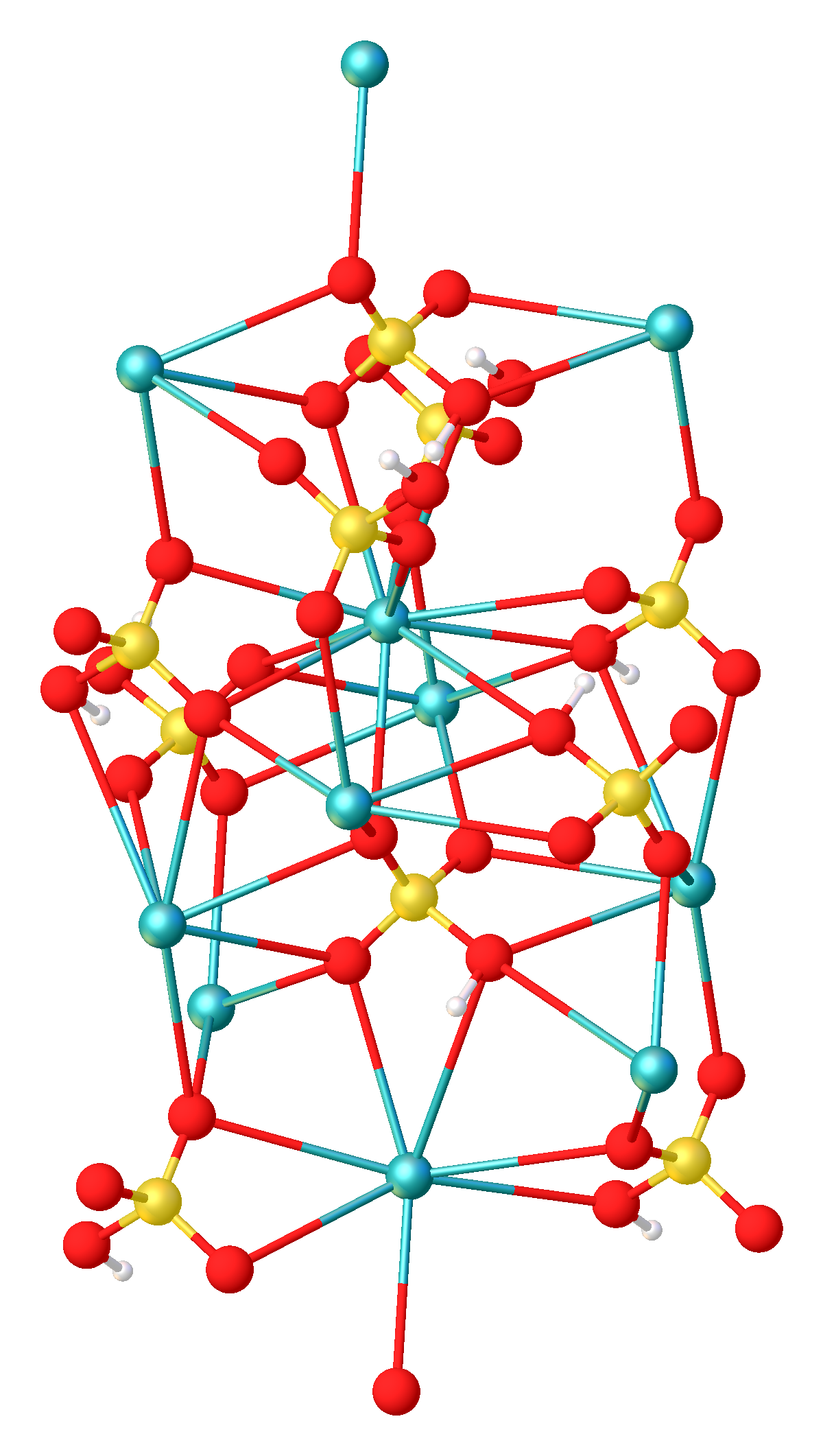

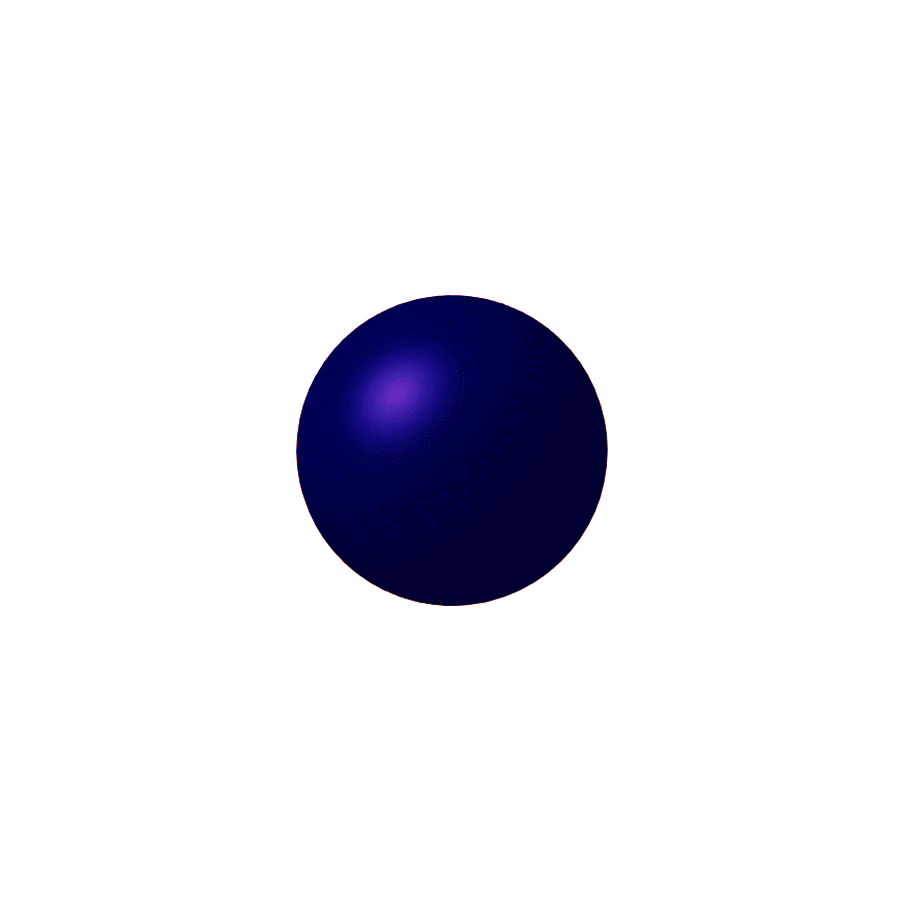

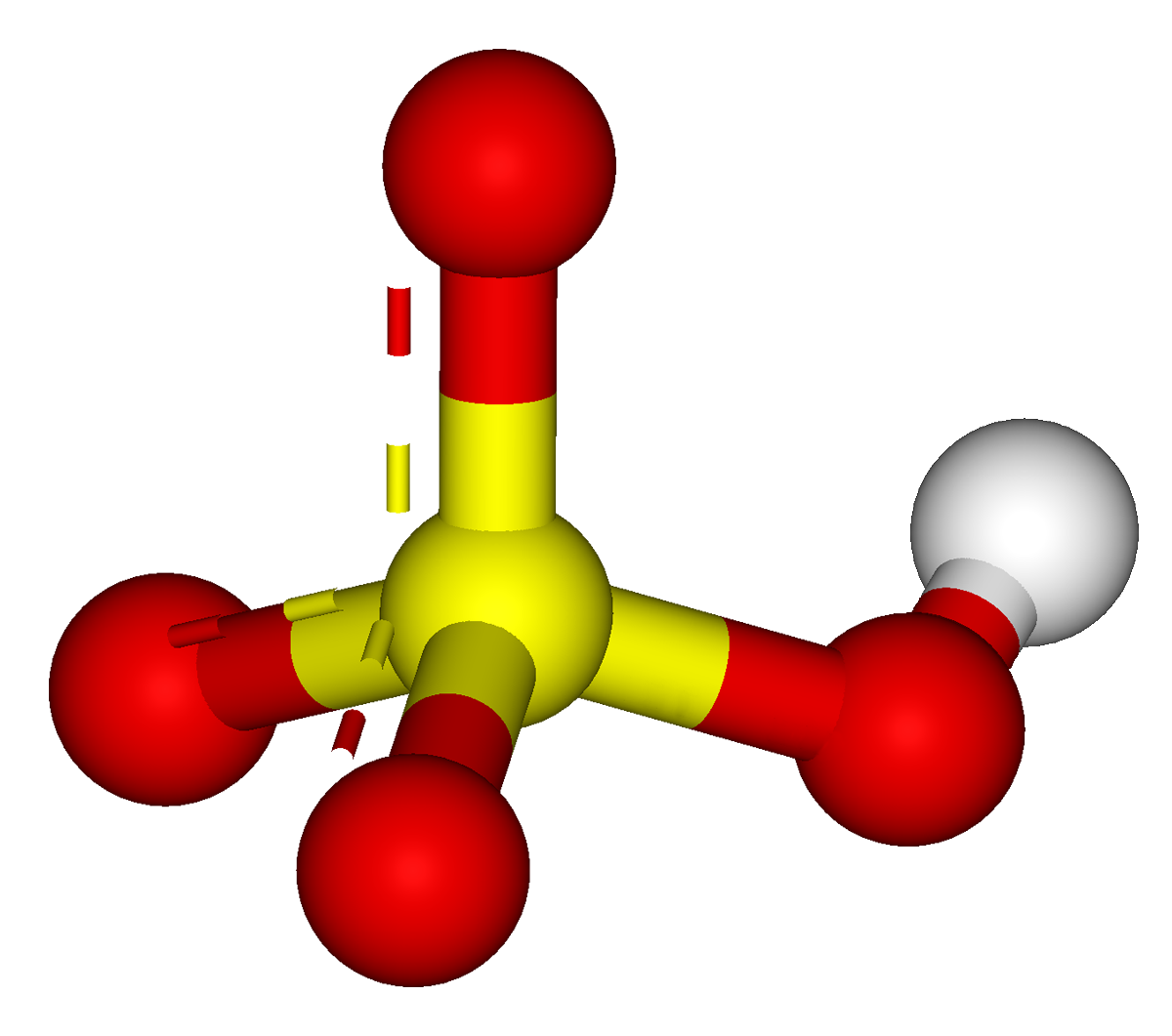

Names
- Other names: Cesium bisulfate; Cesium hydrogensulfate

Identifiers
CAS Number	7789-16-4
3D model (JSmol)	Interactive image
PubChem CID	23677635
CompTox Dashboard (EPA)	DTXSID301045981
- InChI: InChI=1S/Cs.H2O4S/c;1-5(2,3)4/h;(H2,1,2,3,4)/q+1;/p-1 Key: MEAHOQPOZNHISZ-UHFFFAOYSA-M
- SMILES: OS(=O)(=O)[O-].[Cs+]

Properties
Chemical formula	CsHO_{4}S
Molar mass	229.97 g·mol^{−1}
- Except where otherwise noted, data are given for materials in their standard state (at 25 °C [77 °F], 100 kPa). Infobox references

Caesium bisulfate or caesium hydrogensulfate is an inorganic compound with the formula CsHSO_{4}. The caesium salt of bisulfate, it is a colorless solid obtained by combining Cs_{2}SO_{4} and H_{2}SO_{4}.

== Properties ==
Above 141 °C, CsHSO_{4} is a superionic conductor. The rapid ionic conductivity arise especially in the range of these temperatures due to the high activity of protons.

Based on the results of X-ray crystallography, the structure consists of tetrahedral sulfate centers that bridge caesium ions. The proton is associated with the oxygen on sulfate.

CsHSO_{4} goes through three crystalline phases that are referred to as phase III, II, and I. CsHSO_{4} is initially existing in phase III at a room temperature of 21 °C. Phase III ranges from 21 °C to 90 °C with a transition temperature of 90 °C to 100 °C between phase III and phase II. Phase II ranges from 90 °C to 140 °C. At 140 °C, CsHSO_{4} undergoes a phase shift from phase II to phase I.

Phase III (21 °C to 90 °C) and Phase II (90 °C to 140 °C) are referred to as the monoclinic phases, in which CsHSO_{4} exhibits its lowest proton conductivity. As the crystalline structure's temperature is raised, it will show variations in the unit cell volume and the arrangement of its hydrogen bonds, which will alter the ability of a CsHSO_{4} crystalline structure to allow the displacement of protons.

At 141 °C, the CsHSO_{4} crystal structure experiences a structural change from monoclinic phase II to a tetragonal phase, becoming phase I. Phase I has more elevated crystal symmetry and widened lattice dimensions. Phase I is noted as the superprotonic phase (strong conducting phase), which triggers an extreme growth in proton conductivity by four orders of magnitude, reaching 10 mS/cm. This makes the conductivity of CsHSO_{4} ten-fold stronger than the conductivity of a sodium chloride aqueous solution. In the superprotonic phase, the movement of an SO_{4} tetrahedron generates a disruption of the hydrogen bond network, which accelerates proton transfer. The tetragonal anions available in the structure are accountable for the arrangement of the hydrogen bonds with the moving protons.

== Potential applications ==
The maximum conductivity of pure CsHSO_{4} is 10 mS/cm, which is too low for practical applications. In composites with SiO_{2}, TiO_{2}, and Al_{2}O_{3}), the proton conductivity below the phase transition temperature is enhanced by a few orders of magnitude.

Unlike hydrated protonic conductors, the absence of water in CsHSO_{4} provides thermal and electrochemical stability. Electromotive force (EMF) measurements in a humidified oxygen concentration cell verified the high ionic nature of CsHSO_{4} in its superprotonic phase. Based on heat rotation, the voltage stayed the same for over 85 hours during the measurement, particularly at the high temperature. These results, demonstrate the thermal independence from humidity-type environments. Additionally, the crystal structure of CsHSO_{4} allows for quick transport of smaller charged ions, resulting in efficient energy transfer in electrochemical devices.
