= Caesium sulfate =

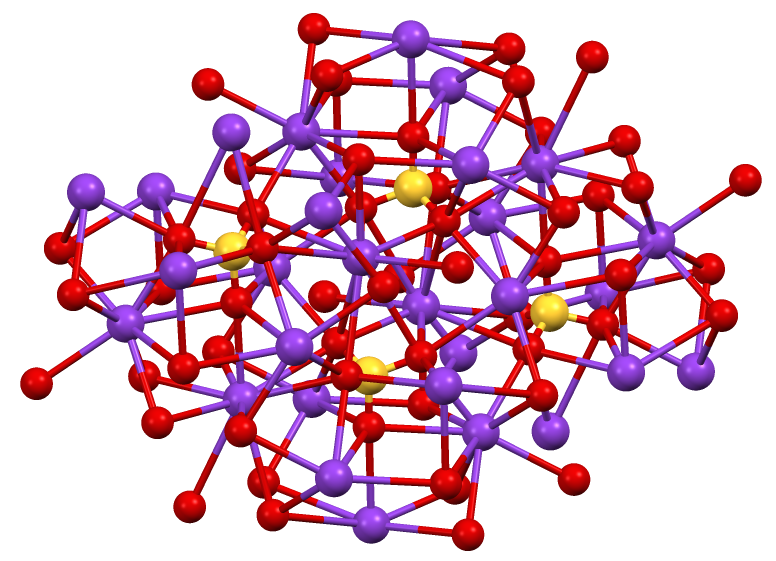

Names
- Other names Cesium sulfate

Identifiers
CAS Number	10294-54-9
3D model (JSmol)	Interactive image
ChemSpider	23482
ECHA InfoCard	100.030.589
EC Number	233-662-6
PubChem CID	25137
UNII	8D6R91CS62
CompTox Dashboard (EPA)	DTXSID10883109
- InChI: InChI=1S/2Cs.H2O4S/c;;1-5(2,3)4/h;;(H2,1,2,3,4)/q2*+1;/p-2 Key: FLJPGEWQYJVDPF-UHFFFAOYSA-L; InChI=1/2Cs.H2O4S/c;;1-5(2,3)4/h;;(H2,1,2,3,4)/q2*+1;/p-2 Key: FLJPGEWQYJVDPF-NUQVWONBAO
- SMILES: [Cs+].[Cs+].[O-]S([O-])(=O)=O

Properties
Chemical formula	Cs_{2}SO_{4}
Molar mass	361.87 g/mol
Density	4.243 g/cm^{3}, solid
Melting point	1,010 °C (1,850 °F; 1,280 K)
Solubility in water	167 g/100 ml (0 °C); 179 g/100 ml (20 °C)
Solubility	insoluble in ethanol, acetone
Magnetic susceptibility (χ)	−116.0·10^{−6} cm^{3}/mol

Hazards
- GHS labelling
Pictograms	(GHS07: Exclamation mark) (GHS08: Health hazard)
Signal word	Warning
Hazard statements	H302, H361, H412
Precautionary statements	P201, P202, P264, P270, P273, P281, P301+P312, P308+P313, P330, P405, P501
Flash point	Non-flammable
- Lethal dose or concentration (LD, LC)
LD_{50} (median dose)	2830 mg/kg (oral, rat)

Related compounds
Other anions	Caesium hydrogen sulfate
Other cations	Lithium sulfate Sodium sulfate Potassium sulfate Rubidium sulfate
- Except where otherwise noted, data are given for materials in their standard state (at 25 °C [77 °F], 100 kPa). verify (what is ?) Infobox references

Caesium sulfate, cesium sulfate, caesium sulphate or cesium sulphate is the inorganic compound and salt with the formula Cs_{2}SO_{4}. It is a white water-soluble solid that is used to prepare dense aqueous solutions for use in isopycnic centrifugation. It is isostructural with potassium sulfate.

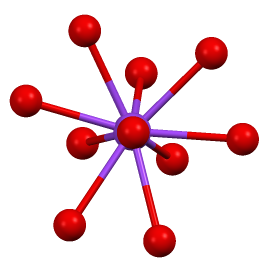
Coordination sphere of one of two types of Cs^{+} site in Cs_{2}SO_{4}.

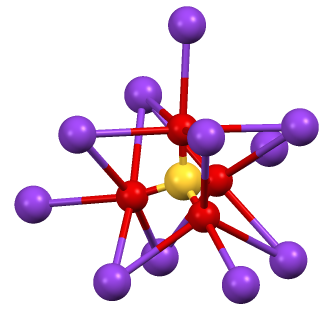
Environment of sulfate anion in β-Cs_{2}SO_{4}.
