= Ammonium triiodide =

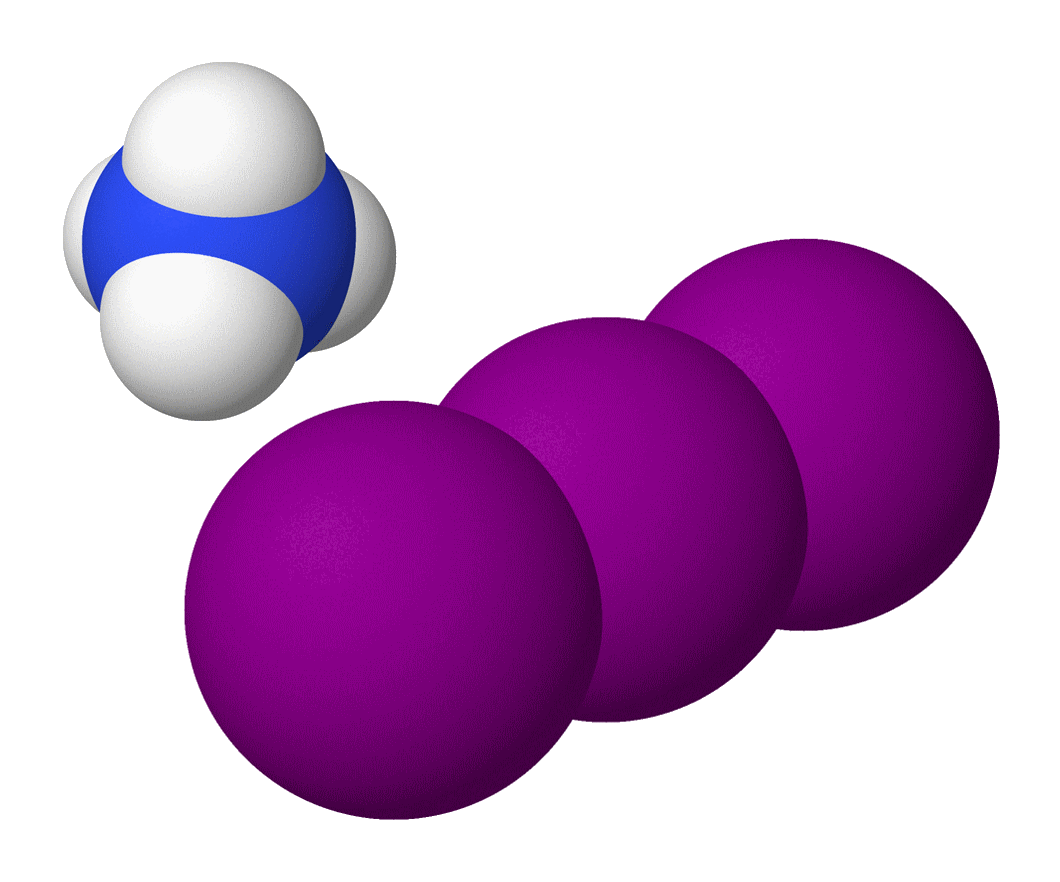

Names
- IUPAC name Ammonium triiodide

Identifiers
CAS Number	12298-32-7
3D model (JSmol)	Interactive image
ChemSpider	13206303
PubChem CID	22991060
CompTox Dashboard (EPA)	DTXSID80629399
- InChI: InChI=1S/I3.H3N/c1-3-2;/h;1H3/q-1;/p+1 Key: ZAAKNRTWGPSIKF-UHFFFAOYSA-O; InChI=1/I3.H3N/c1-3-2;/h;1H3/q-1;/p+1 Key: ZAAKNRTWGPSIKF-IKLDFBCSAD
- SMILES: [NH4+].I[I-]I

Properties
Chemical formula	H_{4}I_{3}N
Molar mass	398.752 g·mol^{−1}
- Except where otherwise noted, data are given for materials in their standard state (at 25 °C [77 °F], 100 kPa). verify (what is ?) Infobox references

Ammonium triiodide (NH_{4}I_{3}) is the salt of the ammonium cation with the triiodide anion.

Sometimes the name ammonium triiodide is mistakenly used to refer to a different compound, nitrogen triiodide (NI_{3}), or more precisely, the slightly more stable ammine, NI_{3} · NH_{3}.
