= Rubidium triiodide =

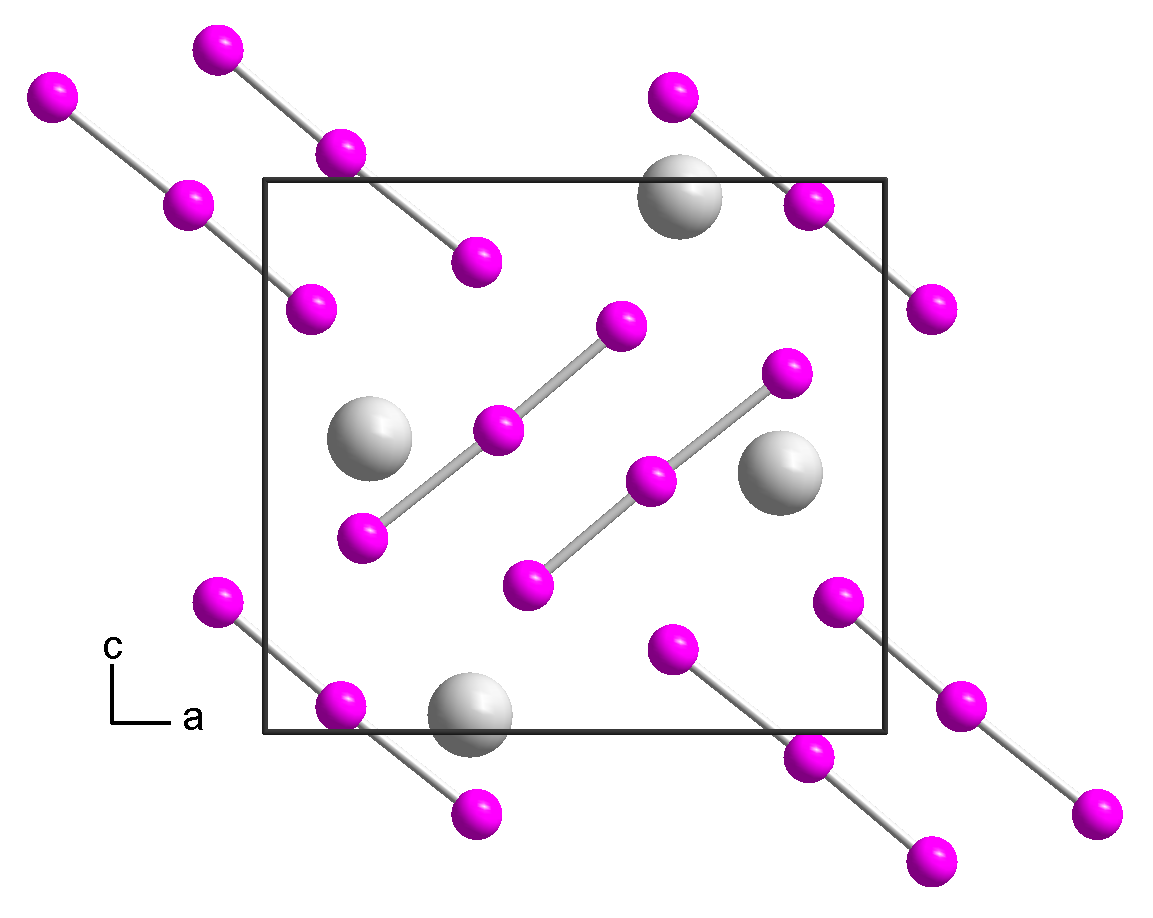

Identifiers
CAS Number	12298-69-0
3D model (JSmol)	Interactive image
PubChem CID	23717888
- InChI: InChI=1S/I3.Rb/c1-3-2;/q-1;+1 Key: PXHPKMRCAYWMAT-UHFFFAOYSA-N
- SMILES: [Rb+].I[I-]I

Properties
Chemical formula	RbI_{3}
Appearance	black crystals

Related compounds
Other cations	Caesium triiodide
- Except where otherwise noted, data are given for materials in their standard state (at 25 °C [77 °F], 100 kPa). Infobox references

Rubidium triiodide is an inorganic compound with the chemical formula RbI_{3}. It is composed of Rb^{+} and I_{3}^{−}.

== Preparation ==
Rubidium triiodide can be obtained by heating rubidium iodide and iodine in aqueous solution:

RbI + I_{2} → RbI_{3}

== Properties ==
Rubidium triiodide is an orthorhombic black crystal, isomorphic to caesium triiodide, with space group Pnma, unit cell parameters a = 1090.8 pm, b = 665.5 pm, c = 971.1 pm. Upon heating to 270 °C, the rubidium triiodide decomposes into rubidium iodide and elemental iodine. It is soluble in ethanol and decomposes in ether.

== Reactions ==
It has long been believed that rubidium triiodide reacts further with iodine to form RbI_{7} and RbI_{9}, but this has been refuted by recent studies.
