= Alkali metal halide =

Family of compounds consisting of an alkali metal bonded to a halogen

Alkali metal halides, or alkali halides, are the family of inorganic compounds with the chemical formula MX, where M is an alkali metal and X is a halogen. These compounds are the often commercially significant sources of these metals and halides. The best known of these compounds is sodium chloride, table salt.

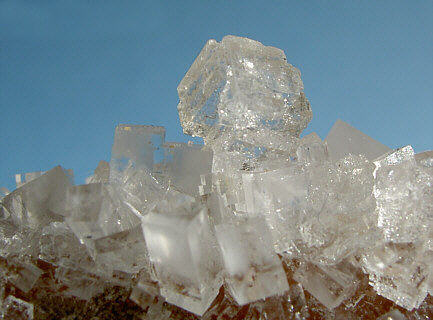
Halite is the mineral form of sodium chloride.

== Structure ==
Most alkali metal halides crystallize with the face-centered cubic lattices. In this structure both the metals and halides feature octahedral coordination geometry, in which each ion has a coordination number of six. Caesium chloride, bromide, and iodide crystallize in a body-centered cubic lattice that accommodates coordination number of eight for the larger metal cation (and the anion also).

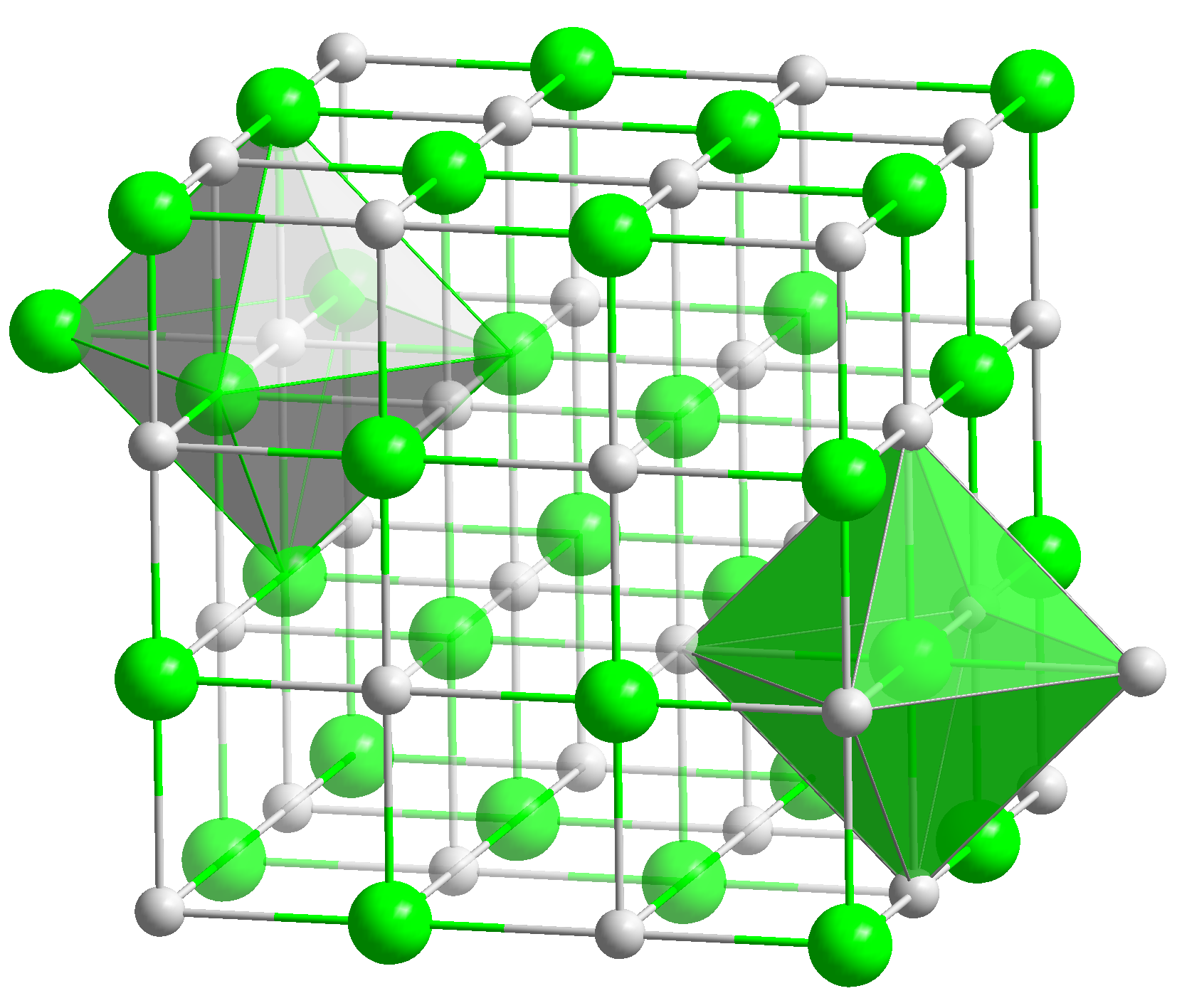
Ball-and-stick model of the coordination of Na and Cl in NaCl. Most alkali metal halides adopt this structure.

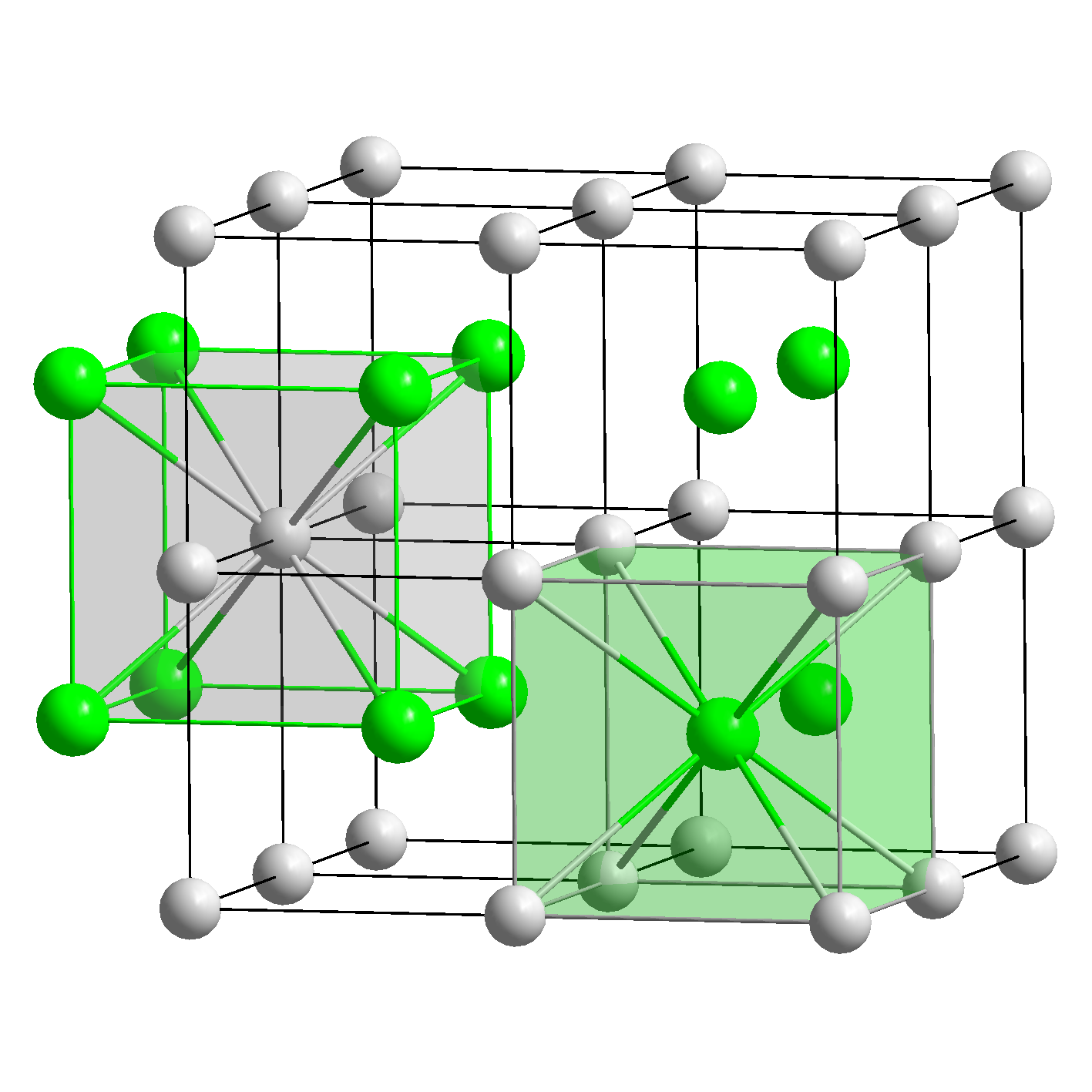
Ball-and-stick model of the coordination of Cs and Cl in CsCl

== Properties ==
The alkali metal halides exist as colourless crystalline solids, although as finely ground powders appear white. They melt at high temperature, usually several hundred degrees to colorless liquids. Their high melting point reflects their high lattice energies. At still higher temperatures, these liquids evaporate to give gases composed of diatomic molecules.

These compounds dissolve in polar solvents to give ionic solutions that contain highly solvated anions and cations. Alkali halides dissolve large amounts of the corresponding alkali metal: caesium is completely miscible at all temperatures above the melting point.

The table below provides links to each of the individual articles for these compounds. The numbers beside the compounds show the electronegativity difference between the elements based on the Pauling scale. The higher the number is, the more ionic the solid is.

		Alkali metals				
		Lithium	Sodium	Potassium	Rubidium	Caesium
Halogens	Fluorine	LiF (3.0)	NaF (3.1)	KF (3.2)	RbF (3.2)	CsF (3.3)
Halogens	Chlorine	LiCl (2.0)	NaCl (2.1)	KCl (2.2)	RbCl (2.2)	CsCl (2.3)
Halogens	Bromine	LiBr (1.8)	NaBr (1.9)	KBr (2.0)	RbBr (2.0)	CsBr (2.1)
Halogens	Iodine	LiI (1.5)	NaI (1.6)	KI (1.7)	RbI (1.7)	CsI (1.8)
