= Rubidium bromide =

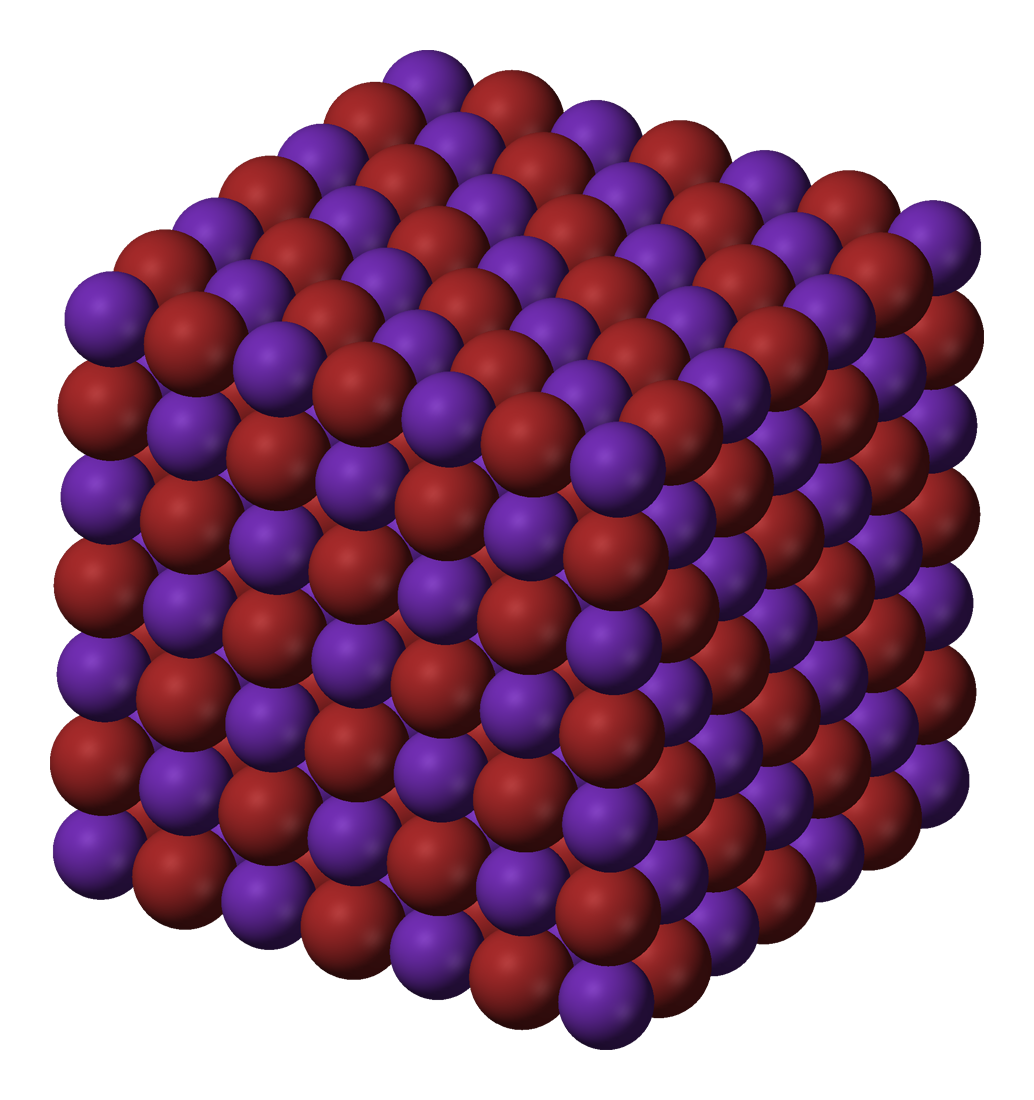
- Rubidium bromide

Names
- IUPAC name Rubidium bromide
- Other names Rubidium(I) bromide

Identifiers
CAS Number	7789-39-1
3D model (JSmol)	Interactive image
ChemSpider	74217
ECHA InfoCard	100.029.238
PubChem CID	4670918
UNII	33CM31XVQQ
CompTox Dashboard (EPA)	DTXSID00894885
- InChI: InChI=1S/BrH.Rb/h1H;/q;+1/p-1 Key: JAAGVIUFBAHDMA-UHFFFAOYSA-M; InChI=1/BrH.Rb/h1H;/q;+1/p-1 Key: JAAGVIUFBAHDMA-REWHXWOFAB
- SMILES: [Rb+].[Br-]

Properties
Chemical formula	RbBr
Molar mass	165.372 g/mol
Appearance	white crystalline solid
Density	3.35 g/cm^{3}
Melting point	682 °C (1,260 °F; 955 K)
Boiling point	1,340 °C (2,440 °F; 1,610 K)
Solubility in water	47.26 g/100 mL (0.5°C); 53.69 g/100 mL (25°C); 67.24 g/100 mL (113.5°C)
Magnetic susceptibility (χ)	−56.4·10^{−6} cm^{3}/mol

Hazards
Flash point	Non-flammable

Thermochemistry
Enthalpy of fusion (Δ_{f}H^{⦵}_{fus})	15.50 kJ/mol

Related compounds
Other anions	Rubidium fluoride Rubidium chloride Rubidium iodide Rubidium astatide
Other cations	Lithium bromide Sodium bromide Potassium bromide Caesium bromide Francium bromide
- Except where otherwise noted, data are given for materials in their standard state (at 25 °C [77 °F], 100 kPa). verify (what is ?) Infobox references

Rubidium bromide is an inorganic compound with the chemical formula RbBr. It is a salt of hydrogen bromide. It consists of bromide anions Br^{−} and rubidium cations Rb^{+}. It has a NaCl crystal structure, with a lattice constant of 685 picometres.

== Preparation ==
There are several methods for synthesising rubidium bromide. One involves reacting rubidium hydroxide with hydrobromic acid:

RbOH + HBr → RbBr + H_{2}O

Another method is to neutralize rubidium carbonate with hydrobromic acid:

Rb_{2}CO_{3} + 2 HBr → 2 RbBr + H_{2}O + CO_{2}
