= Lutetium phthalocyanine =

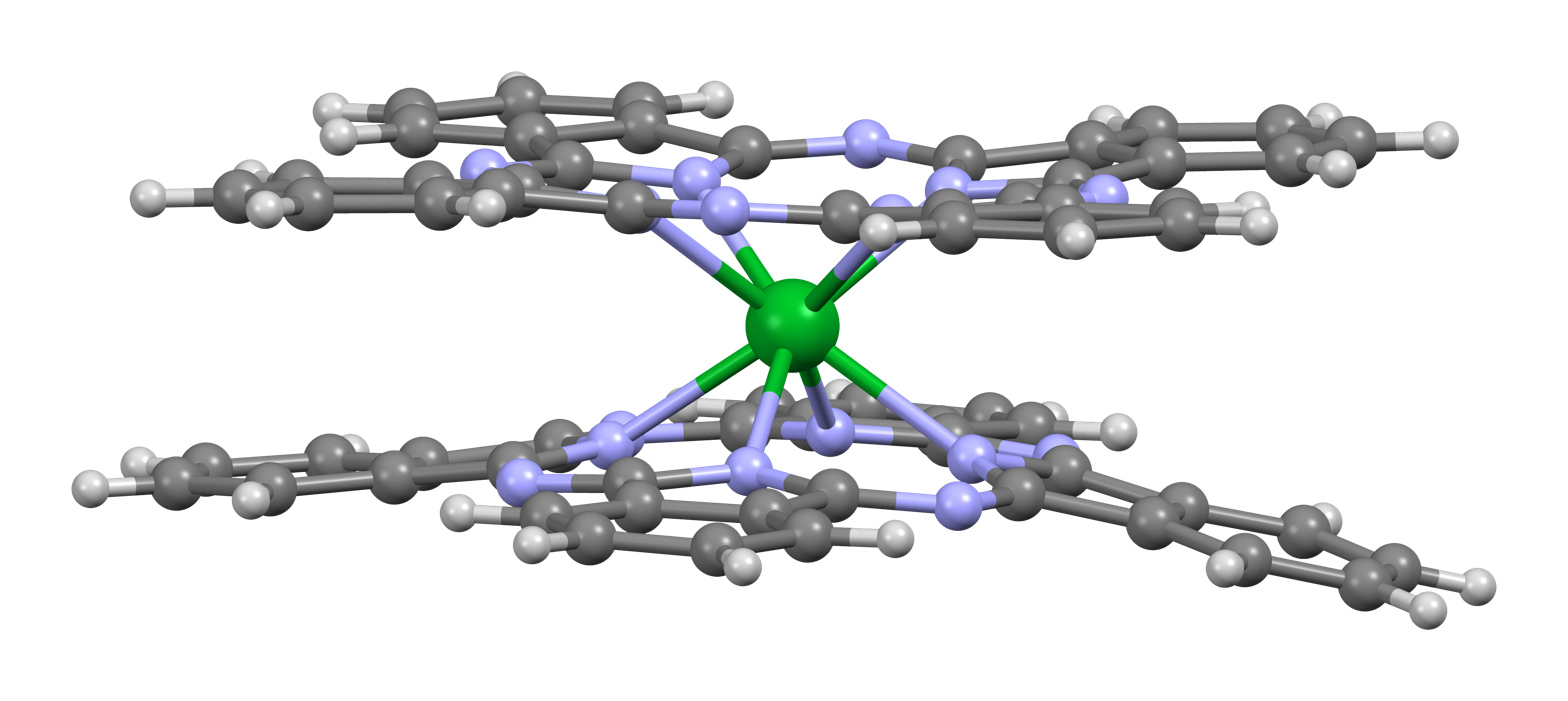

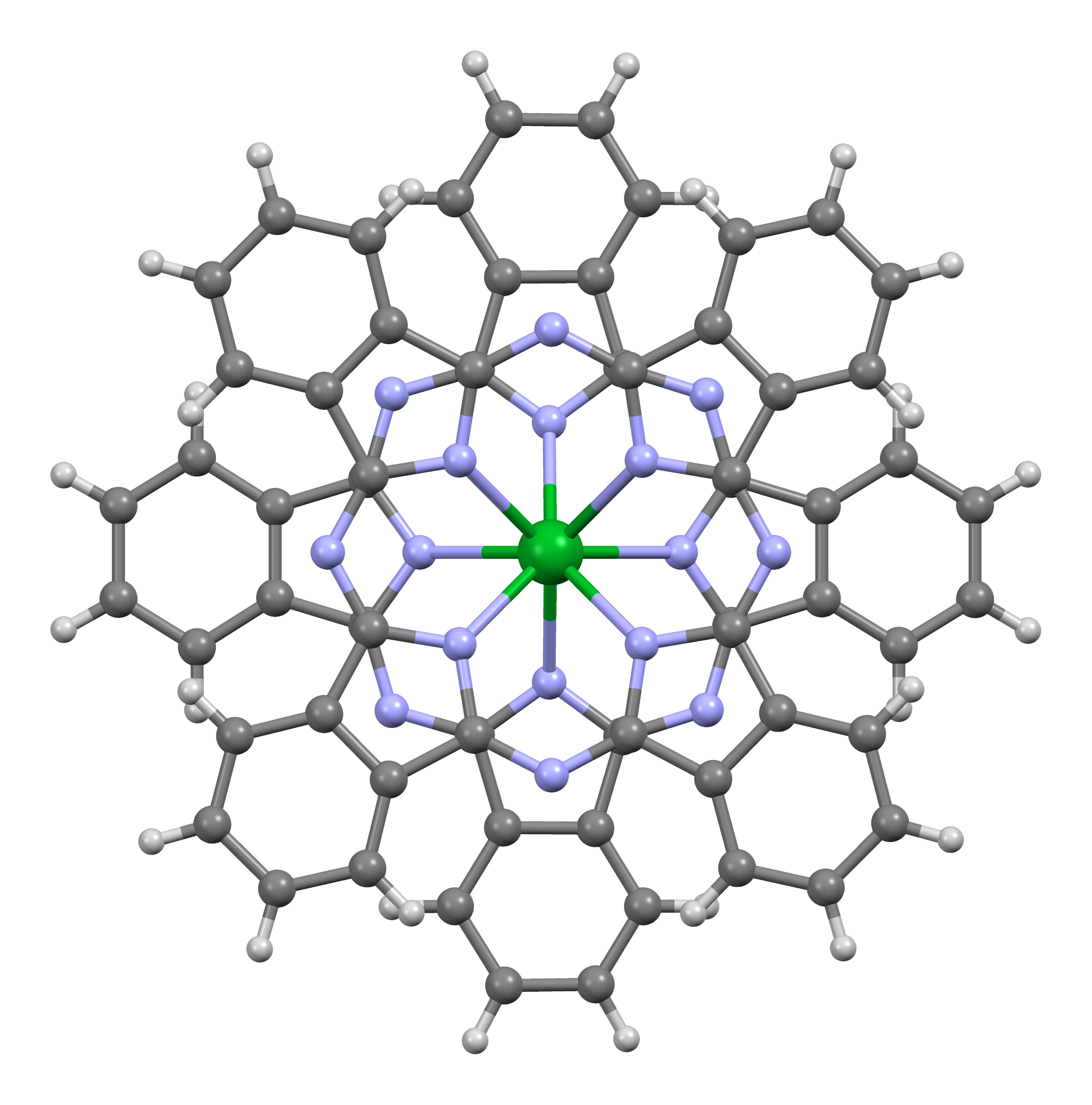

Names
- Other names Lutetium bisphthalocyanine Lutetium biphthalocyanine

Identifiers
3D model (JSmol)	Interactive image
- InChI: InChI=1S/2C32H16N8.Lu/c2*1-2-10-18-17(9-1)25-33-26(18)38-28-21-13-5-6-14-22(21)30(35-28)40-32-24-16-8-7-15-23(24)31(36-32)39-29-20-12-4-3-11-19(20)27(34-29)37-25;/h2*1-16H;/q2*-2;+3 StdInChIKey=YBUYPYVECVICRC-UHFFFAOYSA-N
- SMILES: C15=CC=CC=C1C6=NC9=C2C=CC=CC2=C(N=C4C3=CC=CC=C3C(=N4)N=C7C8=C(C(=NC5=N6)[N-]7)C=CC=C8)[N-]9.C%10%14=CC=CC=C%10C%15=NC%18=C%11C=CC=CC%11=C(N=C%13C%12=CC=CC=C%12C(=N%13)N=C%16C%17=C(C(=NC%14=N%15)[N-]%16)C=CC=C%17)[N-]%18.[Lu+3]

Properties
Chemical formula	LuC_{64}H_{32}N_{16}
Molar mass	1200.04 g/mol
Appearance	green solid; red when oxidized; blue when reduced
- Except where otherwise noted, data are given for materials in their standard state (at 25 °C [77 °F], 100 kPa). Infobox references

Lutetium phthalocyanine (LuPc_{2}) is a coordination compound derived from lutetium and two phthalocyanines. It was the first known example of a molecule that is an intrinsic semiconductor. It exhibits electrochromism, changing color when subject to a voltage.

== Structure ==
LuPc_{2} is a sandwich compound consisting of a Lu^{3+} ion coordinated to the conjugate base of two phthalocyanines. The rings are arranged in a staggered conformation. The extremities of the two ligands are slightly distorted outwards. The complex features a non-innocent ligand, in the sense that the macrocycles carry an extra electron. It is a free radical with the unpaired electron sitting in a half-filled molecular orbital between the highest occupied and lowest unoccupied orbitals, allowing its electronic properties to be finely tuned.

== Properties ==
LuPc_{2}, along with many substituted derivatives like the alkoxy-methyl derivative Lu[(C_{8}H_{17}OCH_{2})_{8}Pc]_{2}, can be deposited as a thin film with intrinsic semiconductor properties; said properties arise due to its radical nature and its low reduction potential compared to other metal phthalocyanines. This initially green film exhibits electrochromism; the oxidized form LuPc^{+}_{2} is red, whereas the reduced form LuPc^{−}_{2} is blue and the next two reduced forms are dark blue and violet, respectively. The green/red oxidation cycle can be repeated over 10,000 times in aqueous solution with dissolved alkali metal halides, before it is degraded by hydroxide ions; the green/blue redox degrades faster in water.

== Electrical properties ==
LuPc_{2} and other lanthanide phthalocyanines are of interest in the development of organic thin-film field-effect transistors.

LuPc_{2} derivatives can be selected to change color in the presence of certain molecules, such as in gas detectors; for example, the thioether derivative Lu[(C_{6}H_{13}S)_{8}Pc]_{2} changes from green to brownish-purple in the presence of NADH.
