= Bromism =

Medical condition resulting from overconsumption of bromine (Br)

- Specialty: Emergency medicine, psychiatry, neurology

Bromism is the syndrome which results from the long-term consumption of bromine, usually through bromine-based sedatives such as potassium bromide and lithium bromide. In late 19th century and early 20th century, bromides like potassium bromide were the only effective medicine for epilepsy. It was also used for insomnia, anxiety, and excessive libido, making it one of the most frequently used class of medicinal drugs prior to its decline in popularity as better drugs with fewer side effects were developed.

Bromism was once a very common disorder, being responsible for 5 to 10% of psychiatric hospital admissions, but is now uncommon since bromide was withdrawn from clinical use in many countries and was severely restricted in others. Infrequent cases have been more recently described involving internet-purchased supplements and sleep-aids.

== Presentation ==
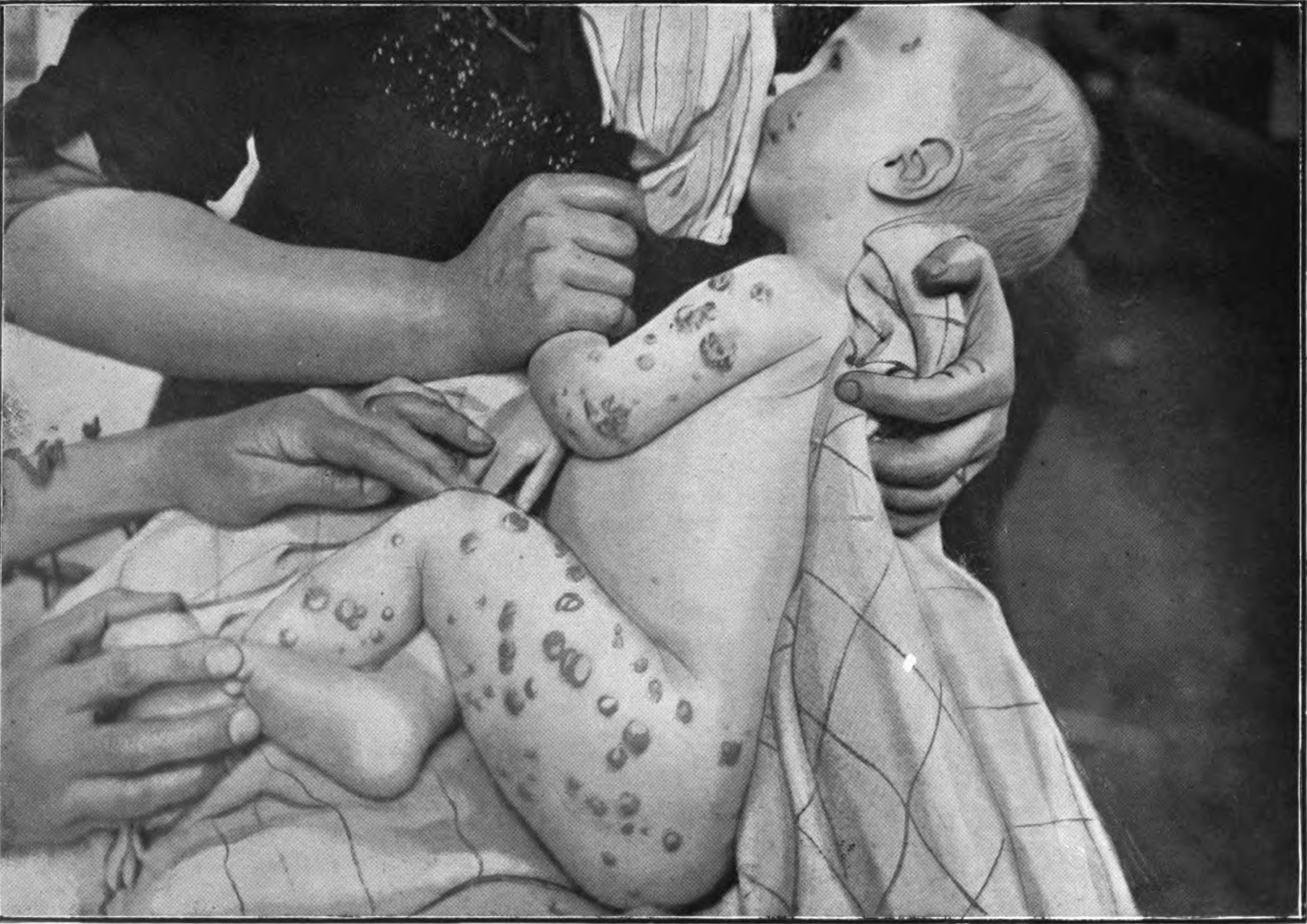
Bromide rash

=== Neurological and psychiatric ===
Neurological and psychiatric symptoms are widely variable. Common symptoms may include restlessness, irritability, ataxia, paranoia, confusion, both auditory and visual hallucinations, psychosis, weakness, stupor, and, in severe cases, coma.

=== Gastrointestinal ===
Gastrointestinal effects include nausea and vomiting as acute adverse effects. Chronic exposure may lead to anorexia or constipation.

=== Dermatological ===
Bromoderma is the skin expression of bromism and is more frequent in children than adults. It is typically due to ingestion of bromide-containing drugs; inadvertent ingestion of veterinary bromide-containing drugs by children may also occur. Bromoderma lesions include cherry angiomas, acneiform eruptions, exudative plaques, ulcerations, and erythematous rashes.

== Cause ==
High levels of bromide chronically impair the membrane of neurons, which progressively impairs neuronal transmission, leading to toxicity, known as bromism. Bromide has an elimination half-life of 9 to 12 days, which can lead to excessive accumulation. Doses of 0.5 to 1 gram per day of bromide can lead to bromism. Historically, the therapeutic dose of bromide is about 3 to 5 grams of bromide, thus explaining why chronic toxicity (bromism) was once so common. While significant and sometimes serious disturbances occur to neurologic, psychiatric, dermatological, and gastrointestinal functions, death is rare from bromism.

Dietary sodium bromide has caused bromism. In 2007, mass bromism affected 467 individuals in Cacuaco, Angola. It was traced to extremely high levels of sodium bromide (>80%) in table salt samples collected in the households of patients. A man was poisoned in 2025, after a suggestion of ChatGPT to replace sodium chloride in his diet with sodium bromide.

Bromism is caused by a neurotoxic effect on the brain which results in somnolence, psychosis, seizures, and delirium. Bromism has also been caused by excessive consumption of soft drinks that contains brominated vegetable oil, leading to headache, fatigue, ataxia, memory loss, and potentially inability to walk was observed in one case, where the patient drank Ruby Red Squirt soda about 8 L/day for several months.

== Diagnosis ==
In the presence of suggestive signs and symptoms, particularly neuropsychiatric symptoms, bromism is diagnosed by checking the serum chloride level, electrolytes, glucose, blood urea nitrogen and creatinine. Pseudohyperchloremia with a negative anion gap is highly suggestive of the diagnosis. Serum bromide levels may be elevated but improvement in symptoms does not always correlate with a similar decline in bromide concentrations as signs and symptoms depend on the brain time exposure of bromide. Bromine is also radiopaque, so an abdominal X-ray may also help in the diagnosis.

== Treatment ==
There are no specific antidotes or protocols for bromide poisoning of the body. Increased intake of regular salt and water, which increases the flow of the related chloride ion through the body, is one way of flushing out the bromide. Furosemide may help aid urinary excretion in individuals with renal impairment or where bromide toxicity is severe. In one case, hemodialysis was used to reduce bromide's half-life to 1.38 h, dramatically improving the patient's condition.
