= Bromide =

Chemical compound or ion

Names
- Systematic IUPAC name Bromide

Identifiers
| CAS Number | 24959-67-9 |
| 3D model (JSmol) | Interactive image |
| Beilstein Reference | 3587179 |
| ChEBI | CHEBI:15858 |
| ChEMBL | ChEMBL11685 |
| ChemSpider | 254 |
| Gmelin Reference | 14908 |
| KEGG | C01324 |
| PubChem CID | 259 |
| UNII | 952902IX06 |
- InChI: InChI=1S/BrH/h1H/p-1 Key: CPELXLSAUQHCOX-UHFFFAOYSA-M
- SMILES: [Br-]

Properties
| Chemical formula | Br^{−} |
| Molar mass | 79.904 g·mol^{−1} |
| Conjugate acid | Hydrogen bromide |

Thermochemistry
| Std molar entropy (S^{⦵}_{298}) | 82 J·mol^{−1}·K^{−1} |
| Std enthalpy of formation (Δ_{f}H^{⦵}_{298}) | −121 kJ·mol^{−1} |

Pharmacology
| ATC code | N05CM11 (WHO) |
- Pharmacokinetics
| Biological half-life | 12 d |

Related compounds
| Other anions | Fluoride Chloride; Iodide |
- Except where otherwise noted, data are given for materials in their standard state (at 25 °C [77 °F], 100 kPa). verify (what is ?) Infobox references

A bromide ion is the negatively charged form (Br^{−}) of the element bromine, a member of the halogens group on the periodic table. Most bromides are colorless. Bromides have many practical roles, being found in anticonvulsants, flame-retardant materials, and cell stains. Although uncommon, chronic toxicity from bromide can result in bromism, a syndrome with multiple neurological symptoms. Bromide toxicity can also cause a type of skin eruption, see potassium bromide. The bromide ion has an ionic radius of 196 pm.

== Natural occurrence ==
Bromide is present in typical seawater (35 PSU) with a concentration of around 65 mg/L, which is about 0.2% of all dissolved salts. Seafood and deep sea plants generally have higher levels than land-derived foods. Bromargyrite—natural, crystalline silver bromide—is the most common bromide mineral known but is still very rare. In addition to silver, bromine is also in minerals combined with mercury and copper.

== Formation and reactions of bromide ==
=== Dissociation of bromide salts ===
Bromide salts of alkali metal, alkaline earth metals, and many other metals dissolve in water (and even some alcohols and a few ethers) to give bromide ions. The classic case is sodium bromide, which fully dissociates in water:

NaBr → Na^{+} + Br^{−}

Hydrogen bromide, which is a diatomic molecule, takes on salt-like properties upon contact with water to give an ionic solution called hydrobromic acid. The process is often described simplistically as involving formation of the hydronium salt of bromide:

HBr + H_{2}O → H_{3}O^{+} + Br^{−}

=== Hydrolysis of bromine ===
Bromine readily reacts with water, i.e. it undergoes hydrolysis:

Br_{2} + H_{2}O → HOBr + HBr

This forms hypobromous acid (HOBr), and hydrobromic acid (HBr in water). The solution is called "bromine water". The hydrolysis of bromine is more favorable in the presence of base, for example sodium hydroxide:

Br_{2} + NaOH → NaOBr + NaBr

This reaction is analogous to the production of bleach, where chlorine is dissolved in the presence of sodium hydroxide.

=== Oxidation of bromide ===
One can test for a bromide ion by adding an oxidizer. One method uses dilute HNO_{3}.

Balard and Löwig's method can be used to extract bromine from seawater and certain brines. For samples testing for sufficient bromide concentration, addition of chlorine produces bromine (Br_{2}):

Cl_{2} + 2 Br^{−} → 2 Cl^{−} + Br_{2}

== Applications ==
Bromide's main commercial value is its use in producing organobromine compounds, which themselves are rather specialized. Organobromine compounds are commonly used as brominated flame retardants. Some organobromine flame retardants (not the bromide ion itself) were identified as persistent, bioaccumulative, and toxic to both humans and the environment and were suspected of causing neurobehavioral effects and endocrine disruption.

Many metal bromides are produced commercially, including LiBr, NaBr, NH_{4}Br, CuBr, ZnBr_{2} and AlBr_{3}. AgBr is used for the largely obsolete photographic gelatin silver process.

== Medicinal and veterinary uses ==
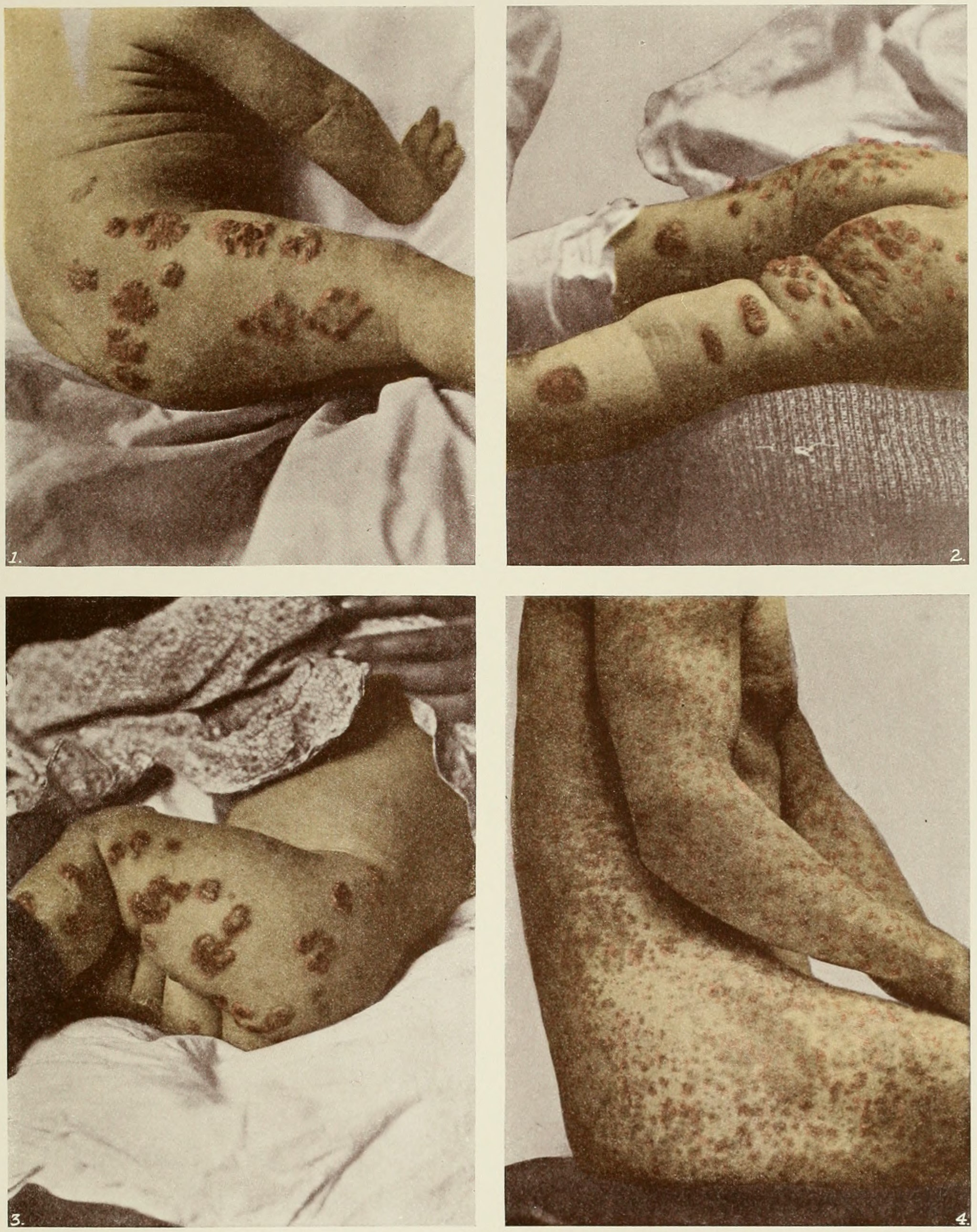
Dermatitis reactions to bromide, all except lower right

=== Sedation (phased out) ===
Lithium bromide was used as a sedative beginning in the early 1900s. However, it fell into disfavour in the 1940s due to the rising popularity of safer and more efficient sedatives (specifically, barbiturates) and when some heart patients died after using a salt substitute (see lithium chloride). Like lithium carbonate and lithium chloride, it was used as a treatment for bipolar disorder.

From 1954 to 1977, the Australian biochemist Shirley Andrews was researching safe ways to use lithium for the treatment of manic depressive illnesses while working at the Royal Park Psychiatric Hospital in Victoria. While conducting this research she discovered that bromide caused symptoms of mental illness, leading to a major reduction in its usage. She published her findings in 1965 in an article in the Medical Journal of Australia.

Bromide compounds, especially potassium bromide, were frequently used as sedatives in the 19th and early 20th centuries. Their use in over-the-counter sedatives and headache remedies (such as Bromo-Seltzer) in the United States extended to 1975 when bromides were withdrawn as ingredients due to chronic toxicity. This use gave the word "bromide" its colloquial connotation of a comforting cliché.

It has been said that during World War I, British soldiers were given bromide to curb their sexual urges.

=== Antiepileptic ===
The bromide ion is antiepileptic and as bromide salt, is used in veterinary medicine in the US. The kidneys excrete bromide ions. The half-life of bromide in the human body (12 days) is long compared with many pharmaceuticals, making dosing challenging to adjust. (A new dose may require several months to reach equilibrium.) Bromide ion concentrations in the cerebrospinal fluid are about 30% of those in blood and are strongly influenced by the body's chloride intake and metabolism.

Since bromide is still used in veterinary medicine in the United States, veterinary diagnostic labs can routinely measure blood bromide levels. However, this is not a conventional test in human medicine in the US since there are no FDA-approved uses for the bromide. Therapeutic bromide levels are measured in European countries like Germany, where bromide is still used therapeutically in human epilepsy.

=== Biocide ===
Bromide salts are used in hot tubs as mild germicidal agents to generate in situ hypobromite.

== Biochemistry ==
Bromide is rarely mentioned in the biochemical context. Some enzymes use bromide as substrate or as a cofactor.

=== Substrate ===
Bromoperoxidase enzymes use bromide (typically in seawater) to generate electrophilic brominating agents. Hundreds of organobromine compounds are generated by this process. Notable examples are bromoform, thousands of tons of which are produced annually in this way. The historical dye Tyrian purple is produced by similar enzymatic reactions.

=== Cofactor ===
In one specialized report, bromide is an essential cofactor in the peroxidising catalysis of sulfonimine crosslinks in collagen IV. This post-translational modification occurs in all animals and bromine is an essential trace element for humans.

Eosinophils need bromide for fighting multicellular parasites. Hypobromite is produced via eosinophil peroxidase, an enzyme that can use chloride but preferentially uses bromide.

The average concentration of bromide in human blood in Queensland, Australia, is 5.3±1.4 mg/L and varies with age and gender. Much higher levels may indicate exposure to brominated chemicals. It is also found in seafood.
