= Bromoderma =

- Other names: Bromoderma tuberosum
- Specialty: Dermatology

Bromoderma is a skin condition characterized by an eruption of papules and pustules on the skin. It is caused by hypersensitivity to bromides, such as those found in certain drugs. There is at least one reported case of bromoderma caused by excessive consumption of a soft drink (Ruby Red Squirt) containing brominated vegetable oil.

== Signs and symptoms ==
The disease's symptoms can range from a mild acneiform rash with papules and pustules to more severe conditions like panniculitis, ulcers, and vegetative nodules, also referred to as tuberous or vegetating bromoderma. Lesions usually affect the lower limbs, scalp, and face.

== Causes ==
One could characterize bromoderma as a kind of delayed hypersensitivity reaction, even though its pathogenesis is still unknown. Lesions can develop as soon as eight days after the medicine is first administered, but they typically do so after a prolonged period of use. High sebaceous gland concentrations on the skin are typically the site of lesions.

== Diagnosis ==
Skin lesions, a patient's history of using bromide, and the healing of lesions following drug withdrawal can all be used to make a diagnosis.

== See also ==
- Skin lesion
- List of cutaneous conditions
