= Potassium fluoride =

Ionic compound (KF)

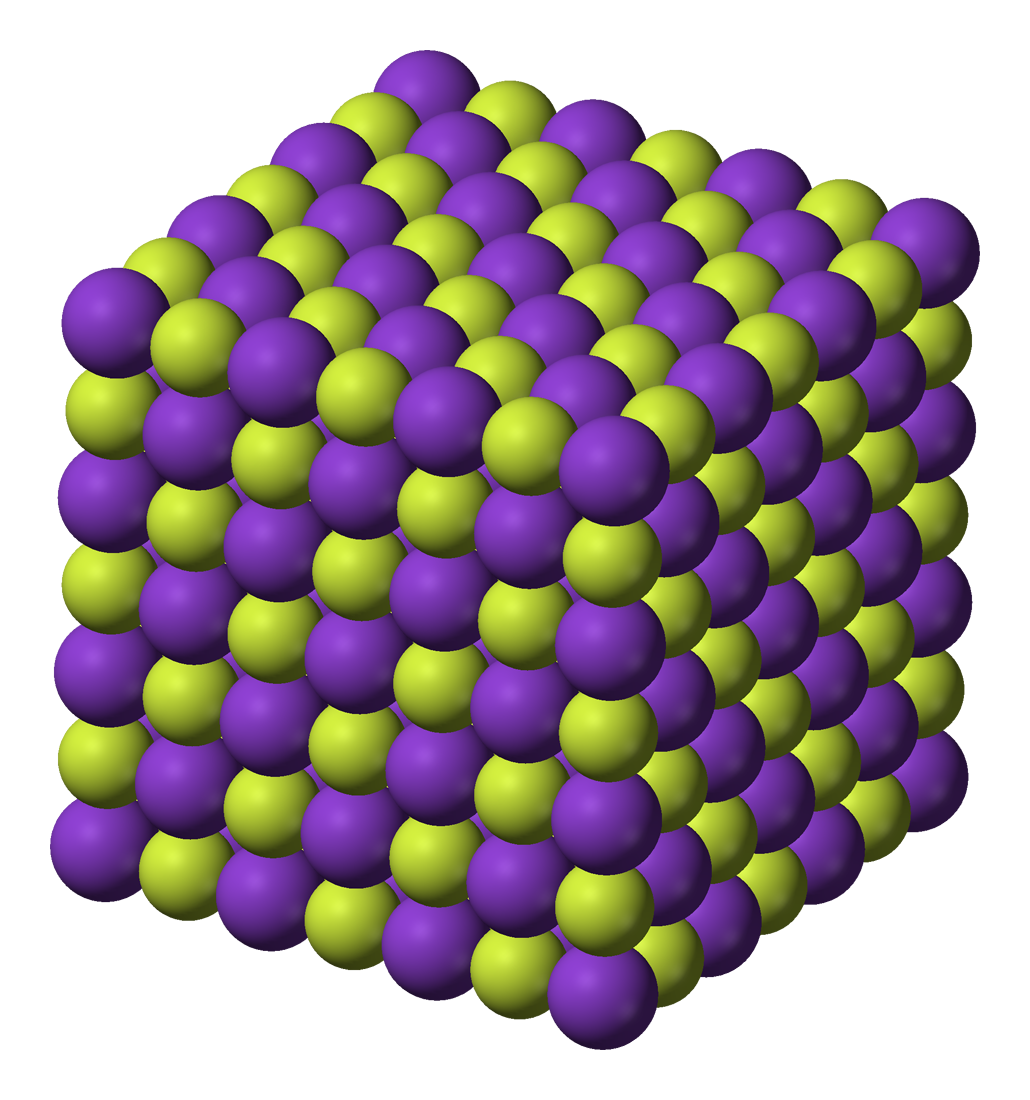

Names
- IUPAC name Potassium fluoride

Identifiers
CAS Number	7789-23-3 (anhydrous); 13455-21-5 (dihydrate)
3D model (JSmol)	Interactive image
ChEMBL	ChEMBL1644027
ChemSpider	23006
ECHA InfoCard	100.029.228
EC Number	232-151-5
PubChem CID	522689
RTECS number	TT0700000
UNII	9082WG1G3F; 95R1D12HEH (dihydrate)
CompTox Dashboard (EPA)	DTXSID8031940
- InChI: InChI=1S/FH.K/h1H;/q;+1/p-1 Key: NROKBHXJSPEDAR-UHFFFAOYSA-M; InChI=1S/FH.K/h1H;/q;+1/p-1 Key: NROKBHXJSPEDAR-REWHXWOFAI; Key: NROKBHXJSPEDAR-UHFFFAOYSA-M
- SMILES: [F-].[K+]

Properties
Chemical formula	KF
Molar mass	58.0967 g/mol (anhydrous); 94.1273 g/mol (dihydrate)
Appearance	colourless
Density	2.48 g/cm^{3}
Melting point	858 °C (1,576 °F; 1,131 K) (anhydrous); 41 °C (dihydrate); 19.3 °C (trihydrate)
Boiling point	1,502 °C (2,736 °F; 1,775 K)
Solubility in water	anhydrous: 92 g/100 mL (18 °C); 102 g/100 mL (25 °C) dihydrate: 349.3 g/100 mL (18 °C)
Solubility	soluble in HF insoluble in alcohol
Magnetic susceptibility (χ)	−23.6·10^{−6} cm^{3}/mol

Structure
Crystal structure	cubic

Hazards
- GHS labelling
Pictograms	(GHS06: Toxic)
Signal word	Danger
Hazard statements	H301, H311, H331
Precautionary statements	P261, P264, P270, P271, P280, P301+P310, P302+P352, P304+P340, P311, P312, P321, P322, P330, P361, P363, P403+P233, P405, P501
NFPA 704 (fire diamond)	3 0 0
Flash point	Non-flammable
- Lethal dose or concentration (LD, LC)
LD_{50} (median dose)	245 mg/kg (oral, rat)

Related compounds
Other anions	Potassium chloride Potassium bromide Potassium iodide
Other cations	Lithium fluoride Sodium fluoride Rubidium fluoride Caesium fluoride Francium fluoride
- Except where otherwise noted, data are given for materials in their standard state (at 25 °C [77 °F], 100 kPa). verify (what is ?) Infobox references

Potassium fluoride is the chemical compound with the formula KF. After hydrogen fluoride, KF is the primary source of the fluoride ion for applications in manufacturing and in chemistry. It is an alkali halide salt and occurs naturally as the rare mineral carobbiite. Solutions of KF will etch glass due to the formation of soluble fluorosilicates, although HF is more effective.

== Preparation ==
Potassium fluoride is prepared by reacting potassium carbonate with hydrofluoric acid. Evaporation of the solution forms crystals of potassium bifluoride. The bifluoride on heating yields potassium fluoride:

K_{2}CO_{3} + 4 HF → 2 KHF_{2} + CO_{2} ↑ + H_{2}O
KHF_{2} → KF + HF ↑

Platinum or heat resistant plastic containers are often used for these operations.

== Crystalline properties ==
KF crystallizes in the cubic NaCl crystal structure. The lattice parameter at room temperature is 0.266 nm.

== Applications in organic chemistry ==
In organic chemistry, KF can be used for the conversion of chlorocarbons into fluorocarbons, via the Finkelstein (alkyl halides) and Halex reactions (aryl chlorides). Such reactions usually employ polar solvents such as dimethyl formamide, ethylene glycol, and dimethyl sulfoxide. More efficient fluorination of aliphatic halides can be achieved with a combination of crown ether and bulky diols in acetonitrile solvent.

Potassium fluoride on alumina (KF/Al_{2}O_{3}) is a base used in organic synthesis. It was originally introduced in 1979 by Ando et al. for inducing alkylation reactions.

== Safety considerations ==
Like other sources of the fluoride ion, F^{−}, KF is poisonous, although lethal doses approach gram levels for humans. It is harmful by inhalation and ingestion. It is highly corrosive, and skin contact may cause severe burns.
