= Hydrogen bromide =

Chemical compound

- Skeletal formula of hydrogen bromide with the explicit hydrogen and a measurement added

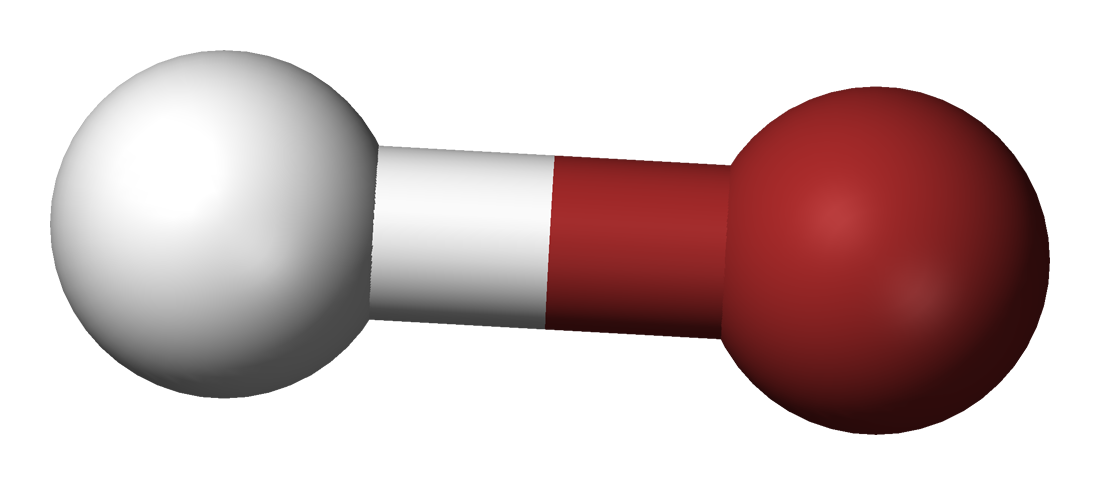
Ball-and-stick model of hydrogen bromide

Names
- IUPAC name Hydrogen bromide
- Preferred IUPAC name Bromane

Identifiers
CAS Number	10035-10-6
3D model (JSmol)	Interactive image
Beilstein Reference	3587158
ChEBI	CHEBI:47266
ChEMBL	ChEMBL1231461
ChemSpider	255
ECHA InfoCard	100.030.090
EC Number	233-113-0
KEGG	C13645
MeSH	Hydrobromic+Acid
PubChem CID	260
RTECS number	MW3850000
UNII	3IY7CNP8XJ
UN number	1048
CompTox Dashboard (EPA)	DTXSID0029713
- InChI: InChI=1S/BrH/h1H Key: CPELXLSAUQHCOX-UHFFFAOYSA-N
- SMILES: Br

Properties
Chemical formula	HBr
Molar mass	80.912 g·mol^{−1}
Appearance	Colorless gas
Odor	Acrid
Density	3.307 g/L (25 °C)
Melting point	−86.9 °C (−124.4 °F; 186.2 K)
Boiling point	−66.8 °C (−88.2 °F; 206.3 K)
Solubility in water	221 g/100 mL (0 °C); 204 g/100 mL (15 °C); 193 g/100 mL (20 °C); 130 g/100 mL (100 °C)
Solubility	Soluble in alcohol, organic solvents
Vapor pressure	2.308 MPa (at 21 °C)
Acidity (pK_{a})	−8.8 (±0.8); ~−9
Basicity (pK_{b})	~23
Conjugate acid	Bromonium
Conjugate base	Bromide
Refractive index (n_{D})	1.325

Structure
Molecular shape	Linear
Dipole moment	820 mD

Thermochemistry
Heat capacity (C)	350.7 mJ/(K·g)
Std molar entropy (S^{⦵}_{298})	198.696–198.704 J/(K·mol)
Std enthalpy of formation (Δ_{f}H^{⦵}_{298})	−36.45...−36.13 kJ/mol

Hazards
- Occupational safety and health (OHS/OSH)
Main hazards	Highly corrosive
- GHS labelling
Pictograms	(GHS04: Compressed Gas) (GHS05: Corrosive) (GHS07: Exclamation mark)
Signal word	Danger
Hazard statements	H314, H335
Precautionary statements	P260, P264, P271, P280, P301+P330+P331, P302+P361+P354, P304+P340, P305+P354+P338, P316, P319, P321, P363, P403+P233, P405, P501
NFPA 704 (fire diamond)	3 0 0 COR
- Lethal dose or concentration (LD, LC)
LC_{50} (median concentration)	2858 ppm (rat, 1 h); 814 ppm (mouse, 1 h)
- NIOSH (US health exposure limits)
PEL (Permissible)	TWA 3 ppm (10 mg/m^{3})
REL (Recommended)	TWA 3 ppm (10 mg/m^{3})
IDLH (Immediate danger)	30 ppm
Safety data sheet (SDS)	hazard.com physchem.ox.ac.uk

Related compounds
Related compounds	Hydrogen fluoride Hydrogen chloride Hydrogen iodide Hydrogen astatide
- Except where otherwise noted, data are given for materials in their standard state (at 25 °C [77 °F], 100 kPa). verify (what is ?) Infobox references

Hydrogen bromide is the inorganic compound with the formula HBr. It is a hydrogen halide consisting of hydrogen and bromine. A colorless gas, it dissolves in water, forming hydrobromic acid, which is saturated at 68.85% HBr by weight at room temperature. Aqueous solutions that are 47.6% HBr by mass form a constant-boiling azeotrope mixture that boils at 124.3 °C (255.7 °F). Boiling less concentrated solutions releases H_{2}O until the constant-boiling mixture composition is reached.

Hydrogen bromide, and its aqueous solution, hydrobromic acid, are commonly used reagents in the preparation of bromide compounds.

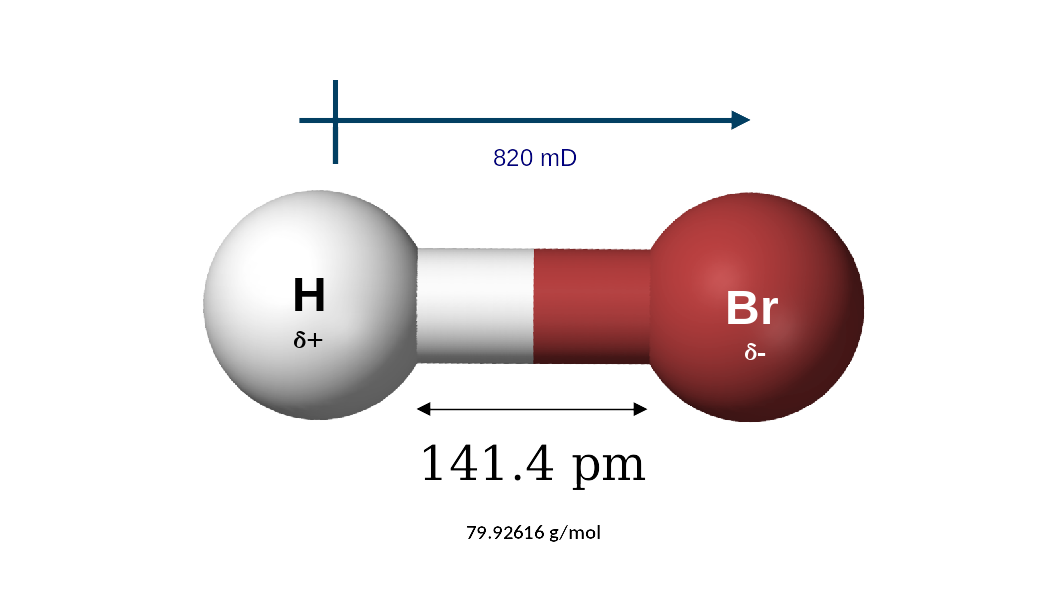
Molecular structure and dipole moment of hydrogen bromide (HBr)

== Reactions ==
=== Organic chemistry ===
Hydrogen bromide and hydrobromic acid are important reagents in the production of organobromine compounds. In an electrophilic addition reaction, HBr adds to alkenes:

RCH=CH_{2} + HBr → R−CHBr−CH_{3}

The resulting alkyl bromides are useful alkylating agents, e.g., as precursors to fatty amine derivatives. Related free radical additions to allyl chloride and styrene give 1-bromo-3-chloropropane and phenylethylbromide, respectively.

Hydrogen bromide reacts with dichloromethane to give bromochloromethane and dibromomethane, sequentially:

HBr + CH_{2}Cl_{2} → HCl + CH_{2}BrCl
HBr + CH_{2}BrCl → HCl + CH_{2}Br_{2}

These metathesis reactions illustrate the consumption of the stronger acid (HBr) and release of the weaker acid (HCl).

Allyl bromide is prepared by treating allyl alcohol with HBr:

CH_{2}=CHCH_{2}OH + HBr → CH_{2}=CHCH_{2}Br + H_{2}O

HBr adds to alkynes to yield bromoalkenes. The stereochemistry of this type of addition is usually anti:

RC≡CH + HBr → RC(Br)=CH_{2}

Also, HBr adds epoxides and lactones, resulting in ring-opening.

With triphenylphosphine, HBr gives triphenylphosphonium bromide, a solid "source" of HBr.

P(C_{6}H_{5})_{3} + HBr → [HP(C_{6}H_{5})_{3}]^{+}Br^{−}

=== Inorganic chemistry ===
Vanadium(III) bromide and molybdenum(IV) bromide were prepared by treatment of the higher chlorides with HBr. These reactions proceed by a combination halide exchange and redox reactions:

2 VCl_{4} + 8 HBr → 2 VBr_{3} + 8 HCl + Br_{2}

Hydrogen bromide is used for the production of anhydrous ferrous bromide by oxidation of metallic iron:

Fe + 2 HBr → FeBr_{2} + H_{2}

By contrast, use of hydrobromic acid gives the hexahydrate FeBr_{2}·(H_{2}O)_{6}.

== Industrial preparation ==
Hydrogen bromide (along with hydrobromic acid) is produced by combining hydrogen and bromine at temperatures between 200 and 400 °C. The reaction is typically catalyzed by platinum or asbestos.

== Laboratory synthesis ==
HBr can be prepared by distillation of a solution of sodium bromide or potassium bromide with phosphoric acid or sulfuric acid:

KBr + H_{2}SO_{4} → KHSO_{4} + HBr

Concentrated sulfuric acid is less effective because it oxidizes HBr to bromine:

2 HBr + H_{2}SO_{4} → Br_{2} + SO_{2} + 2 H_{2}O

The acid may be prepared by:

- reaction of bromine with water and sulfur:
  2 Br_{2} + S + 2 H_{2}O → 4 HBr + SO_{2}
- bromination of tetralin:
  C_{10}H_{12} + 4 Br_{2} → C_{10}H_{8}Br_{4} + 4 HBr
- reduction of bromine with phosphorous acid:
  Br_{2} + H_{3}PO_{3} + H_{2}O → H_{3}PO_{4} + 2 HBr

Anhydrous hydrogen bromide can also be produced on a small scale by thermolysis of triphenylphosphonium bromide in refluxing xylene.

Hydrogen bromide prepared by the above methods can be contaminated with Br_{2}, which can be removed by passing the gas through a solution of phenol at room temperature in tetrachloromethane or other suitable solvent (producing 2,4,6-tribromophenol and generating more HBr in the process) or through copper turnings or copper gauze at high temperature.

== Safety ==
HBr is highly corrosive and, if inhaled, can cause lung damage.
