= Carobbiite =

Mineral

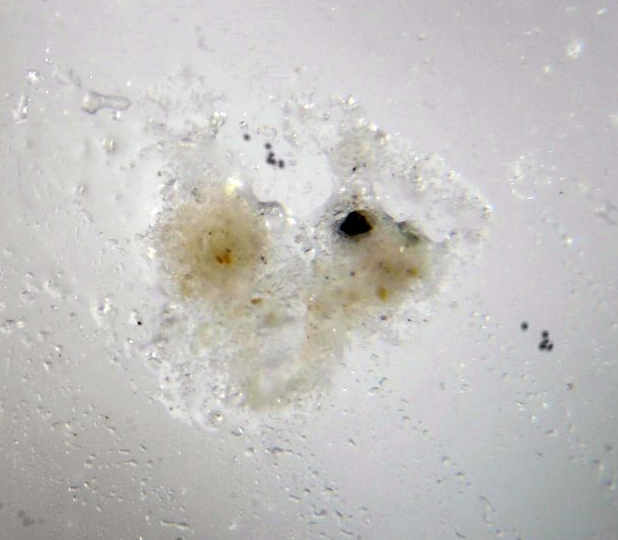
- Carobbiite

General
- Category: Minerals
- Formula: KF
- IMA symbol: Crb
- Strunz classification: 3.AA.20
- Dana classification: 9.1.1.4
- Crystal system: Isometric - Hexoctahedral
- Crystal class: m3m (4/m 3 2/m) - Hexoctahedral
- Space group: Cubic
- Unit cell: 152.27 Å³

Identification
- Formula mass: 58.10 gm
- Colour: Colorless
- Cleavage: Distinct/Good
- Mohs scale hardness: 2-2.5
- Luster: Vitreous (Glassy)
- Streak: White
- Diaphaneity: Transparent
- Specific gravity: 2.505
- Density: 2.524
- Optical properties: Isotropic, n=1.362.

Carobbiite, chemical formula KF (potassium fluoride), is a rare, soft (Mohs 2 - 2.5), colourless cubic mineral. It is found at Monte Somma, Somma-Vesuvius Complex, Province of Naples, Campania, Italy. It was discovered in 1956 by Italian geologist Guido Carobbi (1900–1983). It has also been reported from Hokkaido, Japan.
