= Lithium bromide =

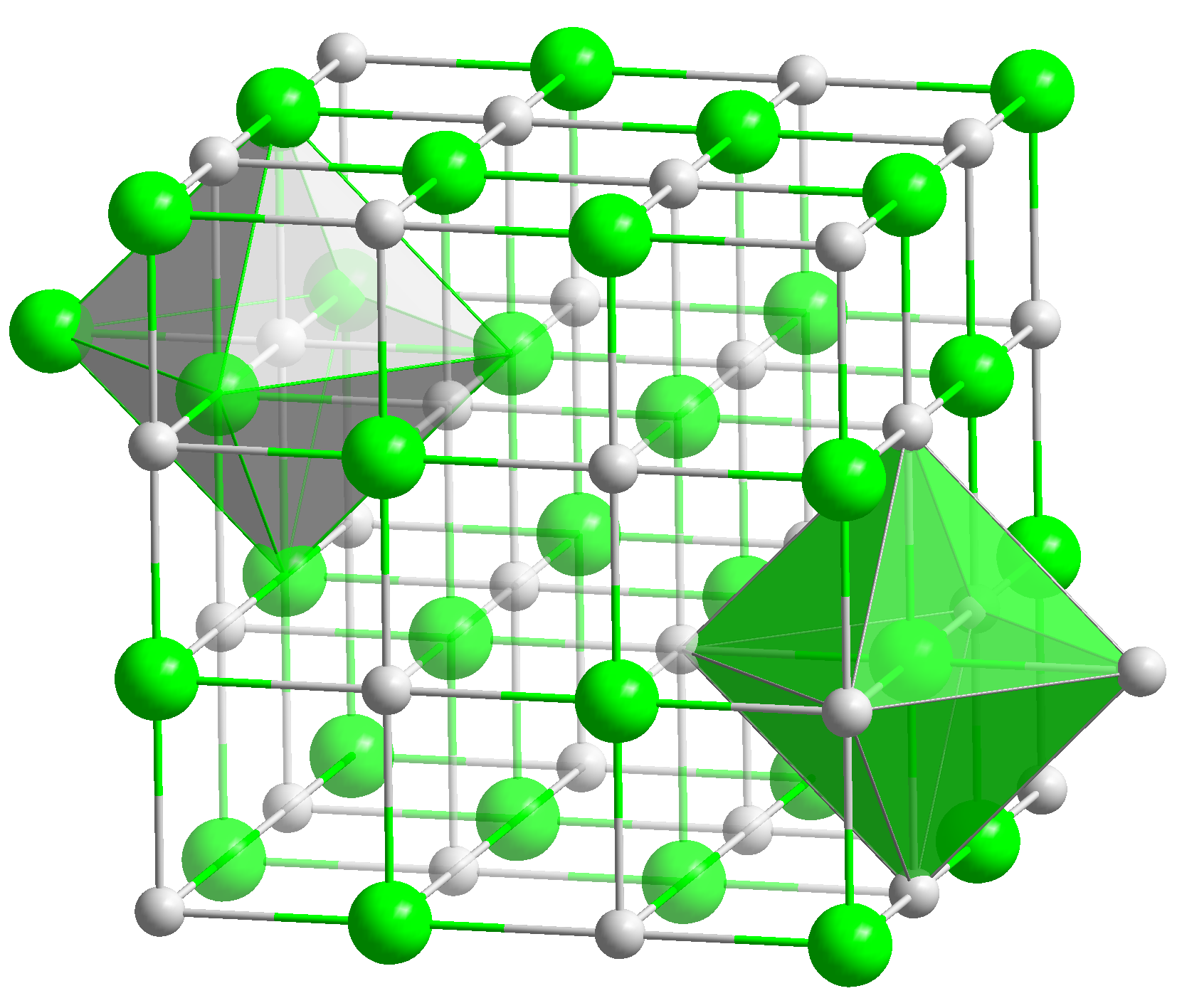
- __ Li^{+} __ Br^{−}

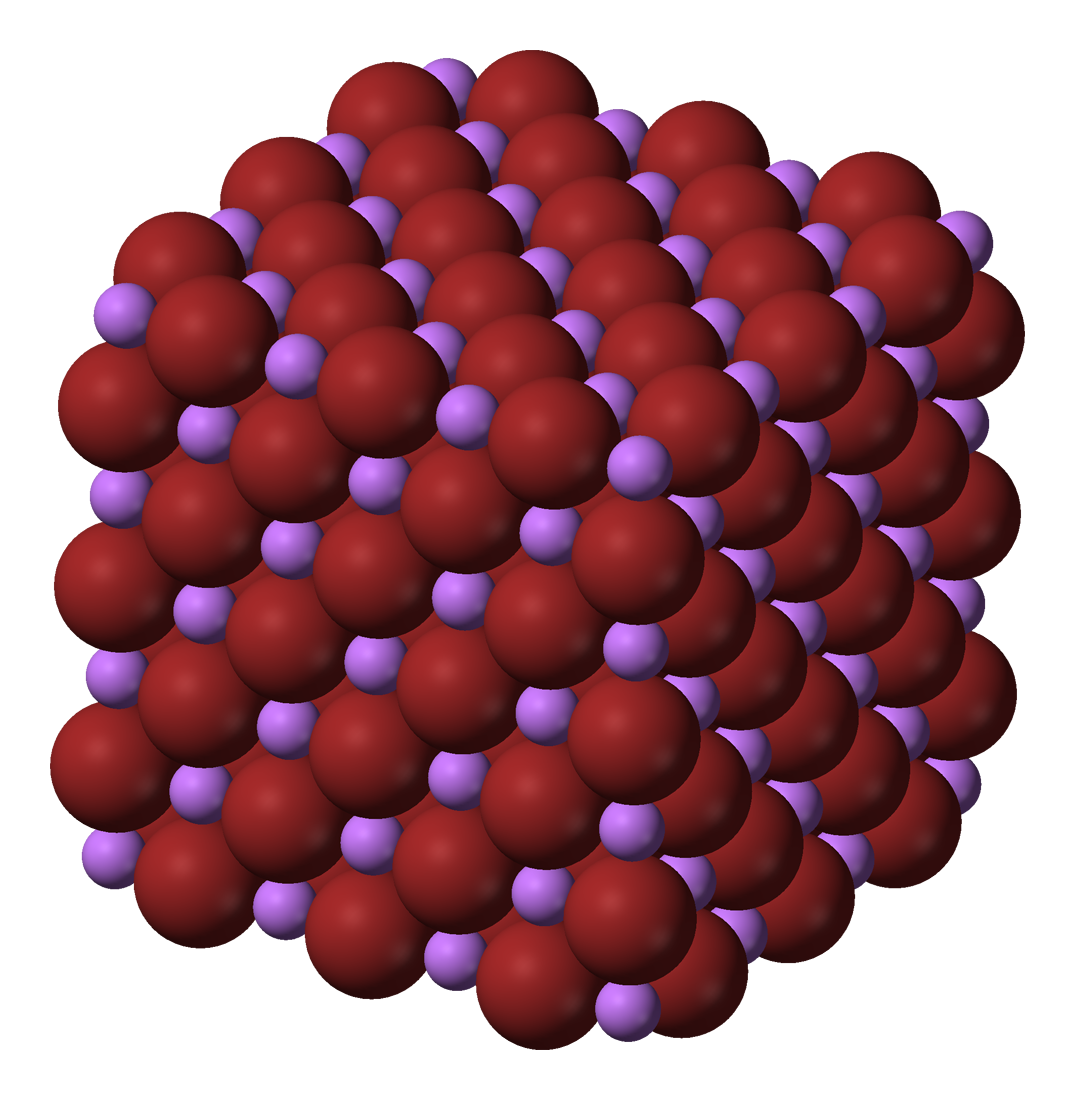

Names
- IUPAC name Lithium bromide

Identifiers
CAS Number	7550-35-8
3D model (JSmol)	Interactive image
ChemSpider	74049
ECHA InfoCard	100.028.582
EC Number	231-439-8
PubChem CID	82050
RTECS number	OJ5755000
UNII	864G646I84
CompTox Dashboard (EPA)	DTXSID20892222
- InChI: InChI=1S/BrH.Li/h1H;/q;+1/p-1 Key: AMXOYNBUYSYVKV-UHFFFAOYSA-M; InChI=1/BrH.Li/h1H;/q;+1/p-1 Key: AMXOYNBUYSYVKV-REWHXWOFAS
- SMILES: [Li+].[Br-]

Properties
Chemical formula	LiBr
Molar mass	86.845 g/mol
Appearance	White hygroscopic solid
Density	3.464 g/cm^{3}
Melting point	550 °C (1,022 °F; 823 K)
Boiling point	1,300 °C (2,370 °F; 1,570 K)
Solubility in water	143 g/100 mL (0 °C); 166.7 g/100 mL (20 °C); 266 g/100 mL (100 °C)
Solubility	soluble in methanol, ethanol, ether, acetone slightly soluble in pyridine
Magnetic susceptibility (χ)	−34.3·10^{−6} cm^{3}/mol
Refractive index (n_{D})	1.7843 (589 nm)

Structure
Crystal structure	Cubic, Pearson symbol cF8, No. 225
Space group	Fm3̅m
Lattice constant	a = 0.5496 nm

Thermochemistry
Std molar entropy (S^{⦵}_{298})	74.3 J/mol K
Std enthalpy of formation (Δ_{f}H^{⦵}_{298})	−351.2 kJ/mol
Gibbs free energy (Δ_{f}G^{⦵})	−342.0 kJ/mol

Hazards
- GHS labelling
Pictograms	(GHS07: Exclamation mark)
Signal word	Warning
Hazard statements	H315, H317, H319
NFPA 704 (fire diamond)	2 0 0 W
Flash point	Not-flammable
- Lethal dose or concentration (LD, LC)
LD_{50} (median dose)	1800 mg/kg (oral, rat)

Related compounds
Other anions	Lithium fluoride Lithium chloride Lithium iodide
Other cations	Sodium bromide Potassium bromide Rubidium bromide Caesium bromide
- Except where otherwise noted, data are given for materials in their standard state (at 25 °C [77 °F], 100 kPa). verify (what is ?) Infobox references

Lithium bromide (LiBr) is a chemical compound of lithium and bromine. Its extreme hygroscopic character makes LiBr useful as a desiccant in certain air conditioning systems.

== Production and properties ==
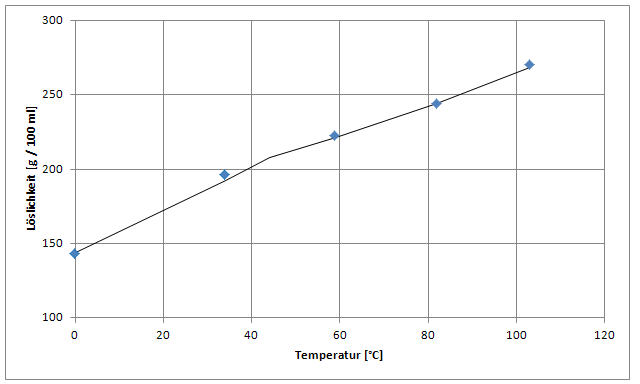
Solubility of LiBr in water as a function of temperature

Phase diagram of LiBr

LiBr is prepared by treating an aqueous suspension of lithium carbonate with hydrobromic acid or by reacting lithium hydroxide with bromine. It forms several crystalline hydrates, unlike the other alkali metal bromides.

Lithium hydroxide and hydrobromic acid (aqueous solution of hydrogen bromide) will precipitate lithium bromide in the presence of water.

LiOH + HBr → LiBr + H_{2}O

== Uses ==
A 50–60% aqueous solution of lithium bromide is used in air-conditioning systems as desiccant. It is also used in absorption chilling along with water (see absorption refrigerator). Solid LiBr is a useful reagent in organic synthesis. It is included into oxidation and hydroformylation catalysts; it is also used for deprotonation and dehydration of organic compounds containing acidic protons, and for the purification of steroids and prostaglandins.

=== Medical applications ===
Lithium bromide was used as a sedative beginning in the early 1900s, but it fell into disfavor in the 1940s as newer sedatives became available and when some heart patients died after using the salt substitute lithium chloride. Like lithium carbonate and lithium chloride, it was used as treatment for bipolar disorder.

== Hazards ==
Lithium salts are psychoactive and somewhat corrosive. Heat is quickly generated when lithium bromide is dissolved into water because it has a negative enthalpy of solution.

== Cited sources ==
- Haynes, William M., ed. (2016). CRC Handbook of Chemistry and Physics (97th ed.). CRC Press. ISBN 9781498754293.
