= Caesium fluoride =

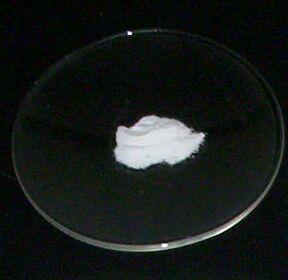
- Caesium fluoride

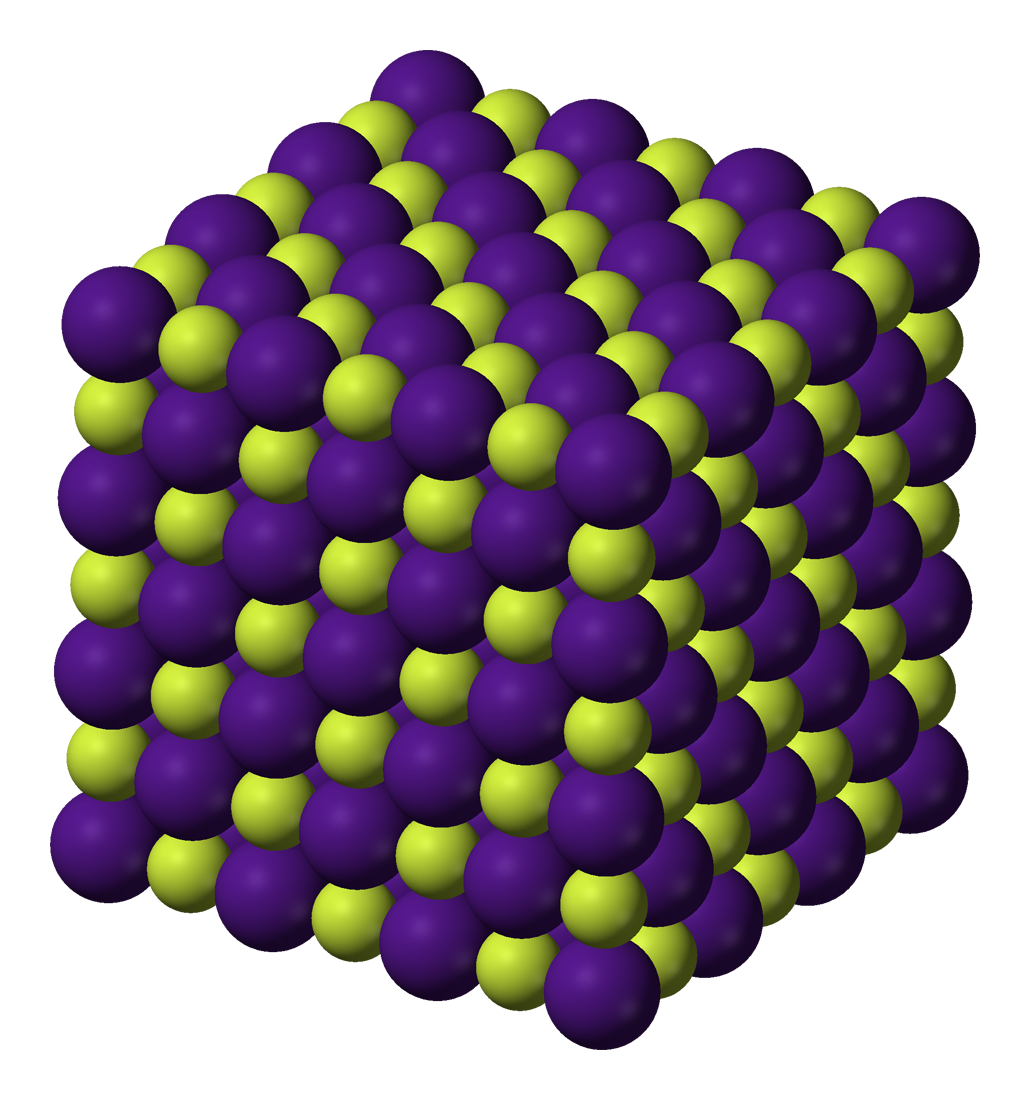
- Caesium fluoride

Names
- IUPAC name Caesium fluoride
- Other names Cesium fluoride

Identifiers
CAS Number	13400-13-0
3D model (JSmol)	Interactive image
ChemSpider	24179
ECHA InfoCard	100.033.156
EC Number	236-487-3
PubChem CID	25953
RTECS number	FK9650000
UNII	T76A371HJR
CompTox Dashboard (EPA)	DTXSID30893927
- InChI: InChI=1S/Cs.FH/h;1H/q+1;/p-1 Key: XJHCXCQVJFPJIK-UHFFFAOYSA-M; InChI=1/Cs.FH/h;1H/q+1;/p-1 Key: XJHCXCQVJFPJIK-REWHXWOFAY
- SMILES: [F-].[Cs+]

Properties
Chemical formula	CsF
Molar mass	151.903 g/mol
Appearance	white crystalline solid
Density	4.64 g/cm^{3}
Melting point	703 °C (1,297 °F; 976 K)
Boiling point	1,251 °C (2,284 °F; 1,524 K) (2,284 °F; 1,524 K)
Solubility in water	573.0 g/100 mL (25 °C)
Solubility	Insoluble in acetone, diethyl ether, pyridine and ethanol 191 g/100 mL in methanol.
Basicity (pK_{b})	−744 kJ/mol
Magnetic susceptibility (χ)	−44.5·10^{−6} cm^{3}/mol
Refractive index (n_{D})	1.477

Structure
Crystal structure	cubic, cF8
Space group	Fm3̅m, No. 225
Lattice constant	a = 0.6008 nm
Lattice volume (V)	0.2169 nm^{3}
Formula units (Z)	4
Coordination geometry	Octahedral
Dipole moment	7.9 D

Thermochemistry
Heat capacity (C)	51.1 J/mol·K
Std molar entropy (S^{⦵}_{298})	92.8 J/mol·K
Std enthalpy of formation (Δ_{f}H^{⦵}_{298})	−553.5 kJ/mol
Gibbs free energy (Δ_{f}G^{⦵})	−525.5 kJ/mol

Hazards
- Occupational safety and health (OHS/OSH)
Main hazards	toxic
- GHS labelling
Pictograms	(GHS05: Corrosive) (GHS06: Toxic) (GHS08: Health hazard)
Signal word	Danger
Hazard statements	H301, H311, H315, H318, H331, H361f
Precautionary statements	P201, P202, P260, P264, P270, P271, P280, P281, P301+P310, P301+P330+P331, P302+P352, P303+P361+P353, P304+P340, P305+P351+P338, P308+P313, P310, P311, P312, P321, P322, P330, P332+P313, P361, P362, P363, P403+P233, P405, P501
NFPA 704 (fire diamond)	3 0 0
Flash point	Non-flammable
Safety data sheet (SDS)	External MSDS

Related compounds
Other anions	Caesium chloride Caesium bromide Caesium iodide Caesium astatide
Other cations	Lithium fluoride Sodium fluoride Potassium fluoride Rubidium fluoride Francium fluoride
- Except where otherwise noted, data are given for materials in their standard state (at 25 °C [77 °F], 100 kPa). verify (what is ?) Infobox references

Caesium fluoride (cesium fluoride in American English) is an inorganic compound with the formula CsF. A hygroscopic white salt, caesium fluoride is used in the synthesis of organic compounds as a source of the fluoride anion. The compound is noteworthy from the pedagogical perspective as caesium also has the highest electropositivity of all commonly available elements and fluorine has the highest electronegativity.

== Synthesis and properties ==
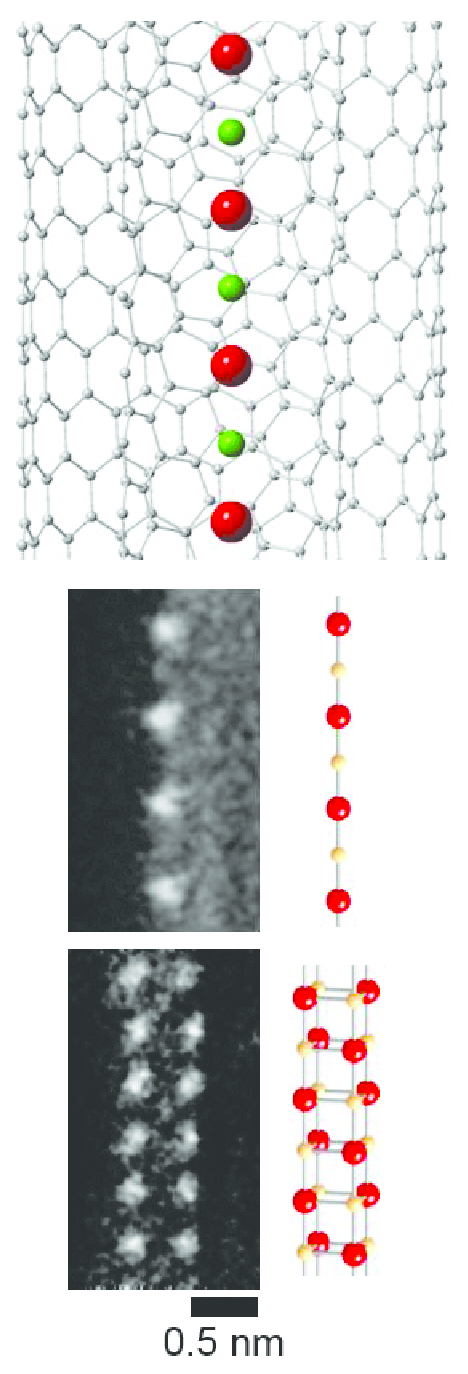
Crystalline CsF chains grown inside double-wall carbon nanotubes.

Caesium fluoride can be prepared by the reaction of caesium hydroxide (CsOH) with hydrofluoric acid (HF) and the resulting salt can then be purified by recrystallization. The reaction is shown below:

CsOH + HF → CsF + H_{2}O

Using the same reaction, another way to create caesium fluoride is to treat caesium carbonate (Cs_{2}CO_{3}) with hydrofluoric acid and again, the resulting salt can then be purified by recrystallization. The reaction is shown below:

Cs_{2}CO_{3} + 2 HF → 2 CsF + H_{2}O + CO_{2}

CsF is more soluble than sodium fluoride or potassium fluoride in organic solvents. It is available in its anhydrous form, and if water has been absorbed, it is easy to dry by heating at 100 °C for two hours in vacuo. CsF reaches a vapor pressure of 1 kilopascal at 825 °C, 10 kPa at 999 °C, and 100 kPa at 1249 °C.

== Structure ==
Caesium fluoride has the halite structure, which means that the Cs^{+} and F^{−} pack in a cubic closest packed array as do Na^{+} and Cl^{−} in sodium chloride. Unlike sodium chloride, caesium fluoride's anion is smaller than its cation, so it is the anion size that sterically inhibits larger coordination numbers than six under normally encountered conditions. A larger halide ion would allow for the eight-coordination seen in other caesium halide crystals.

== Applications in organic synthesis ==
Being highly dissociated, CsF is a more reactive source of fluoride than related alkali metal salts. CsF is an alternative to tetra-n-butylammonium fluoride (TBAF) and TAS-fluoride (TASF).

=== As a base ===
As with other soluble fluorides, CsF is moderately basic, because HF is a weak acid. The low nucleophilicity of fluoride means it can be a useful base in organic chemistry. CsF gives higher yields in Knoevenagel condensation reactions than KF or NaF.

=== Formation of Cs-F bonds ===
Caesium fluoride serves as a source of fluoride in organofluorine chemistry. Similarly to potassium fluoride, CsF reacts with hexafluoroacetone to form a stable perfluoroalkoxide salt. It will convert electron-deficient aryl chlorides to aryl fluorides (Halex process), although potassium fluoride is more commonly used.

=== Deprotection agent ===
Due to the strength of the Si–F bond, fluoride is useful for desilylation reactions, i.e., cleavage of Si-O bonds in organic synthesis. CsF is commonly used for such reactions. Solutions of caesium fluoride in THF or DMF attack a wide variety of organosilicon compounds to produce an organosilicon fluoride and a carbanion, which can then react with electrophiles, for example:

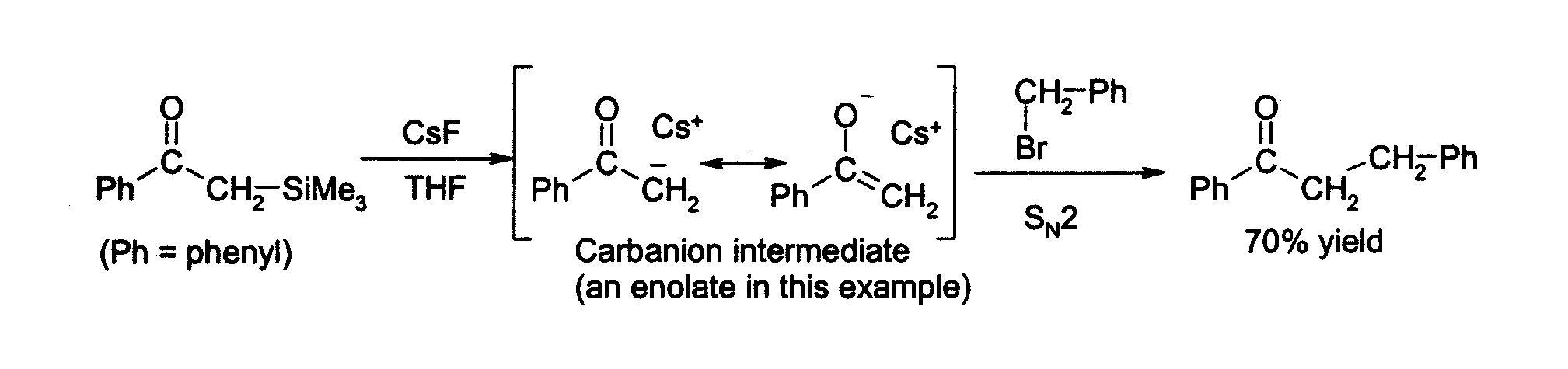

== Precautions ==
Like other soluble fluorides, CsF is moderately toxic. Contact with acid should be avoided, as this forms highly toxic/corrosive hydrofluoric acid. The caesium ion (Cs^{+}) and caesium chloride are generally not considered toxic.
