= Sodium bromide =

Inorganic salt: NaBr

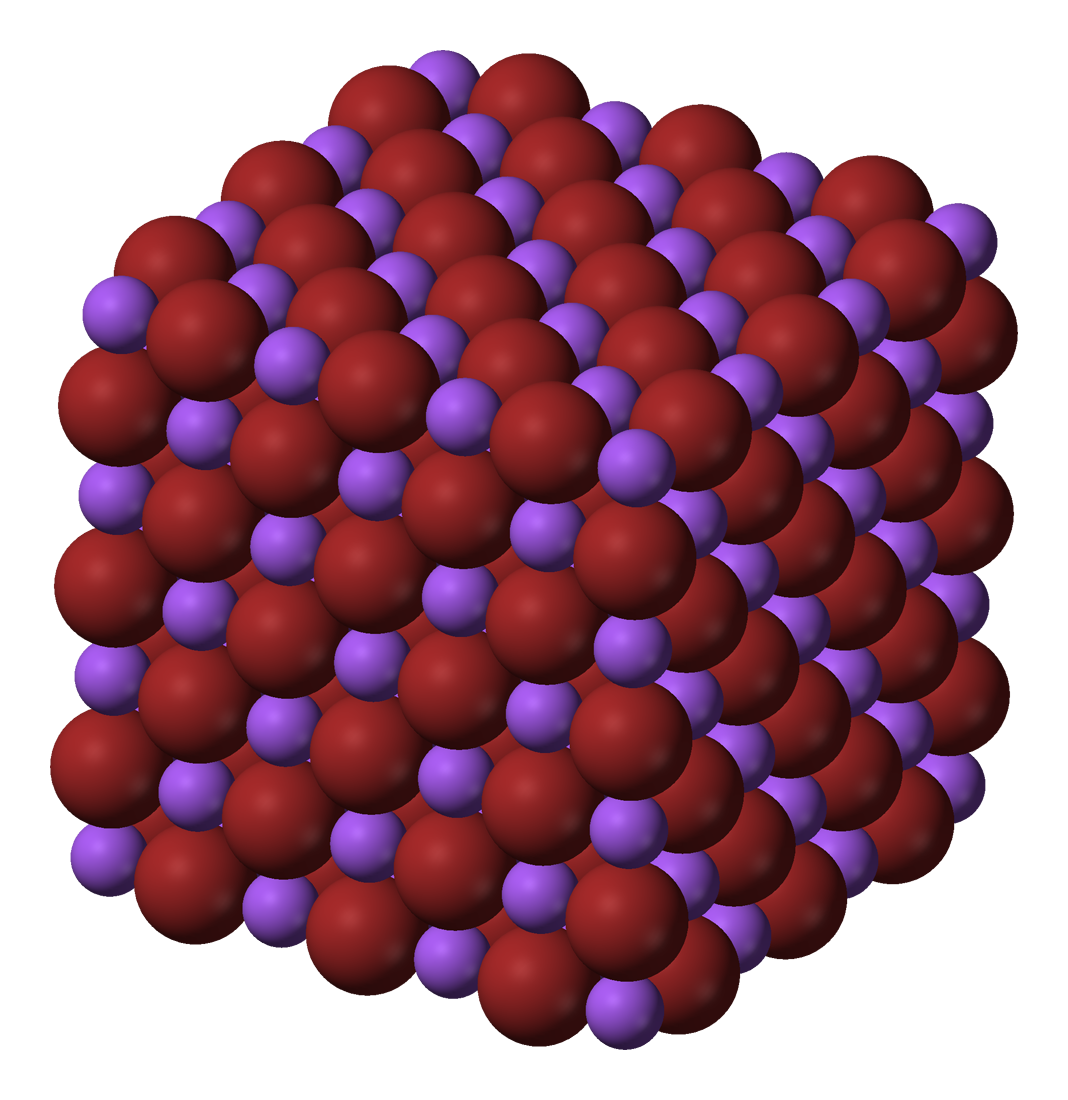
- 3D model of sodium bromide

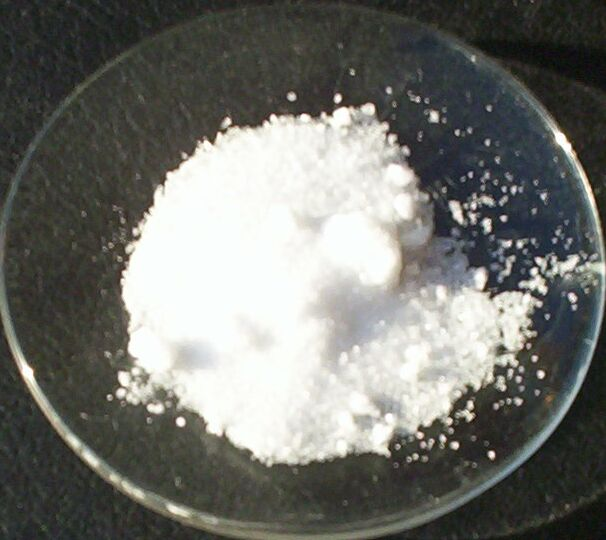
- Sodium bromide powder

Names
- IUPAC name Sodium bromide

Identifiers
CAS Number	anhydrous: 7647-15-6; dihydrate: 13466-08-5
3D model (JSmol)	anhydrous: Interactive image
ChEMBL	anhydrous: ChEMBL1644694
ChemSpider	anhydrous: 22712
ECHA InfoCard	100.028.727
PubChem CID	anhydrous: 253881
RTECS number	anhydrous: VZ3150000
UNII	anhydrous: LC1V549NOM
CompTox Dashboard (EPA)	anhydrous: DTXSID3034903
- InChI: InChI=1S/BrH.Na/h1H;/q;+1/p-1 Key: JHJLBTNAGRQEKS-UHFFFAOYSA-M; anhydrous: InChI=1/BrH.Na/h1H;/q;+1/p-1 Key: JHJLBTNAGRQEKS-REWHXWOFAR
- SMILES: anhydrous: [Na+].[Br-]

Properties
Chemical formula	NaBr
Molar mass	102.894 g·mol^{−1}
Appearance	White powder, hygroscopic
Density	3.21 g/cm^{3} (anhydrous); 2.18 g/cm^{3} (dihydrate)
Melting point	747 °C (1,377 °F; 1,020 K) (anhydrous); 36 °C (97 °F; 309 K) (dihydrate, decomposes)
Boiling point	1,390 °C (2,530 °F; 1,660 K)
Solubility in water	71.35 g/100 mL (−20 °C); 79.52 g/100 mL (0 °C); 94.32 g/100 mL (25 °C); 104.9 g/100 mL (40 °C); 116.2 g/100 mL (100 °C)
Solubility	Soluble in alcohol, liquid ammonia, pyridine, hydrazine, SO_{2} Insoluble in acetone, acetonitrile
Solubility in methanol	17.3 g/100 g (0 °C); 16.8 g/100 g (20 °C); 16.1 g/100 g (40 °C); 15.3 g/100 g (60 °C)
Solubility in ethanol	2.45 g/100 g (0 °C); 2.32 g/100 g (20 °C); 2.29 g/100 g (30 °C); 2.35 g/100 g (70 °C)
Solubility in formic acid	19.3 g/100 g (18 °C); 19.4 g/100 g (25 °C)
Solubility in glycerol	38.7 g/100 g (20 °C)
Solubility in dimethylformamide	3.2 g/100 g (10.3 °C)
Vapor pressure	1 torr (806 °C); 5 torr (903 °C)
Magnetic susceptibility (χ)	−41.0·10^{−6} cm^{3}/mol
Thermal conductivity	5.6 W/(m·K) (150 K)
Refractive index (n_{D})	1.6428 (24 °C) n_{KrF} = 1.8467 (24 °C) n_{He–Ne} = 1.6389 (24 °C)
Viscosity	1.42 cP (762 °C); 1.08 cP (857 °C); 0.96 cP (937 °C)

Structure
Crystal structure	Cubic
Lattice constant	a = 5.97 Å

Thermochemistry
Heat capacity (C)	51.4 J/(mol·K)
Std molar entropy (S^{⦵}_{298})	86.82 J/(mol·K)
Std enthalpy of formation (Δ_{f}H^{⦵}_{298})	−361.41 kJ/mol
Gibbs free energy (Δ_{f}G^{⦵})	−349.3 kJ/mol

Pharmacology
Legal status	AU: S4 (Prescription only) /S5

Hazards
NFPA 704 (fire diamond)	2 0 0
Flash point	800 °C (1,470 °F; 1,070 K)
- Lethal dose or concentration (LD, LC)
LD_{50} (median dose)	3500 mg/kg (rats, oral)
Safety data sheet (SDS)	External MSDS

Related compounds
Other anions	Sodium fluoride; Sodium chloride; Sodium iodide; Sodium astatide
Other cations	Lithium bromide; Potassium bromide; Rubidium bromide; Caesium bromide; Francium bromide
- Except where otherwise noted, data are given for materials in their standard state (at 25 °C [77 °F], 100 kPa). verify (what is ?) Infobox references

Sodium bromide is an inorganic compound with the formula NaBr. It is a high-melting white, crystalline solid that resembles sodium chloride. It is a widely used source of the bromide ion and has many applications.

In repeated doses it is toxic to humans, leading to bromism, which may include symptoms such as skin rashes, drowsiness, nausea, and hallucinations.

== Synthesis, structure, reactions ==
NaBr crystallizes in the same cubic motif as NaCl, NaF and NaI. The anhydrous salt crystallizes above 50.7 °C. Dihydrate salt (NaBr·2H_{2}O) crystallize out of water solution below 50.7 °C.

NaBr is produced by treating sodium hydroxide with hydrogen bromide.

Sodium bromide can be used as a source of the chemical element bromine. This can be accomplished by treating an aqueous solution of NaBr with chlorine gas:

2 NaBr + Cl_{2} → Br_{2} + 2 NaCl

== Applications ==
Sodium bromide is the most useful inorganic bromide in industry. It is also used as a catalyst in TEMPO-mediated oxidation reactions.

=== Medicine ===
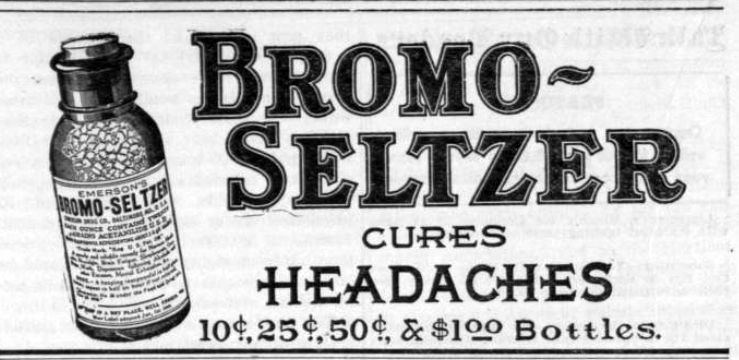
Bromo-Seltzer newspaper ad (1908)

Also known as Sedoneural, sodium bromide has been used as a hypnotic, anticonvulsant, and sedative in medicine, widely used as an anticonvulsant and a sedative in the late 19th and early 20th centuries. Its action is due to the bromide ion, and for this reason potassium bromide is equally effective. In 1975, bromides were removed from drugs in the U.S. such as Bromo-Seltzer due to toxicity.

=== Preparation of other bromine compounds ===
Sodium bromide is widely used for the preparation of other bromides in organic synthesis and other areas. It is a source of the bromide nucleophile to convert alkyl chlorides to more reactive alkyl bromides by the Finkelstein reaction:

NaBr + RCl → RBr + NaCl (R = alkyl)

Once a large need in photography, but now shrinking, the photosensitive salt silver bromide is prepared using NaBr.

=== Disinfectant ===
Sodium bromide is used in conjunction with chlorine as a disinfectant for hot tubs and swimming pools.

=== Petroleum industry ===
Because of its high solubility in water (943.2 g/L or 9.16 mol/L, at 25 °C) sodium bromide is used to prepare dense drilling fluids used in oil wells to compensate a possible overpressure arising in the fluid column and to counteract the associated trend to blow out. The presence of the sodium cation also causes the bentonite added to the drilling fluid to swell, while the high ionic strength induces bentonite flocculation.

== Safety ==
NaBr has a very low toxicity with an oral LD_{50} estimated at 3.5 g/kg for rats. However, this is a single-dose value. Bromide ions are a cumulative toxin with a relatively long biological half-life (in excess of a week in humans): see potassium bromide.

Human consumption can lead to bromism.
