= Rubidium fluoride =

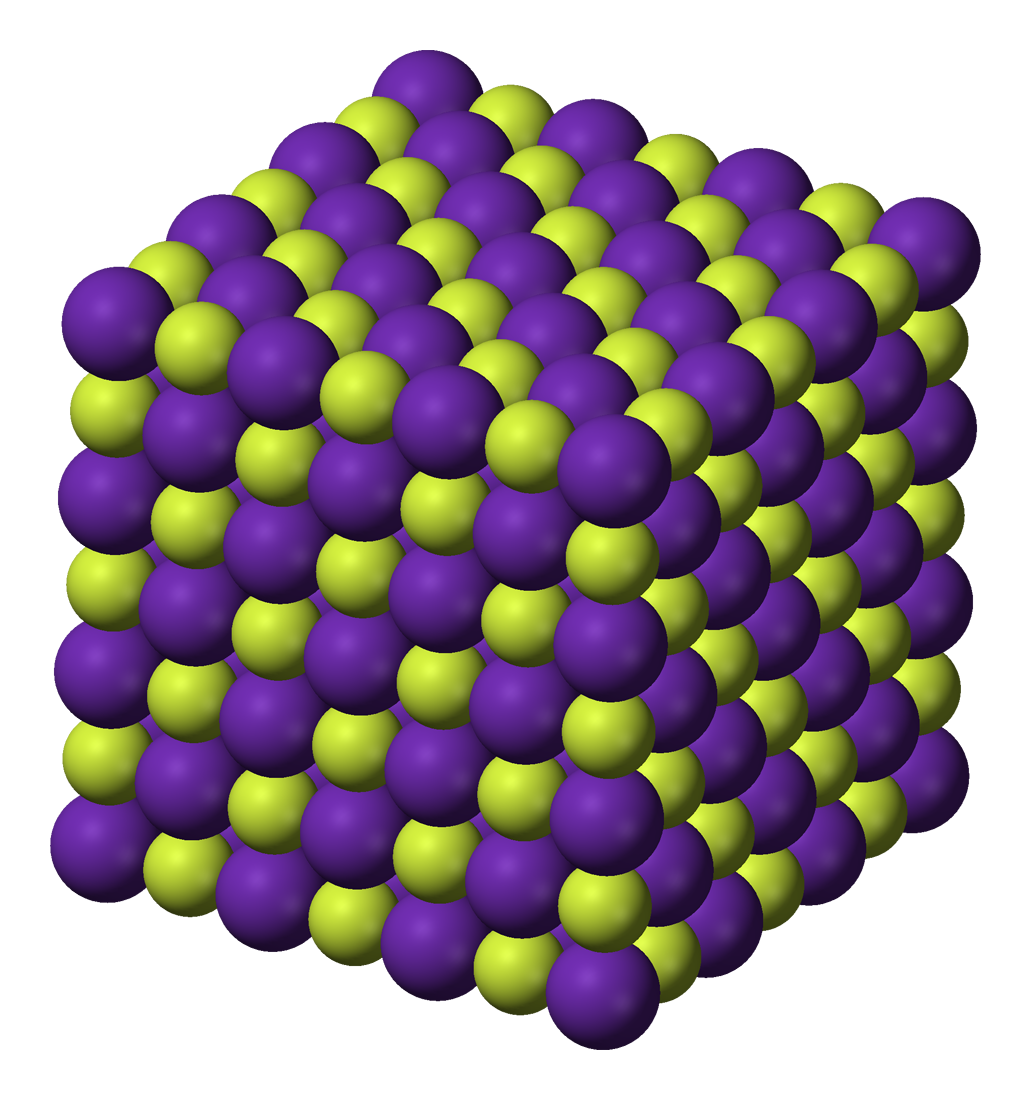

Names
- Other names Rubidium(I) Fluoride

Identifiers
CAS Number	13446-74-7
3D model (JSmol)	Interactive image
ChemSpider	75311
ECHA InfoCard	100.033.262
PubChem CID	83473
RTECS number	VL8740000
UNII	63564TNJ4R
CompTox Dashboard (EPA)	DTXSID7065463
- InChI: InChI=1S/FH.Rb/h1H;/q;+1/p-1 Key: AHLATJUETSFVIM-UHFFFAOYSA-M; InChI=1/FH.Rb/h1H;/q;+1/p-1 Key: AHLATJUETSFVIM-REWHXWOFAO
- SMILES: [Rb+].[F-]

Properties
Chemical formula	RbF
Molar mass	104.4662 g/mol
Appearance	white crystalline solid
Density	3.557 g/cm^{3}
Melting point	795 °C (1,463 °F; 1,068 K)
Boiling point	1,408 °C (2,566 °F; 1,681 K)
Solubility in water	130.6 g/100 mL (18 °C)
Solubility in acetone	0.0036 g/kg (18 °C); 0.0039 g/kg (37 °C)
Magnetic susceptibility (χ)	−31.9·10^{−6} cm^{3}/mol
Refractive index (n_{D})	1.398

Structure
Space group	Fm3m (No. 225)
Lattice constant	a = 565 pm
Formula units (Z)	4

Thermochemistry
Std molar entropy (S^{⦵}_{298})	113.9 J·mol^{−1}·K^{−1}
Std enthalpy of formation (Δ_{f}H^{⦵}_{298})	−552.2 kJ/mol
Gibbs free energy (Δ_{f}G^{⦵})	−520.4 kJ/mol

Hazards
- Occupational safety and health (OHS/OSH)
Main hazards	Toxic
- GHS labelling
Pictograms	(GHS06: Toxic) (GHS07: Exclamation mark) (GHS08: Health hazard)
Signal word	Danger
Hazard statements	H301, H302, H311, H312, H315, H319, H331, H332, H335, H351
Precautionary statements	P203, P261, P262, P264, P264+P265, P270, P271, P280, P301+P316, P301+P317, P302+P352, P304+P340, P305+P351+P338, P316, P317, P318, P319, P321, P330, P332+P317, P337+P317, P361+P364, P362+P364, P403+P233, P405, P501
NFPA 704 (fire diamond)	3 0 0
Flash point	Non-flammable
Threshold limit value (TLV)	2.5 mg/m^{3}, as F
- NIOSH (US health exposure limits)
PEL (Permissible)	2.5 mg/m^{3}, as F

Related compounds
Other anions	Rubidium chloride Rubidium bromide Rubidium iodide Rubidium astatide
Other cations	Lithium fluoride Sodium fluoride Potassium fluoride Caesium fluoride Francium fluoride
- Except where otherwise noted, data are given for materials in their standard state (at 25 °C [77 °F], 100 kPa). verify (what is ?) Infobox references

Rubidium fluoride (RbF) is the fluoride salt of rubidium. It is a white crystalline solid with a cubic crystal structure, similar to common salt. It forms two different hydrates, a sesquihydrate with the stoichiometric composition 2RbF·3H_{2}O and a third hydrate with the composition 3RbF·H_{2}O.

== Synthesis ==
There are several methods for synthesising rubidium fluoride. One involves reacting rubidium hydroxide with hydrofluoric acid:

RbOH + HF → RbF + H_{2}O

Another method is to neutralize rubidium carbonate with hydrofluoric acid:

Rb_{2}CO_{3} + 2HF → 2RbF + H_{2}O + CO_{2}

Another possible method is to react rubidium hydroxide with ammonium fluoride:

RbOH + NH_{4}F → RbF + H_{2}O + NH_{3}

The least used method due to expense of rubidium metal is to react it directly with fluorine gas, as rubidium reacts violently with halogens:

2Rb + F_{2} → 2RbF

== Properties ==
The enthalpy of solution of rubidium fluoride was determined to be −24.28 kJ/mol.

Rubidium fluoride has a purple or magenta red flame test.

== Related compounds ==
In addition to simple rubidium fluoride, an acidic rubidium fluoride with the molecular formula HRbF_{2} is also known, which can be produced by reacting rubidium fluoride and hydrogen fluoride. The compounds H_{2}RbF_{3} and H_{3}RbF_{4} were also synthesized.
