= Hydrobromic acid =

Aqueous solution of hydrogen bromide

Ball-and-stick model of hydrogen bromide
Ball-and-stick model of water
Ball-and-stick model of the bromide anion
Ball-and-stick model of the hydronium cation
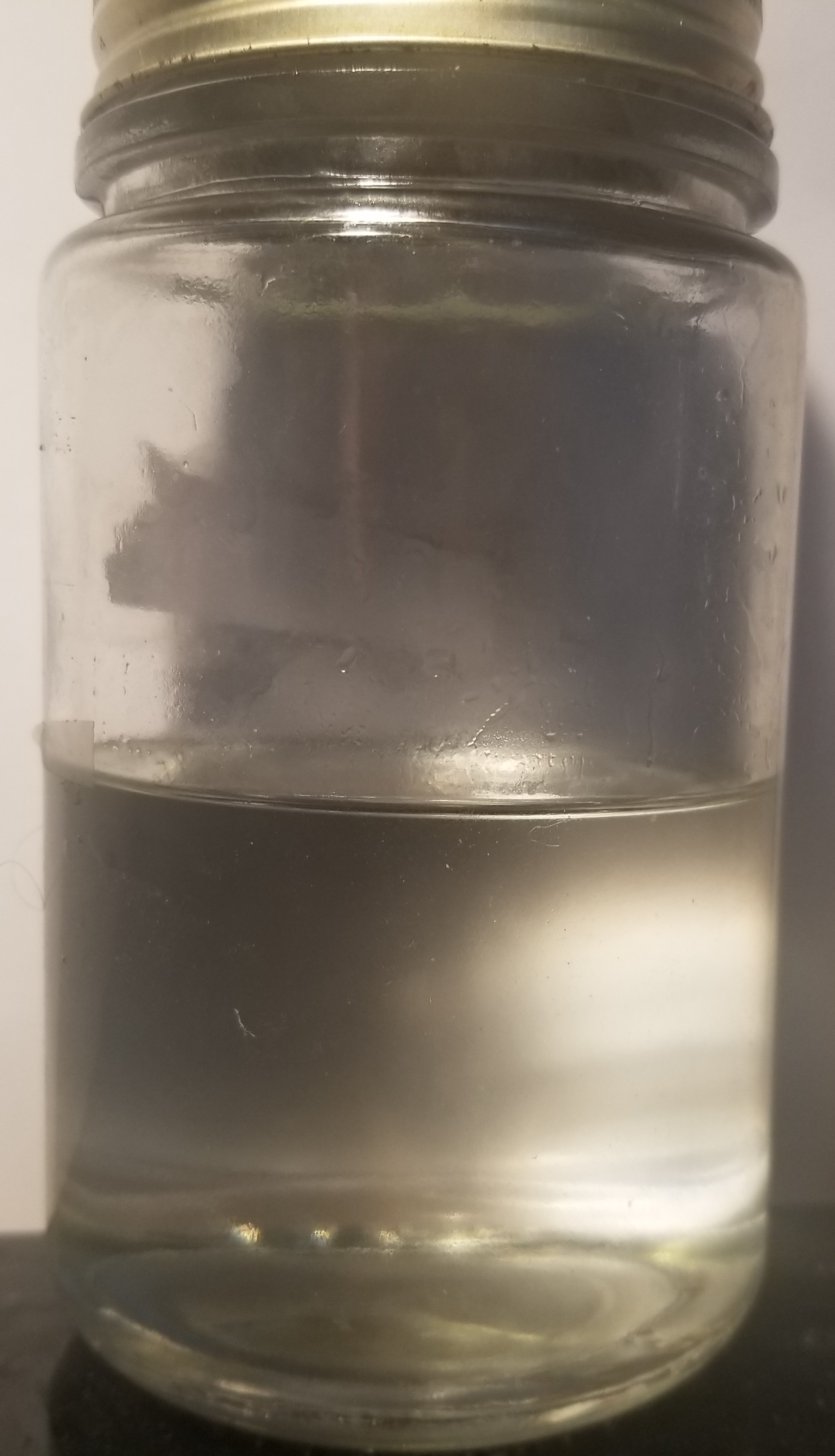

Names
- IUPAC name Bromane
- Other names Hydronium bromide Bromhydric acid

Identifiers
CAS Number	10035-10-6
3D model (JSmol)	Interactive image
ChEBI	CHEBI:47266
ChEMBL	ChEMBL1231461
ChemSpider	255
ECHA InfoCard	100.240.772
EC Number	233-113-0
Gmelin Reference	620
KEGG	C13645
PubChem CID	260
RTECS number	MW3850000
UNII	3IY7CNP8XJ
UN number	1048 1788
- InChI: InChI=1S/BrH/h1H Key: CPELXLSAUQHCOX-UHFFFAOYSA-N; InChI=1/BrH/h1H Key: CPELXLSAUQHCOX-UHFFFAOYAZ
- SMILES: [OH3+].[Br-]

Properties
Chemical formula	HBr_{(aq)}
Molar mass	80.91 g·mol^{−1}
Appearance	colorless liquid (impure samples can appear yellowish)
Odor	acrid
Density	1.49 g/cm^{3} (48% w/w aq.)
Melting point	−11 °C (12 °F; 262 K) (47–49% w/w aq.)
Boiling point	122 °C (252 °F; 395 K) at 700 mmHg (47–49% w/w aq.)
Solubility in water	221 g/100 mL (0 °C); 204 g/100 mL (15 °C); 130 g/100 mL (100 °C)
Acidity (pK_{a})	−9
Viscosity	0.84 cP (−75 °C)

Thermochemistry
Heat capacity (C)	29.1 J/(K·mol)
Std molar entropy (S^{⦵}_{298})	198.7 J/(K·mol)
Std enthalpy of formation (Δ_{f}H^{⦵}_{298})	−36.3 kJ/mol

Hazards
- GHS labelling
Pictograms	(GHS05: Corrosive) (GHS07: Exclamation mark)
Signal word	Danger
Hazard statements	H314, H335
Precautionary statements	P260, P264, P271, P280, P301+P330+P331, P303+P361+P353, P304+P340, P305+P351+P338, P310, P312, P321, P363, P403+P233, P405, P501
NFPA 704 (fire diamond)	3 0 0 ACID
Flash point	Nonflammable
Safety data sheet (SDS)	ICSC 0282

Related compounds
Other anions	Hydrofluoric acid Hydrochloric acid Hydroiodic acid
Related compounds	Hydrogen bromide
- Except where otherwise noted, data are given for materials in their standard state (at 25 °C [77 °F], 100 kPa). verify (what is ?) Infobox references

Hydrobromic acid is an aqueous solution of hydrogen bromide. It is a strong acid formed by dissolving the diatomic molecule hydrogen bromide (HBr) in water. "Constant boiling" hydrobromic acid is an aqueous solution that distills at 124.3 °C (255.7 °F) and contains 47.6% HBr by mass, which is 8.77 mol/L. Hydrobromic acid is one of the strongest mineral acids known.

== Uses and reactions ==
Hydrobromic acid is mainly used for the production of inorganic bromides such as the hydrated bromides of iron, nickel, and zinc.

Hydrobromic acid is a useful reagent for generating organobromine compounds. It converts primary alcohols to alkyl bromides. Certain ethers are cleaved with HBr. HBr participates in anti-Markovnikov hydrohalogenation of alkenes in the presence of peroxides. The resulting 1-bromoalkanes are versatile alkylating agents, giving rise to fatty amines and quaternary ammonium salts.

In the presence of hydrogen peroxide, it gives bromine. Since elemental bromine can be dangerous to handle, the H_{2}O_{2}/HBr mixture is used instead, e.g. for aromatic brominations:

2 ArH + 2 HBr + H_{2}O_{2} → 2 ArBr + 2 H_{2}O (Ar = aryl)

Industrially significant organic compounds prepared from hydrobromic acid include allyl bromide, the fire-retardant tetrabromobisphenol A, and bromoacetic acid.

== Synthesis ==
Hydrobromic acid can be prepared in the laboratory via the reaction of Br_{2}, SO_{2}, and water.

Br_{2} + SO_{2} + 2 H_{2}O → H_{2}SO_{4} + 2 HBr

More typically laboratory preparations involve the production of anhydrous HBr, which is then dissolved in water.

Hydrobromic acid has commonly been prepared industrially by reacting bromine with either sulfur or phosphorus and water. However, it can also be produced electrolytically. It can also be prepared by treating bromides with non-oxidising acids like phosphoric or acetic acids.

Alternatively the acid can be prepared with dilute (5.8M) sulfuric acid and potassium bromide:

H_{2}SO_{4} + KBr → KHSO_{4} + HBr

Using more concentrated sulfuric acid or allowing the reaction solution to exceed 75 °C further oxidizes HBr to elemental bromine. The acid is further purified by filtering out the KHSO_{4} and by distilling off the water until the solution reaches an azeotrope (124.3 °C). The yield is approximately 85%.

Hydrobromic acid is available commercially in various concentrations and purities.
