= Caesium bromide =

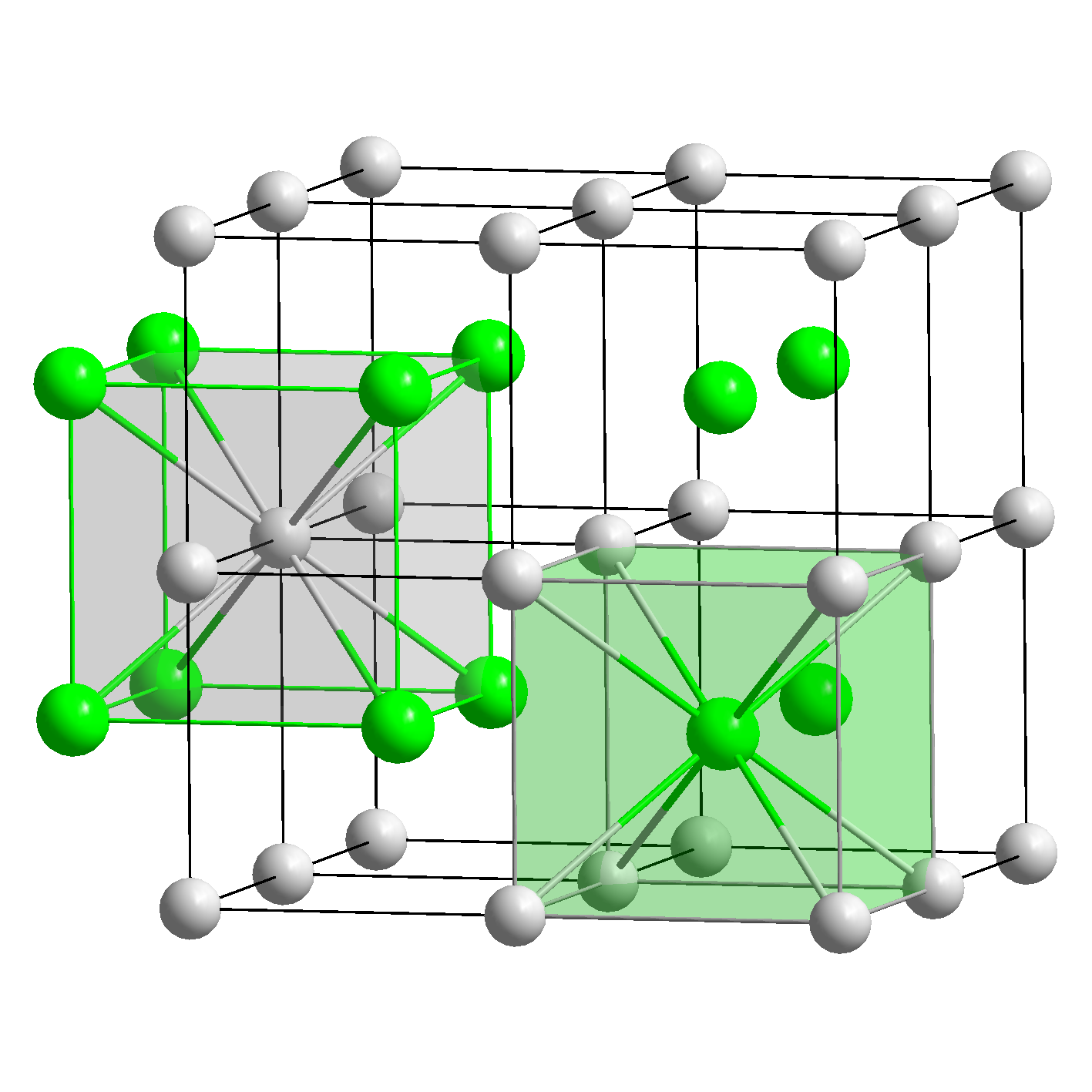

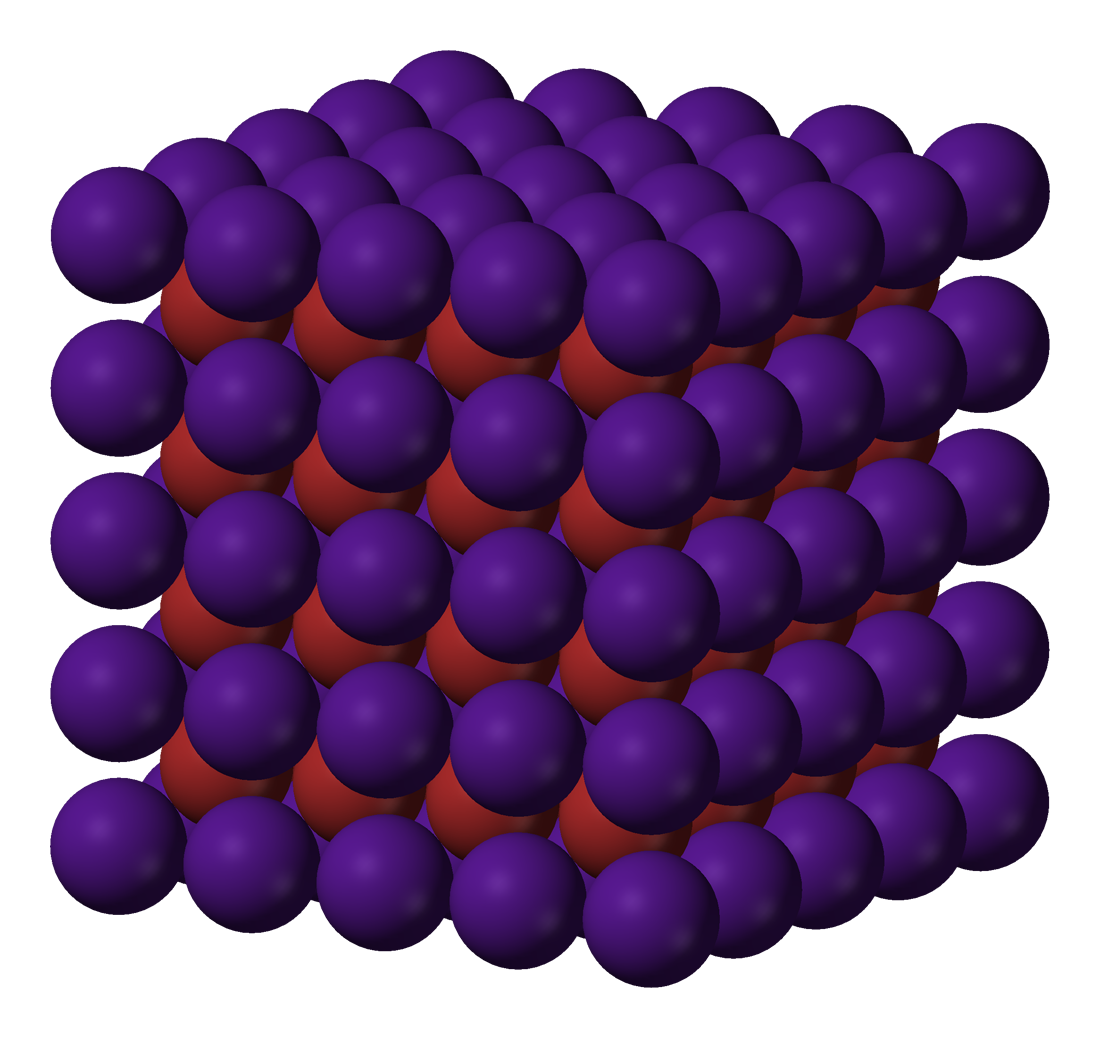

Names
- IUPAC name Cesium bromide
- Other names Cesium bromide, Caesium(I) bromide

Identifiers
CAS Number	7787-69-1
3D model (JSmol)	Interactive image
ChemSpider	22994
ECHA InfoCard	100.029.209
EC Number	232-130-0
PubChem CID	24592
RTECS number	FK9275000
UNII	06M25EDM3F
CompTox Dashboard (EPA)	DTXSID8064854
- InChI: InChI=1S/BrH.Cs/h1H;/q;+1/p-1 Key: LYQFWZFBNBDLEO-UHFFFAOYSA-M; InChI=1/BrH.Cs/h1H;/q;+1/p-1 Key: LYQFWZFBNBDLEO-REWHXWOFAA
- SMILES: [Cs+].[Br-]

Properties
Chemical formula	CsBr
Molar mass	212.809 g/mol
Appearance	White solid
Density	4.43 g/cm^{3}
Melting point	636 °C (1,177 °F; 909 K)
Boiling point	1,300 °C (2,370 °F; 1,570 K)
Solubility in water	1230 g/L (25 °C) Disputed. 420 g/L (11 °C) See References; 560 /L (15°C); 1020 g/L (28.5 °C); 1180 g/L (31 °C); 1240 g/L (32.5 °C); 1380 g/L (35 °C)
Magnetic susceptibility (χ)	−67.2·10^{−6} cm^{3}/mol
Refractive index (n_{D})	1.8047 (0.3 μm); 1.6974 (0.59 μm); 1.6861 (0.75 μm); 1.6784 (1 μm); 1.6678 (5 μm); 1.6439 (20 μm)

Structure
Crystal structure	CsCl, cP2
Space group	Pm3̅m, No. 221
Lattice constant	a = 0.4291 nm
Lattice volume (V)	0.0790 nm^{3}
Formula units (Z)	1
Coordination geometry	Cubic (Cs^{+}); Cubic (Br^{−})

Hazards
- GHS labelling
Pictograms	(GHS07: Exclamation mark)
Signal word	Warning
Hazard statements	H302, H315, H319, H335
Precautionary statements	P261, P264, P270, P271, P280, P301+P312, P302+P352, P304+P340, P305+P351+P338, P312, P321, P330, P332+P313, P337+P313, P362, P403+P233, P405, P501
NFPA 704 (fire diamond)	2 0 0
Flash point	Non-flammable
- Lethal dose or concentration (LD, LC)
LD_{50} (median dose)	1400 mg/kg (oral, rat)

Related compounds
Other anions	Caesium fluoride Caesium chloride Caesium iodide Caesium astatide
Other cations	Sodium bromide Potassium bromide Rubidium bromide Francium bromide
- Except where otherwise noted, data are given for materials in their standard state (at 25 °C [77 °F], 100 kPa). verify (what is ?) Infobox references

Caesium bromide or cesium bromide is an ionic compound of caesium and bromine with the chemical formula CsBr. It is a white or transparent solid with melting point at 636 °C that readily dissolves in water. Its bulk crystals have the cubic CsCl structure, but the structure changes to the rocksalt type in nanometer-thin film grown on mica, LiF, KBr or NaCl substrates.

== Synthesis ==
Caesium bromide can be prepared via neutralization reactions:

CsOH + HBr → CsBr + H_{2}O
Cs_{2}(CO_{3}) + 2 HBr → 2 CsBr + H_{2}O + CO_{2}

It can also be prepared by direct synthesis:

2 Cs + Br_{2} → 2 CsBr

The direct synthesis is a vigorous reaction of caesium with bromine. Due to its high cost, it is not used for preparation.

== Uses ==
Caesium bromide is sometimes used in optics as a beamsplitter component in wide-band spectrophotometers.

== Cited sources ==
- Haynes, William M., ed. (2011). CRC Handbook of Chemistry and Physics (92nd ed.). Boca Raton, Florida: CRC Press. ISBN 1-4398-5511-0.
- Crystran Ltd experimental data July 2021
