= Potassium bromide =

Ionic compound (KBr)

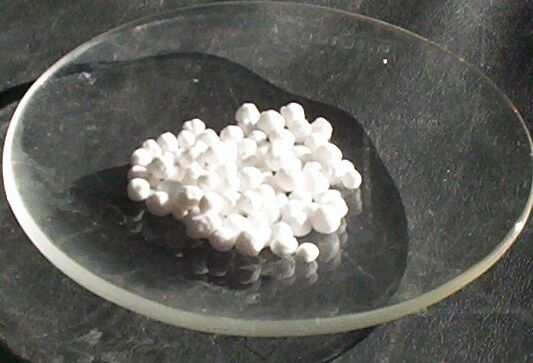
- Potassium bromide

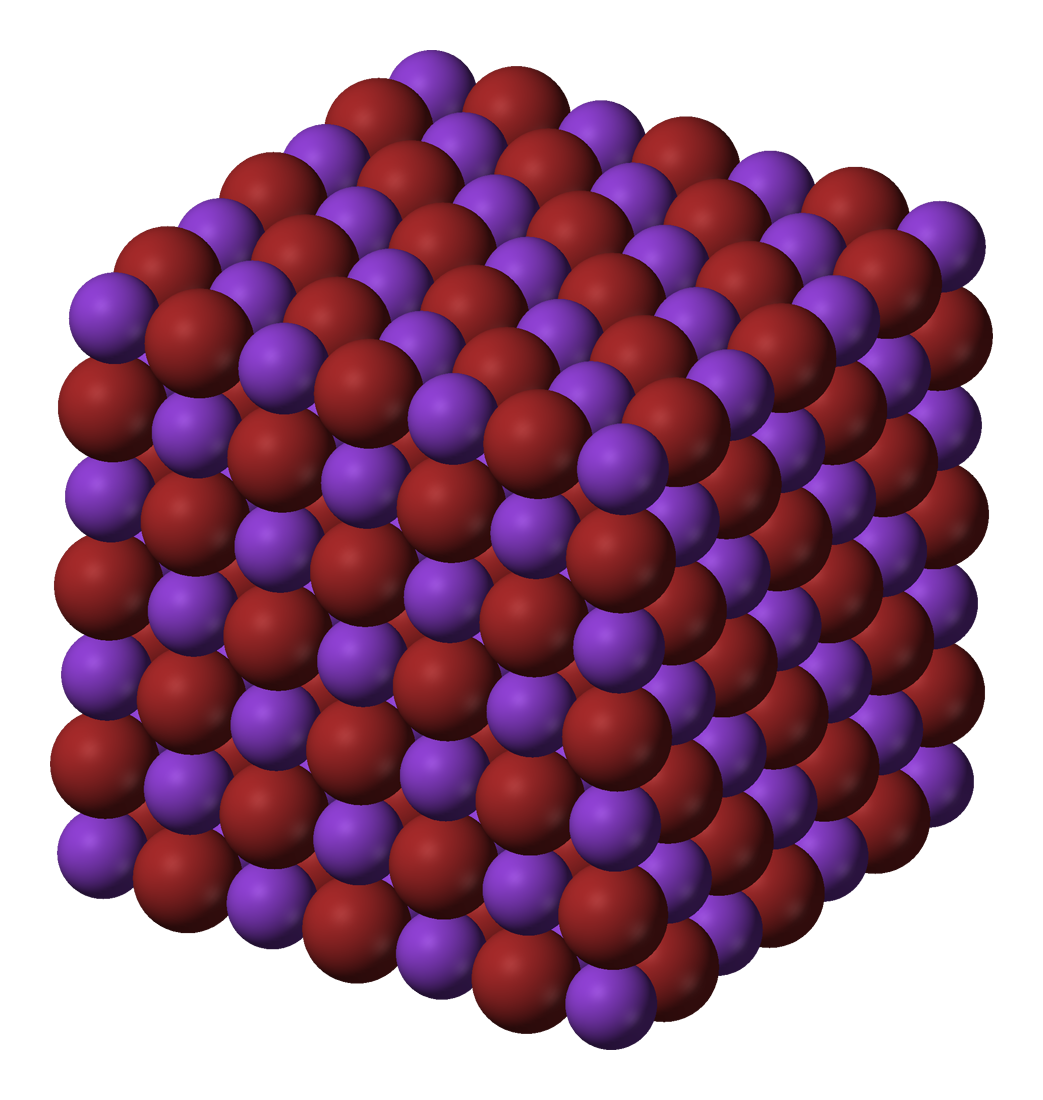
- Potassium bromide

Identifiers
CAS Number	7758-02-3
3D model (JSmol)	Interactive image
ChEBI	CHEBI:32030
ChEMBL	ChEMBL1644030
ChemSpider	22854
ECHA InfoCard	100.028.937
PubChem CID	253877
RTECS number	TS7650000
UNII	OSD78555ZM
CompTox Dashboard (EPA)	DTXSID5025946
- InChI: InChI=1S/BrH.K/h1H;/q;+1/p-1 Key: IOLCXVTUBQKXJR-UHFFFAOYSA-M; InChI=1/BrH.K/h1H;/q;+1/p-1 Key: IOLCXVTUBQKXJR-REWHXWOFAT
- SMILES: [K+].[Br-]

Properties
Chemical formula	KBr
Molar mass	119.002 g·mol^{-1}
Appearance	white solid
Odor	odorless
Density	2.74 g/cm^{3}
Melting point	734 °C (1,353 °F; 1,007 K)
Boiling point	1,435 °C (2,615 °F; 1,708 K)
Solubility in water	535 g/L (0 °C); 678 g/L (25 °C); 1020 g/L (100 °C)
Solubility	very slightly soluble in diethyl ether
Solubility in glycerol	217 g/L
Solubility in ethanol	47.6 g/L (80 °C)
Magnetic susceptibility (χ)	−49.1×10^{−6} cm^{3}/mol
Refractive index (n_{D})	1.559

Structure
Crystal structure	Sodium chloride(Face-centered cubic)
Coordination geometry	octahedral
Dipole moment	10.41 D (gas)

Pharmacology
ATCvet code	QN03AX91 (WHO)

Hazards
- GHS labelling
Pictograms	(GHS07: Exclamation mark)
Signal word	Warning
Hazard statements	H319
Precautionary statements	P261, P264, P264+P265, P271, P280, P302+P352, P304+P340, P305+P351+P338, P319, P321, P332+P317, P337+P317, P362+P364, P403+P233, P405, P501
NFPA 704 (fire diamond)	1 0 0
- Lethal dose or concentration (LD, LC)
LD_{50} (median dose)	3070 mg/kg (oral, rat)

Related compounds
Other anions	Potassium fluoride Potassium chloride Potassium iodide
Other cations	Lithium bromide Sodium bromide Rubidium bromide Caesium bromide Francium bromide
- Except where otherwise noted, data are given for materials in their standard state (at 25 °C [77 °F], 100 kPa). verify (what is ?) Infobox references

Potassium bromide (KBr) is a salt, widely used as an anticonvulsant and a sedative in the late 19th and early 20th centuries, with over-the-counter use extending to 1975 in the US. Its action is due to the bromide ion (sodium bromide is equally effective). Potassium bromide is used as a veterinary drug, in antiepileptic medication for dogs. Under standard conditions, potassium bromide is a white crystalline powder. It is freely soluble in water; it is not soluble in acetonitrile. In a dilute aqueous solution, potassium bromide tastes sweet, at higher concentrations it tastes bitter, and tastes salty when the concentration is even higher. These effects are mainly due to the properties of the potassium ion—sodium bromide tastes salty at any concentration. In high concentration, potassium bromide strongly irritates the gastric mucous membrane, causing nausea and sometimes vomiting (a typical effect of all soluble potassium salts).

== Chemical properties ==
Potassium bromide, a typical ionic salt, is fully dissociated and near pH 7 in aqueous solution. It serves as a source of bromide ions. This reaction is important for the manufacture of silver bromide for photographic film:

KBr_{(aq)} + AgNO_{3}_{(aq)} → AgBr_{(s)} + KNO_{3}_{(aq)}

Aqueous bromide Br^{−} also forms complexes when reacted with some metal halides such as copper(II) bromide:

2 KBr_{(aq)} + CuBr_{2}_{(aq)} → K_{2}[CuBr_{4}]_{(aq)}

== Preparation ==
A traditional method for the manufacture of KBr is the reaction of potassium carbonate with an iron(III, II) bromide, Fe_{3}Br_{8}, made by treating scrap iron under water with excess bromine:

4 K_{2}CO_{3} + Fe_{3}Br_{8} → 8 KBr + Fe_{3}O_{4} + 4 CO_{2}

== Applications ==
=== Medical and veterinary ===
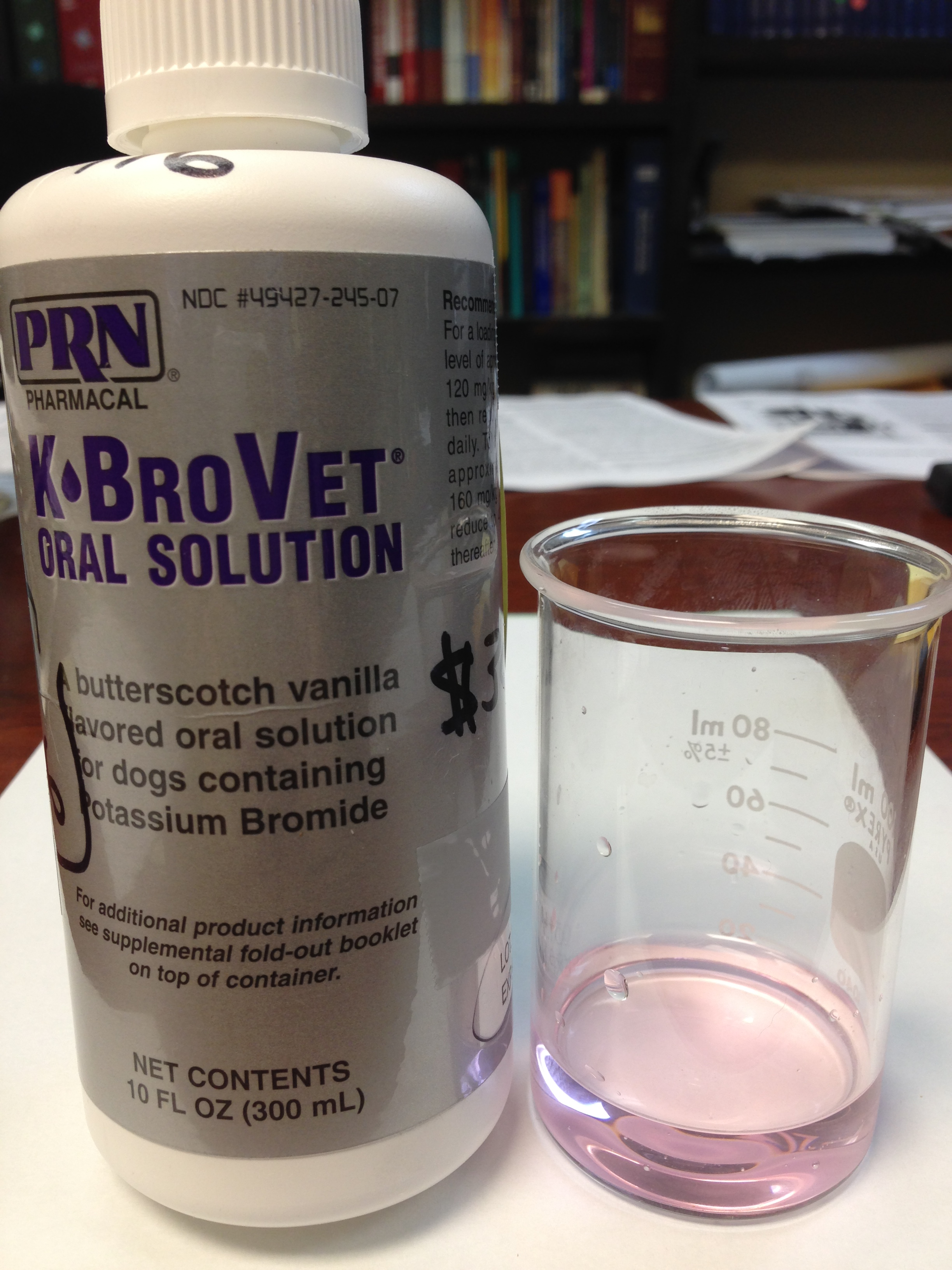
A bottle of PRN Pharmaceutical Company (Pensacola, FL) K•BroVet veterinary pharmaceutical potassium bromide oral solution (250 mg/mL). The product is intended to be used in dogs, primarily as an antiepileptic (to stop seizures). The pink color of the solution is artificial; pure potassium bromide solutions are colorless

The anticonvulsant properties of potassium bromide were first noted by Sir Charles Locock at a meeting of the Royal Medical and Chirurgical Society in 1857. Bromide can be regarded as the first effective medication for epilepsy. At the time, it was commonly thought that epilepsy was caused by masturbation. Locock noted that bromide calmed sexual excitement and thought this was responsible for his success in treating seizures. In the latter half of the 19th century, potassium bromide was used for the calming of seizure and nervous disorders on an enormous scale, with the use by single hospitals being as much as several tons a year (the dose for a given person being a few grams per day). By the beginning of the 20th century, the generic word had become so widely associated with being sedate that the term 'bromide' came to mean a dull, sedate person or a boring platitude uttered by such a person.

There was not a better epilepsy drug until phenobarbital in 1912. The British Army has historically been claimed to lace soldiers' tea with bromide to quell sexual arousal and in the Victorian era prisoners in England were compulsorily dosed with the chemical.

Bromide compounds, especially sodium bromide, remained in over-the-counter sedatives and headache remedies (such as the original formulation of Bromo-Seltzer) in the US until 1975, when bromides were outlawed in all over-the-counter medicines, due to chronic toxicity. Bromide's exceedingly long biological half-life made it difficult to dose without side effects. Medical use of bromides for humans in the US was discontinued at this time, as many better and shorter-acting sedatives were known by then.

Potassium bromide is still used in veterinary medicine to treat epilepsy in dogs, either as first-line treatment or in addition to phenobarbital, when seizures are not adequately controlled with phenobarbital alone. Use of bromide in cats is limited because it carries a substantial risk of causing lung inflammation (pneumonitis) in them. Why bromides should cause such inflammation in cats, but not in dogs, is not clear.

The use of bromide as a treatment drug for animals means that veterinary medical diagnostic laboratories are able as a matter of routine to measure serum levels of bromide on order of a veterinarian, whereas human medical diagnostic labs in the US do not measure bromide as a routine test.

Potassium bromide is not approved by the US Food and Drug Administration (FDA) for use in humans to control seizures. In Germany, it is still approved as an antiepileptic drug for humans, particularly children and adolescents. These indications include severe forms of generalized tonic-clonic seizures, early-childhood-related tonic–clonic seizures, and also severe myoclonic seizures during childhood. Adults who have reacted positively to the drug during childhood/adolescence may continue treatment. Potassium bromide tablets are sold under the brand name Dibro-Be mono (Rx-only). The drug has almost complete bioavailability, but the bromide ion has a relatively long biological half-life of 12 days in the blood, making bromide salts difficult to adjust and dose. Bromide is not known to interfere with the absorption or excretion of any other anticonvulsant, though it does have strong interactions with chloride in the body, the normal body uptake and excretion of which strongly influences bromide's excretion.

The therapeutic index (ratio of effectiveness to toxicity) for bromide is small. As with other antiepileptics, sometimes even therapeutic doses (3 to 5 grams per day, taking 6 to 8 weeks to reach stable levels) may give rise to intoxication. Often indistinguishable from 'expected' side-effects, these include:

- Bromism These are central nervous system reactions. They may include:
  - depression,
  - lethargy, somnolence (from daytime sleepiness to coma)
  - loss of appetite and cachexia, nausea/emesis with exicosis (loss of body fluid)
  - loss of reflexes or pathologic reflexes
  - clonic seizures
  - tremor
  - ataxia
  - loss of neural sensitivity
  - paresis
  - cerebral edema with associated headache and papilledema of the eyes
  - delirium: confusion, abnormal speech, loss of concentration and memory, aggressiveness
  - psychosis
- Acne-form dermatitis and other forms of skin disease may also be seen, as well as mucous hypersecretion in the lungs. Asthma and rhinitis may worsen. Rarely, tongue disorder, aphthous stomatitis, bad breath, and constipation occur.

=== Optics ===
Potassium bromide is transparent from the near ultraviolet to long-wave infrared wavelengths (0.25-25 μm) and has no significant optical absorption lines in its high transmission region. It is used widely as infrared optical windows and components for general spectroscopy because of its wide spectral range. In infrared spectroscopy, samples are analyzed by grinding with powdered potassium bromide and pressing into a disc. Alternatively, samples may be analyzed as a liquid film (neat, as a solution, or in a mull with Nujol) between two polished potassium bromide discs.

Due to its high solubility and hygroscopic nature it must be kept in a dry environment. The refractive index is about 1.55 at 1.0 μm.

=== Photography ===
In addition to manufacture of silver bromide, potassium bromide is used as a restrainer in black and white developer formulas. It improves differentiation between exposed and unexposed crystals of silver halide, and thus reduces fog.
