= Rubidium-82 chloride =

Names
- IUPAC name Rubidium-82 chloride
- Systematic IUPAC name (^{82}Rb)Rubidium chloride

Identifiers
CAS Number	132486-03-4
3D model (JSmol)	Interactive image
ChemSpider	64457
KEGG	D05773
PubChem CID	71357
UNII	F0Z746KRKQ
CompTox Dashboard (EPA)	DTXSID60894902
- InChI: InChI=1S/ClH.Rb/h1H;/q;+1/p-1/i;1-3 Key: FGDZQCVHDSGLHJ-RYDPDVNUSA-M
- SMILES: [Cl-].[82Rb+]

Properties
Chemical formula	ClRb
Molar mass	117.371 g mol^{−1}

Pharmacology
ATC code	V09GX04 (WHO)

Related compounds
Other cations	Lithium chloride; Sodium chloride; Potassium chloride; Rubidium chloride; Caesium chloride
- Except where otherwise noted, data are given for materials in their standard state (at 25 °C [77 °F], 100 kPa). Infobox references

Rubidium-82 chloride is a form of rubidium chloride containing a radioactive isotope of rubidium. It is marketed under the brand name Cardiogen-82 by Bracco Diagnostics for use in Myocardial perfusion imaging. It is rapidly taken up by heart muscle cells, and therefore can be used to identify regions of heart muscle that are receiving poor blood flow in a technique called PET perfusion imaging. The half-life of rubidium-82 is only 1.26 minutes; it is normally produced at the place of use by rubidium generators.
