= Early Cambrian geochemical fluctuations =

The start of the Cambrian period is marked by "fluctuations" in a number of geochemical records, including Strontium, Sulfur and Carbon isotopic excursions. While these anomalies are difficult to interpret, a number of possibilities have been put forward. They probably represent changes on a global scale, and as such may help to constrain possible causes of the Cambrian explosion.

The chemical signature may be related to continental break-up, the end of a "global glaciation", or a catastrophic drop in productivity caused by a mass extinction just before the beginning of the Cambrian.

== Isotopes ==
Isotopes are different forms of elements; they have a different number of neutrons in the nucleus, meaning they have very similar chemical properties, but different mass. The weight difference means that some isotopes are discriminated against in chemical processes – for example, plants find it easier to incorporate the lighter ^{12}C than heavy ^{13}C. Other isotopes are only produced as a result of the radioactive decay of other elements, such as ^{87}Sr, the daughter isotope of ^{87}Rb. Rb, and therefore ^{87}Sr, is common in the crust, so abundance of ^{87}Sr in a sample of sediment (relative to ^{86}Sr) is related to the amount of sediment which originated in the crust, as opposed to from the oceans.

The ratios of three major isotopes, ^{87}Sr / ^{86}Sr, ^{34}S / ^{32}S and ^{13}C / ^{12}C, undergo dramatic fluctuations around the beginning of the Cambrian.

=== Carbon isotopes ===
Carbon has 2 stable isotopes, carbon-12 (^{12}C) and carbon-13 (^{13}C). The ratio between the two is denoted δ^{13}C, and represents a number of factors.

Because organic matter preferentially takes up the lighter ^{12}C, an increase in productivity increases the δ^{13}C of the rest of the system, and vice versa. Some carbon reservoirs are very isotopically light: for instance, biogenic methane, produced by bacterial decomposition, has a δ^{13}C of −60‰ – vast, when 1‰ is a large fluctuation! An injection of carbon from one of these reservoirs could therefore account for the early Cambrian drop in δ^{13}C.

Causes often suggested for changes in the ratio of ^{13}C to ^{12}C found in rocks include:

- A mass extinction. Chemistry is largely driven by electro-magnetic forces, and lighter isotopes such as ^{12}C respond to these more quickly than heavier ones such as ^{13}C. So living organisms generally contain a disproportionate amount of ^{12}C. A mass extinction would increase the amount of ^{12}C available to be included in rocks and therefore reduce the ratio of ^{13}C to ^{12}C.
- A methane “burp”. In permafrosts and continental shelves methane produced by bacteria gets trapped in “cages” of water molecules, forming a mixture called a clathrate. This methane is very rich in ^{12}C because it has been produced by organisms. Clathrates may dissociate (break up) suddenly if the temperature rises or the pressure on them drops. Such dissociations release the ^{12}C-rich methane and thus reduce the ratio of ^{13}C to ^{12}C as this carbon is gradually incorporated into rocks (methane in the atmosphere breaks down into carbon dioxide and water; carbon dioxide reacts with minerals to form carbonate rocks).
