= Partho P. Sengupta =

Indian-American cardiologist

- Medical career
- Profession: Academic/Doctor Scientist and Administrator
- Field: Cardiology
- Institutions: Robert Wood Johnson Medical School Robert Wood Johnson University Hospital
- Research: Cardiology, Cardiac imaging

Partho P. Sengupta is an Indian-American cardiologist. He is the Henry Rutgers Professor of Cardiology and Chief of the Division of Cardiovascular Disease & Hypertension at the Robert Wood Johnson Medical School (RWJMS) and the Chief of the Cardiac Service Line at the Robert Wood Johnson University Hospital (RWJUH) since July 1, 2021.

== Education and work ==
Sengupta received his medical degree from Government Medical College in India. Later, He finished the cardiology fellowship from All India Institute of Medical Sciences and from both Mayo Clinic in Arizona and Minnesota. From 2004 to 2010, Sengupta was the Assistant Professor of Mayo Clinic College of Medicine and Science and in 2011 he became the Director of Noninvasive Cardiology and Cardiac Imaging at University of California, Irvine. Between 2011 and 2017, he was the Director of Interventional Echocardiography, Director of Cardiac Ultrasound Research and Core Lab at Mount Sinai School of Medicine. From 2017 to 2021, he assumed the role of Chief of Division of Cardiology, Professor of Medicine and The Abnash C. Jain Chair of Cardiology at West Virginia University Heart and Vascular Institute. Currently, he is appointed as the Henry Rutgers Professor of Cardiology and Chief of the Division of Cardiovascular Disease & Hypertension at the Robert Wood Johnson Medical School and Chief of Cardiology at the Robert Wood Johnson University Hospital.

== Awards and honors ==
Sengupta has received numerous national and international honors recognizing his contributions to cardiovascular research, education, and innovation. In 2026, he was named a Distinguished Scientist in the Translational Domain by the American College of Cardiology. His recent recognitions include the Rutgers Innovation Award in Artificial Intelligence and Digital Innovation in 2025, designation as a Top 1% Healthcare Research All-Star by Avant-Garde Health in 2025, the Award for Outstanding Achievements in the Field of Cardiology from the American Association of Cardiologists of Indian Origin in 2024, the NJBiz Healthcare Hero Award in 2023, and the Gifted Educator Award from the American College of Cardiology in 2023.

Earlier in his career, he has won excellence awards including American Society of Echocardiography Young Investigator Award in 2004, Mayo Clinic Research Award in 2007, Mayo Brother's Distinguished Fellowship Award in 2009 and AACIO Young Investigator Award in 2010. He was awarded American Society of Echocardiography 14th Feigenbaum Lectureship for recognizing his contributions to research in the field of echocardiography. In 2020, Sengupta was named a Richard Popp Excellence in Teaching Award recipient by the American Society of Echocardiography. He has been recognized by international societies including the American Society of Echocardiography, American Medical Association, European Society of Cardiology and British Society of Echocardiography for his roles in education and innovation. A group of researchers led by Sengupta won the National Heart, Lung, and Blood Institute big data analysis challenge for creating innovative paradigms in heart failure research.
