= Cardiac imaging =

- ICD-10-PCS: B2
- MeSH: D057791

Cardiac imaging refers to minimally invasive imaging of the heart using ultrasound, magnetic resonance imaging (MRI), computed tomography (CT), or nuclear medicine (NM) imaging with PET or SPECT. These cardiac techniques are otherwise referred to as echocardiography, cardiac MRI, cardiac CT, cardiac PET, and cardiac SPECT including myocardial perfusion imaging.

== Indications ==
A physician may recommend cardiac imaging to support a diagnosis of a heart condition.

Medical specialty professional organizations discourage the use of routine cardiac imaging during pre-operative assessment for patients about to undergo low or mid-risk non-cardiac surgery because the procedure carries risks and is unlikely to result in the change of a patient's management. Stress cardiac imaging is discouraged in the evaluation of patients without cardiac symptoms or in routine follow-ups.

== Echocardiography ==
Echocardiography is regularly utilized to diagnose, manage, and monitor patients with suspected or established heart ailments, making it a highly prevalent diagnostic imaging technique in cardiology due to its speed and efficiency.

=== Transthoracic echocardiography (TTE) ===
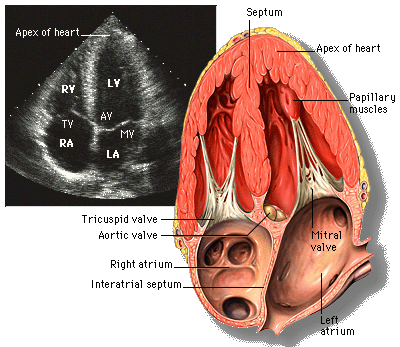
Apical four chamber ultrasound view of heart

Transthoracic echocardiography (TTE) uses ultrasonic waves for continuous heart chamber and blood movement visualization. It is the most commonly used imaging tool for diagnosing heart problems, as it allows non-invasive visualization of the heart and the blood flow through the heart, using a technique known as Doppler.

TTE is commonly used to evaluate patients with coronary artery disease. Stress echocardiography is used to diagnose coronary artery disease and assess myocardial viability.

=== Transesophageal echocardiography (TEE) ===
Transesophageal echocardiography is an invasive procedure that involves inserting a flexible probe with an ultrasound transducer into the esophagus, providing closer access to the heart and surrounding structures. This procedure allows for better imaging of the aorta, pulmonary artery, heart valves, atria, atrial septum, left atrial appendage, and coronary arteries. It can also be used during cardiac surgery to monitor the patient and assess the success of surgical interventions. TTE can visualize non-dilated coronary arteries and measure coronary artery flow using harmonic imaging, contrast agents, and high-frequency transducers. This noninvasive and low-cost method can help diagnose and manage patients with suspected or confirmed CAD by demonstrating pathologic coronary artery flow patterns at rest and with pharmacological stress.

Transesophageal echocardiography creates clearer images of the heart and surrounding blood vessels than traditional transthoracic echocardiography (TTE). TEE is especially useful for patients with obesity or chronic obstructive pulmonary disease (COPD) who may have difficulty obtaining high-quality images using TTE.

However, TEE has several disadvantages, including the need for a team of medical personnel to perform the procedure, the necessity of the patient to follow specific guidelines before the procedure, longer procedure time, and potential discomfort for the patient requiring general anesthesia. TEE is also limited by available anatomy and may require a second procedure, such as esophagogastroduodenoscopy, to visualize the anatomy for safety.

Additionally, TEE has some risks associated with it, such as esophageal perforation and adverse reactions to medication.

==== 3D transesophageal echocardiography ====
3D transesophageal echocardiography (TEE) is a technology developed to improve upon the limitations of 2D tomography. With the introduction of the matrix TEE probe, 3D TEE can collect real-time 3D images that provide a comprehensive view of the heart structures, leading to better understanding and decision making during cardiac procedures. The technique acquires a volumetric data set and displays it in custom orientations, allowing for greater depth and understanding of heart structures compared to 2D echocardiography.

=== Contrast echocardiography ===
The introduction of ultrasound contrast agents for contrast echocardiography has significantly improved the usefulness of echocardiography in diagnosing and assessing coronary artery disease. Ultrasound contrast is used for assessing left ventricular ejection fraction at rest and during stress echocardiography. Contrast echocardiography can simultaneously assess regional myocardial function and perfusion, allowing for the non-invasive diagnosis of coronary artery disease. It has several advantages compared to other non-invasive imaging techniques, such as being performed without radiation exposure and potential nephrotoxicity. Contrast echocardiography requires intravenous administration of an ultrasound contrast agent during contrast specific ultrasound imaging.

== Magnetic resonance imaging (MRI) ==
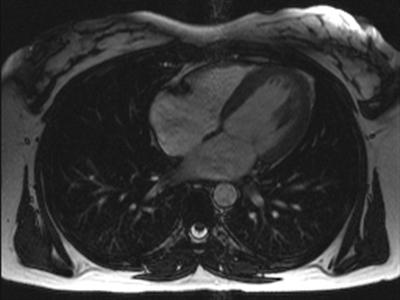
Axial MRI image at the level of the heart

Magnetic resonance imaging visualizes the heart by detecting hydrogen atoms using superconducting magnets, particularly those attached to water and fat molecules. These hydrogen atoms possess a property known as nuclear spin. Although the direction of this spin is usually random, the spin can be aligned using a powerful magnetic field. Faint electromagnetic signals are emitted by these hydrogen atoms when their alignment is temporarily disturbed which can be detected and used to create an image of the heart.

Cardiovascular magnetic resonance (MR) technology is able to measure the size, shape, function, and tissue characteristics of the heart in a single session. It is also commonly used to determine ventricular function and for the evaluation of structural heart disease. It is more reproducible than echocardiography with less inter-observer variability, allowing for more precise reference ranges to better distinguish health from disease. Additionally, MR lacks ionizing radiation and does not have any known long-term effects, making it safe for repeated imaging.

Additional benefits from cardiac MRI include the ability to detect scar within the heart using late gadolinium enhancement, and identify other abnormalities of the heart muscle itself such as infiltration with iron or amyloid protein. Disadvantages of MRI include lengthy protocols and the potential for claustrophobia. Furthermore, an MRI scan cannot be performed in some people who have metallic implants such as some types of pacemakers, defibrillators, although many modern pacemakers are safe for use within an MRI scanner. Other metal structures such as artificial valves and coronary stents are generally not problematic. However, MR is less widely available and may be more difficult for patients to tolerate than other noninvasive modalities, requiring physician monitoring for complex cases.

Recent development in deep learning and convolutional neural network techniques have made it possible to analyze and quantify some aspects of cardiac MRI automatically. The use of cardiac MRI is projected to increase through greater availability of scanners and more widespread knowledge about its clinical application.

== Computed tomography (CT) ==
Computed tomography (CT) provides simultaneous evaluation of multiple systems. A downside to CT scans are that they subject the patient to ionizing radiation, but technological improvements are lessening the amount. CT is best employed in low-to-intermediate-risk patients and is often used when other noninvasive tests are equivocal or abnormal. The Wells' score for pulmonary embolism or the Diamond-Forrester chest pain criteria and Thrombolysis in Myocardial Infarction (TIMI) score can help select appropriate patients for CT.

=== Coronary computed tomography angiography (CCTA) ===
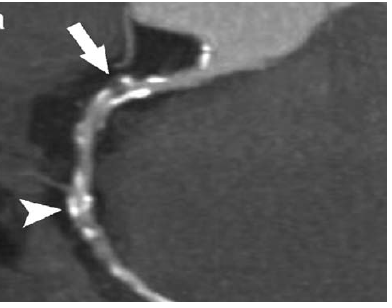
Image of contrast enhanced dual-source coronary CT-angiograph

Computed tomography angiography (CTA) is an imaging methodology using a ring-shaped machine with an X-ray source spinning around the circular path so as to bathe the inner circle with a uniform and known X-ray density. Cardiology uses are growing with the incredible developments in CT technology. Currently, multidetector CT, specially the 64 detector-CT are allowing to make cardiac studies in just a few seconds (less than 10 seconds, depending on the equipment and protocol used). These images are reconstructed using algorithms and software.

=== Gated cardiac CT (CCT) ===
Cardiac CT (CCT) is a modified form of the traditional chest CT due to the difficulty of imaging the complex, moving heart. This is achieved through the use of thin slices and high-resolution scanning, as well as the addition of electrocardiogram (ECG) gating or triggering to capture a motion-free image. Standard CT scans are acquired in either Axial or Helical modes, while CCT adds the ECG gating dimension to these modes to capture images of the heart. These modifications are necessary to obtain the required data from the planar slice images, which are reconstructed from back-projected transmitted data obtained by radial excursion of the X-ray tube and detector.

=== Coronary CT calcium scan ===
A coronary CT calcium scan is a computed tomography (CT) scan of the heart for the assessment of severity of coronary artery disease. Specifically, it looks for calcium deposits in the coronary arteries that can narrow arteries and increase the risk of heart attack. This severity can be presented as Agatston score or Coronary Artery Calcium (CAC) score. The CAC score is an independent marker of risk for cardiac events, cardiac mortality, and all-cause mortality. In addition, it provides additional prognostic information to other cardiovascular risk markers. A typical coronary CT calcium scan is done without the use of radiocontrast dye, but it can possibly be done from contrast-enhanced images as well, such as in coronary CT angiography.

== Nuclear medicine imaging ==
=== Positron emission tomography (PET) ===
Positron emission tomography (PET) is a nuclear medicine imaging methodology that tracks positron emitting radioisotopes. PET enables visual image analysis of multiple different metabolic chemical processes and is thus one of the most flexible imaging technologies. Cardiology uses are growing very slowly due to technical and relative cost difficulties. Most uses are for research, not clinical purposes. Appropriate radioisotopes of elements within chemical compounds of the metabolic pathway being examined are used to make the location of the chemical compounds of interest visible in a PET image.

PET tracers emit positrons, which are nearly identical to negatively charged electrons, but have the opposite charge and are considered antimatter. When a positron and an electron come close together, they annihilate each other, producing two gamma rays that travel in opposite directions. PET scanners detect these gamma rays to produce images showing the location of the positrons and the metabolic processes in the body. The accuracy of the image depends on the initial speed of the emitted positron, which affects the ability of the scanner to define the position of radioactive atoms in the body.

==== PET/CT scans ====
Most new PET scanners are combined with a CT scanner, a type of X-ray machine. Using the CT scan instead of the traditional rotating rod source transmission scan reduces the scan time and produces almost noise-free images. The two scanners are located in the same machine, but they do not perform scans at the same time. A CT scan is typically done first, followed by a PET scan. For cardiac scans, combining CT cardiac data with PET metabolic or perfusion data from PET/CT machines may be of clinical value. While there are unresolved issues with using a high-speed CT scan for attenuation correction of cardiac images, many new CT scanners are marketed with PET scanners and can be used to measure myocardial thickening, which is a useful adjunct to PET physiological imaging.

==== PET/MRI scans ====
PET/MRI systems combine the capabilities of positron emission tomography (PET) and magnetic resonance imaging (MRI) to provide both functional and morphological information in various clinical applications. Cardiac MRI can produce complementary data to increase accuracy and reproducibility to PET scans, especially in systemic diseases, inflammatory processes, assessing risk of atherosclerotic plaque rupture, and stem cell tracking. PET/MRI systems come in two types: tandem, in-line systems where two imagers share a patient transport system for sequential acquisitions, and integrated systems where both scanners operate simultaneously. The latter has some performance limitations, but it may be essential in some applications, such as cardiac perfusion and metabolism. PET/MRI is still in its early stages, and more work is needed to establish it as a widespread and cost-effective clinical tool for cardiac imaging.

=== Single photon emission computed tomography (SPECT) ===
Single photon emission computed tomography (SPECT), a nuclear medicine imaging methodology using gamma rays emitted by a radioactive tracer injected into the blood stream, which ultimately distributes into the heart. SPECT provides information about blood flow to the heart and how well the heart is functioning. It is commonly used to evaluate patients who have, or are suspected to have, coronary artery disease and is additionally used for myocardial perfusion imaging. The accuracy of the test depends on the technical quality of the study, and interpreting the results requires knowledge of the physics and technical aspects of the procedure.

== Associated invasive cardiac imaging techniques ==
=== Coronary catheterization ===
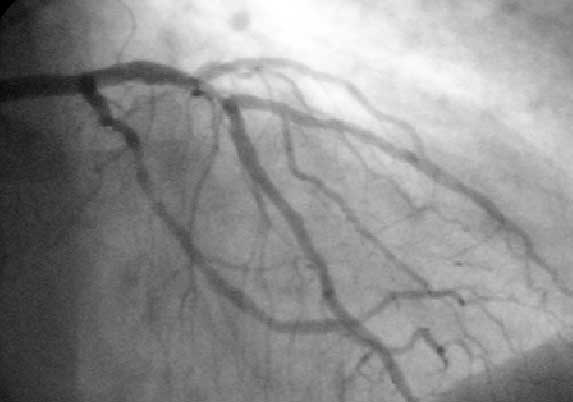
A coronary angiogram showing the left coronary circulation

Coronary catheterization uses pressure monitoring and blood sampling through a catheter inserted into the heart through blood vessels in the leg or wrist to determine the functioning of the heart, and, following injections of radiocontrast dye, uses X-ray fluoroscopy, typically at 30 frames per second, to visualize the position and volume of blood within the heart chambers and arteries. Coronary angiography is performed during a cardiac catheterization and used to determine the patency and configuration of the coronary artery lumens.

==== Intravascular ultrasound ====
An intravascular ultrasound image of the ostium of the left main coronary artery

Intravascular ultrasound, also known as a percutaneous echocardiogram, is an imaging methodology using specially designed, long, thin, complex manufactured catheters attached to computerized ultrasound equipment to visualize the lumen and the interior wall of blood vessels.

==== Fractional flow reserve ====
Fractional flow reserve (FFR) examines the pressure drop across the stenosis in suspected ischemic coronary artery that may require percutaneous coronary intervention (PCI) or coronary artery bypass surgery.
