= Isotopes of rubidium =

Isotopes of rubidium (_{37}Rb)
| Main isotopes | | | Decay | |
| Isotope | abundance | half-life (t_{1/2}) | mode | product |
|---|---|---|---|---|
| ^{82}Rb | synth | 1.2575 m | β^{+} | ^{82}Kr |
| ^{83}Rb | synth | 86.2 d | ε | ^{83}Kr |
| ^{84}Rb | synth | 32.82 d | β^{+} | ^{84}Kr |
| ^{84}Rb | synth | 32.82 d | β^{−} | ^{84}Sr |
| ^{85}Rb | 72.2% | stable | | |
| ^{86}Rb | synth | 18.645 d | β^{−} | ^{86}Sr |
| ^{86}Rb | synth | 18.645 d | ε | ^{86}Kr |
| ^{87}Rb | 27.8% | 4.97×10^{10} y | β^{−} | ^{87}Sr |

Standard atomic weight A_{r}°(Rb)
- 85.4678±0.0003; 85.468±0.001 (abridged)

Rubidium (_{37}Rb) has 35 known isotopes, from ^{72}Rb to ^{106}Rb, with naturally occurring rubidium composed of two: stable ^{85}Rb (72.2%) and radioactive ^{87}Rb (27.8%). The primordial radionuclide ^{87}Rb has a half-life of 4.97×10^{10} years, beta decaying to stable ^{87}Sr. It is, as the element is, widespread on Earth as rubidium readily substitutes for potassium in all minerals. The decay of ^{87}Rb has been used extensively in dating rocks; see rubidium–strontium dating for a more detailed discussion.

Other than ^{87}Rb, the longest-lived radioisotopes are ^{83}Rb with a half-life of 86.2 days, ^{84}Rb with a half-life of 32.82 days, and ^{86}Rb with a half-life of 18.645 days. All other radioisotopes have half-lives less than a day, most less than 20 minutes. Of the isomeric states the most stable is ^{82m}Rb at 6.472 hours.

The ground state of ^{82}Rb has a much shorter half-life of 1.2575 minutes. It is used medically in some cardiac positron emission tomography scans to assess myocardial perfusion. It is synthesized through the longer-lived ^{82}Sr, made in a cyclotron, though a generator. It may be administered as the chloride.

== List of isotopes ==
| Nuclide (Note: ^{m}Rb – Excited nuclear isomer.) | Z | N | Isotopic mass (Da) (Note: ( ) – Uncertainty (1σ) is given in concise form in parentheses after the corresponding last digits.) (Note: # – Atomic mass marked #: value and uncertainty derived not from purely experimental data, but at least partly from trends from the Mass Surface (TMS).) | Discovery year | Half-life (Note: Bold half-life – nearly stable, half-life longer than age of universe.) (Note: # – Values marked # are not purely derived from experimental data, but at least partly from trends of neighboring nuclides (TNN).) | Decay mode (Note: Modes of decay: EC: / Electron capture; IT: / Isomeric transition; n: / Neutron emission; p: / Proton emission) | Daughter isotope (Note: Bold italics symbol as daughter – Daughter product is nearly stable.) (Note: Bold symbol as daughter – Daughter product is stable.) | Spin and parity (Note: ( ) spin value – Indicates spin with weak assignment arguments.) | Natural abundance (mole fraction) | |
| Nuclide | Excitation energy | | | Discovery year | Half-life | Decay mode | Daughter isotope | Spin and parity | Normal proportion | Range of variation |
|---|---|---|---|---|---|---|---|---|---|---|
| ^{72}Rb | 37 | 35 | 71.95885(54)# | 2017 | 103(22) ns | p | ^{71}Kr | 1+# | | |
| ^{73}Rb | 37 | 36 | 72.950605(44) | 1993 | <81 ns | p | ^{72}Kr | 3/2−# | | |
| ^{74}Rb | 37 | 37 | 73.9442659(32) | 1977 | 64.78(3) ms | β^{+} | ^{74}Kr | 0+ | | |
| ^{75}Rb | 37 | 38 | 74.9385732(13) | 1975 | 19.0(12) s | β^{+} | ^{75}Kr | 3/2− | | |
| ^{76}Rb | 37 | 39 | 75.9350730(10) | 1969 | 36.5(6) s | β^{+} | ^{76}Kr | 1− | | |
| ^{76}Rb | 37 | 39 | 75.9350730(10) | 1969 | 36.5(6) s | β^{+}, α (3.8×10^{−7}%) | ^{72}Se | 1− | | |
| ^{76m}Rb | 316.93(8) keV | | | 1986 | 3.050(7) μs | IT | ^{76}Rb | (4+) | | |
| ^{77}Rb | 37 | 40 | 76.9304016(14) | 1972 | 3.78(4) min | β^{+} | ^{77}Kr | 3/2− | | |
| ^{78}Rb | 37 | 41 | 77.9281419(35) | 1968 | 17.66(3) min | β^{+} | ^{78}Kr | 0+ | | |
| ^{78m1}Rb | 46.84(14) keV | | | 1972 | 910(40) ns | IT | ^{78}Rb | (1−) | | |
| ^{78m2}Rb | 111.19(22) keV | | | 1996 | 5.74(3) min | β^{+} (91%) | ^{78}Kr | 4− | | |
| ^{78m2}Rb | 111.19(22) keV | | | 1996 | 5.74(3) min | IT (9%) | ^{78}Rb | 4− | | |
| ^{79}Rb | 37 | 42 | 78.9239901(21) | 1957 | 22.9(5) min | β^{+} | ^{79}Kr | 5/2+ | | |
| ^{80}Rb | 37 | 43 | 79.9225164(20) | 1961 | 33.4(7) s | β^{+} | ^{80}Kr | 1+ | | |
| ^{80m}Rb | 493.9(5) keV | | | 1996 | 1.63(4) μs | IT | ^{80}Rb | (6+) | | |
| ^{81}Rb | 37 | 44 | 80.9189939(53) | 1949 | 4.572(4) h | β^{+} | ^{81}Kr | 3/2− | | |
| ^{81m}Rb | 86.31(7) keV | | | 1977 | 30.5(3) min | IT (97.6%) | ^{81}Rb | 9/2+ | | |
| ^{81m}Rb | 86.31(7) keV | | | 1977 | 30.5(3) min | β^{+} (2.4%) | ^{81}Kr | 9/2+ | | |
| ^{82}Rb | 37 | 45 | 81.9182090(32) | 1949 | 1.2575(2) min | β^{+} | ^{82}Kr | 1+ | | |
| ^{82m}Rb | 69.0(15) keV | | | 1953 | 6.472(6) h | β^{+} | ^{82}Kr | 5− | | |
| ^{83}Rb | 37 | 46 | 82.9151142(25) | 1950 | 86.2(1) d | EC | ^{83}Kr | 5/2− | | |
| ^{83m}Rb | 42.0780(20) keV | | | 1968 | 7.8(7) ms | IT | ^{83}Rb | 9/2+ | | |
| ^{84}Rb | 37 | 47 | 83.9143752(24) | 1947 | 32.82(7) d | β^{+} (96.1%) | ^{84}Kr | 2− | | |
| ^{84}Rb | 37 | 47 | 83.9143752(24) | 1947 | 32.82(7) d | β^{−} (3.9%) | ^{84}Sr | 2− | | |
| ^{84m}Rb | 463.59(8) keV | | | 1950 | 20.26(4) min | IT | ^{84}Rb | 6− | | |
| ^{85}Rb (Note: Fission product) | 37 | 48 | 84.9117897360(54) | 1921 | Stable | | | 5/2− | 0.7217(2) | |
| ^{85m}Rb | 514.0065(22) keV | | | 1952 | 1.015(1) μs | IT | ^{85}Rb | 9/2+ | | |
| ^{86}Rb | 37 | 49 | 85.91116744(21) | 1941 | 18.645(8) d | β^{−} (99.9948%) | ^{86}Sr | 2− | | |
| ^{86}Rb | 37 | 49 | 85.91116744(21) | 1941 | 18.645(8) d | EC (0.0052%) | ^{86}Kr | 2− | | |
| ^{86m}Rb | 556.05(18) keV | | | 1951 | 1.017(3) min | IT | ^{86}Rb | 6− | | |
| ^{87}Rb (Note: Primordial radionuclide) (Note: Used in rubidium–strontium dating) | 37 | 50 | 86.909180529(6) | 1921 | 4.97(3)×10^{10} y | β^{−} | ^{87}Sr | 3/2− | 0.2783(2) | |
| ^{88}Rb | 37 | 51 | 87.91131559(17) | 1939 | 17.78(3) min | β^{−} | ^{88}Sr | 2− | | |
| ^{88m}Rb | 1373.8(3) keV | | | 2009 | 123(13) ns | IT | ^{88}Rb | (7+) | | |
| ^{89}Rb | 37 | 52 | 88.9122781(58) | 1940 | 15.32(10) min | β^{−} | ^{89}Sr | 3/2− | | |
| ^{90}Rb | 37 | 53 | 89.9147976(69) | 1951 | 158(5) s | β^{−} | ^{90}Sr | 0− | | |
| ^{90m}Rb | 106.90(3) keV | | | 1967 | 258(4) s | β^{−} (97.4%) | ^{90}Sr | 3− | | |
| ^{90m}Rb | 106.90(3) keV | | | 1967 | 258(4) s | IT (2.6%) | ^{90} Rb | 3− | | |
| ^{91}Rb | 37 | 54 | 90.9165373(84) | 1951 | 58.2(3) s | β^{−} | ^{91}Sr | 3/2− | | |
| ^{92}Rb | 37 | 55 | 91.9197285(66) | 1960 | 4.48(3) s | β^{−} (99.99%) | ^{92}Sr | 0− | | |
| ^{92}Rb | 37 | 55 | 91.9197285(66) | 1960 | 4.48(3) s | β^{−}, n (0.0107%) | ^{91}Sr | 0− | | |
| ^{93}Rb | 37 | 56 | 92.9220393(84) | 1960 | 5.84(2) s | β^{−} (98.61%) | ^{93}Sr | 5/2− | | |
| ^{93}Rb | 37 | 56 | 92.9220393(84) | 1960 | 5.84(2) s | β^{−}, n (1.39%) | ^{92}Sr | 5/2− | | |
| ^{93m}Rb | 4423.1(15) keV | | | 2010 | 111(11) ns | IT | ^{93}Rb | (27/2−) | | |
| ^{94}Rb | 37 | 57 | 93.9263948(22) | 1961 | 2.702(5) s | β^{−} (89.7%) | ^{94}Sr | 3− | | |
| ^{94}Rb | 37 | 57 | 93.9263948(22) | 1961 | 2.702(5) s | β^{−}, n (10.3%) | ^{93}Sr | 3− | | |
| ^{94m1}Rb | 104.2(2) keV | | | 2008 | 130(15) ns | IT | ^{94}Rb | (0−) | | |
| ^{94m2}Rb | 2074.9(14) keV | | | 2016 | 107(16) ns | IT | ^{94}Rb | (10−) | | |
| ^{95}Rb | 37 | 58 | 94.929264(22) | 1967 | 377.7(8) ms | β^{−} (91.3%) | ^{95}Sr | 5/2− | | |
| ^{95}Rb | 37 | 58 | 94.929264(22) | 1967 | 377.7(8) ms | β^{−}, n (8.7%) | ^{94}Sr | 5/2− | | |
| ^{95m}Rb | 835.0(6) keV | | | 2009 | <500 ns | IT | ^{95}Rb | 9/2+# | | |
| ^{96}Rb | 37 | 59 | 95.9341334(36) | 1967 | 201.5(9) ms | β^{−} (86.3%) | ^{96}Sr | 2− | | |
| ^{96}Rb | 37 | 59 | 95.9341334(36) | 1967 | 201.5(9) ms | β^{−}, n (13.7%) | ^{95}Sr | 2− | | |
| ^{96m1}Rb (Note: Order of ground state and isomer is uncertain.) | 0(200)# keV | | | (1981) (Note: Half-life not measured, only circumstantial evidence for the isomeric state) | 200# ms [>1 ms] | | | 1(+#) | | |
| ^{96m2}Rb | 1134.6(11) keV | | | 1999 | 1.80(4) μs | IT | ^{96}Rb | (10−) | | |
| ^{97}Rb | 37 | 60 | 96.9371771(21) | 1969 | 169.1(6) ms | β^{−} (74.5%) | ^{97}Sr | 3/2+ | | |
| ^{97}Rb | 37 | 60 | 96.9371771(21) | 1969 | 169.1(6) ms | β^{−}, n (25.5%) | ^{96}Sr | 3/2+ | | |
| ^{97m}Rb | 76.6(2) keV | | | 2012 | 5.7(6) μs | IT | ^{97}Rb | (1/2,3/2)− | | |
| ^{98}Rb | 37 | 61 | 97.941632(17) | 1971 | 115(6) ms | β^{−}(85.65%) | ^{98}Sr | (0−) | | |
| ^{98}Rb | 37 | 61 | 97.941632(17) | 1971 | 115(6) ms | β^{−}, n (14.3%) | ^{97}Sr | (0−) | | |
| ^{98}Rb | 37 | 61 | 97.941632(17) | 1971 | 115(6) ms | β^{−}, 2n (0.054%) | ^{96}Sr | (0−) | | |
| ^{98m1}Rb | 73(26) keV | | | 1980 | 96(3) ms | β^{−} | ^{98}Sr | (3+) | | |
| ^{98m2}Rb | 178.5(4) keV | | | 2009 | 358(7) ns | IT | ^{98}Rb | (2−) | | |
| ^{99}Rb | 37 | 62 | 98.9451192(43) | 1971 | 54(4) ms | β^{−} (82.7%) | ^{99}Sr | (3/2+) | | |
| ^{99}Rb | 37 | 62 | 98.9451192(43) | 1971 | 54(4) ms | β^{−}, n (17.3%) | ^{98}Sr | (3/2+) | | |
| ^{100}Rb | 37 | 63 | 99.950332(14) | 1978 | 51.3(16) ms | β^{−} (94.3%) | ^{100}Sr | 4−# | | |
| ^{100}Rb | 37 | 63 | 99.950332(14) | 1978 | 51.3(16) ms | β^{−}, n (5.6%) | ^{99}Sr | 4−# | | |
| ^{100}Rb | 37 | 63 | 99.950332(14) | 1978 | 51.3(16) ms | β^{−}, 2n (0.15%) | ^{98}Sr | 4−# | | |
| ^{101}Rb | 37 | 64 | 100.954302(22) | 1992 | 31.8(33) ms | β^{−} (72%) | ^{101}Sr | 3/2+# | | |
| ^{101}Rb | 37 | 64 | 100.954302(22) | 1992 | 31.8(33) ms | β^{−}, n (28%) | ^{100}Sr | 3/2+# | | |
| ^{102}Rb | 37 | 65 | 101.960008(89) | 1995 | 37(4) ms | β^{−}, n (65%) | ^{101}Sr | (4+) | | |
| ^{102}Rb | 37 | 65 | 101.960008(89) | 1995 | 37(4) ms | β^{−} (35%) | ^{102}Sr | (4+) | | |
| ^{103}Rb | 37 | 66 | 102.96440(43)# | 2010 | 26(11) ms | β^{−} | ^{103}Sr | 3/2+# | | |
| ^{104}Rb | 37 | 67 | 103.97053(54)# | 2018 | 35# ms [>550 ns] | | | | | |
| ^{105}Rb | 37 | 68 | | 2021 | | | | | | |
| ^{106}Rb | 37 | 69 | | 2021 | | | | | | |
This table header & footer:

== Rubidium-87 ==
Rubidium-87 is one of two natural isotopes of rubidium, with an abundance of 27.835%, and a half-life of 4.97×10^{10} years, with beta decay to strontium-87, a stable isotope.

During fractional crystallization of igneous rock, Sr tends to become concentrated in plagioclase, leaving Rb in the liquid phase. Hence, the Rb/Sr ratio in residual magma may increase over time, resulting in rocks with increasing Rb/Sr ratios with increasing differentiation. The highest ratios (10 or higher) occur in pegmatites. The age of a mineral, if it has not been subsequently altered, is determined by the parent and daughter abundances, the half-life, and the original content of the daughter, here strontium; the ^{87}Sr/^{86}Sr ratio helps in its calculation. See rubidium-strontium dating for further detail.

Rubidium-87 was the first and the most popular atom for making Bose–Einstein condensates in dilute atomic gases. Even though rubidium-85 is more abundant, rubidium-87 has a positive scattering length, which means it is mutually repulsive, at low temperatures. This prevents a collapse of all but the smallest condensates. It is also easy to evaporatively cool, with a consistent strong mutual scattering. There is also a strong supply of cheap uncoated diode lasers typically used in CD writers, which can operate at the correct wavelength.

== See also ==
Daughter products other than rubidium

- Isotopes of strontium
- Isotopes of krypton
- Isotopes of selenium
