= RBCL =

RBCL may refer to:

- RbCl or Rubidium chloride, an alkali metal halide
- rbcL or RuBisCO large subunit, a plant gene
