= Cardiac PET =

- ICD-10-PCS: C23G, C23Y
- OPS-301 code: 3-741

Cardiac PET (or cardiac positron emission tomography) is a form of diagnostic imaging in which the presence of heart disease is evaluated using a PET scanner. Intravenous injection of a radiotracer is performed as part of the scan. Commonly used radiotracers are Rubidium-82, Nitrogen-13 ammonia and Oxygen-15 water.

== Uses ==
Cardiac PET-CT scan can assess blood flow, metabolism, inflammation, innervation, and receptor density accurately. Besides, it is also useful to detect heart conditions such as coronary artery disease, cardiac amyloidosis, and cardiac sarcoidosis.

== Radiopharmaceuticals ==
Rubidium-82 is produced from the decay of Strontium-82 through electron capture in a generator. It is used to access the blood vessels supplying the heart. Strontium-82 has a half-life of 25.5 days while Rubidium-82 has a half-life of 76 seconds. Heart muscles can take up Rubidium-82 efficiently through sodium–potassium pump. Compared with Technetium-99m, Rubidium-82 has higher uptake by the heart muscles. However, Rubidium-82 has lower uptake by heart muscles when compared to N-13 ammonia. But the positron energy emitted by Rubidium-82 is higher than N-13 ammonia and Fluorodeoxyglucose (18F). On the other hand, the positron range (the distance travelled by a positron from its production site until its annihilation with an electron) is longer when compared to other radiopharmaceuticals, causing reduced image resolution.

Myocardium has higher uptake for N-13 ammonia when compared to Rubidium-82, thus useful for myocardial perfusion imaging. However, its half-life is only 9.96 minutes. Therefore, on-site facilities such as cyclotron and radiochemistry synthesis facilities should be available. There may be patchy uptake if the subject has defects in lateral ventricular wall. N-13 ammonia may occasionally be degraded by liver, thus causing reduced visibility of the inferior wall of the heart. N-13 ammonia uptake by the lungs is minimal.

Oxygen-15 (O-15) water is considered the gold standard for non-invasive calculation of myocardial blood flow (MBF), and has high accuracy in detecting significant flow-limiting stenosis in coronary artery disease. O-15 water is metabolically inert, freely diffusable and has an extraction fraction from blood to tissue of close to 100%. Since O-15 water has no uptake in myocytes, static imaging is of no use and dynamic scanning with kinetic modeling is a requirement. Calculation of MBF can be based on both influx and efflux of O-15 water. This allows for calculation of the perfusable tissue fraction (PTF) which can be used to automatically correct for partial volume effects, otherwise commonly affecting the quantification. The half-life of O-15 is 122s which necessitates a nearby cyclotron and has previously limited widespread use of the technique. New advances with higher availability of small dedicated cyclotrons and development of bed-side production/injection systems has, however, lead to an increase of O-15 water utilization. While the short half-life has its drawbacks, it provides a low radiation dose and (as for Rubidium-82) allows for rest and stress imaging to be performed in the same session. A routine protocol can be performed in approximately 30 min.

The most newly developed tracer for clinical use in myocardial perfusion imaging is Flurine-18 (F-18)-flurpiridaz. The tracer was approved by the U.S. Food and Drug Administration (FDA) in 2024. Flurpiridaz is derived from the pesticide pydidaben and binds to the mithocondrial complex 1 in myocytes. F-18-flurpiridaz has high extraction fraction, low positron range, and considerably longer half-life (110 min) compared to the other PET-tracers used in myocardial perfusion imaging. The long half-life allows for shipment from production centers to imaging centers without a cyclotron or generator, and can thus potentially allow more widespread use of cardiac PET.

== Indications ==
- Patients with many risk factors e.g. hypertension, high cholesterol, smoking habit, diabetes, obesity, high stress occupation, family history of heart attack
- Patients who are unable to exercise
- Patients suspected of heart attack
- Patients newly diagnosed with heart failure
- Patients with abnormal ECG or treadmill

== Requirements ==
- Facility: taking into consideration clinical workflow, as well as regulatory requirements such as requisite shielding from radiation exposure
- Capital equipment: PET or PET/CT scanner
- Radiopharmaceutical: Rubidium-82 generator system or close access to cyclotron produced isotopes such as Nitrogen-13 ammonia
- Personnel: including specially trained physician, radiographers, radiation safety supervisors and optional nursing support
- Operations: stress test monitoring, as well as emergency response equipment, processing and review workstations, administrative and support personnel are additional considerations
