= Lithium chloride (data page) =

Chemical data page

This page provides supplementary chemical data on lithium chloride.

== Solubility ==
Solubility of LiCl in various solvents (g LiCl / 100g of solvent at 25 °C)
H_{2}O	84.5
Liquid ammonia	3.02
Liquid sulfur dioxide	0.012
Methanol	21 - 41
Formic acid	27.5
Sulfolane	1.5
Acetonitrile	0.14
Acetone	0.83
Formamide	28.2
Dimethylformamide	11 - 28
Reference: Burgess, J. Metal Ions in Solution (Ellis Horwood, New York, 1978); ISBN 0-85312-027-7

== Thermodynamic properties ==
Phase behavior
Triple point	? K (? °C), ? Pa
Critical point	? K (? °C), ? Pa
Std enthalpy of fusionΔ_{fus}H^{~~o~~}	+19.9 kJ/mol
Std entropy of fusionΔ_{fus}S^{~~o~~}	? J/(mol·K)
Std enthalpy of vaporizationΔ_{vap}H^{~~o~~}	? kJ/mol
Std entropy of vaporizationΔ_{vap}S^{~~o~~}	? J/(mol·K)
Solid properties
Std enthalpy of formation Δ_{f}H^{~~o~~}_{solid}	−408.27 kJ/mol
Standard molar entropy S^{~~o~~}_{solid}	59.33 J/(mol K)
Heat capacity c_{p}	47.99 J/(mol K)
Liquid properties
Std enthalpy of formation Δ_{f}H^{~~o~~}_{liquid}	−390.76 kJ/mol
Standard molar entropy S^{~~o~~}_{liquid}	? J/(mol K)
Heat capacity c_{p}	? J/(mol K)
Gas properties
Std enthalpy of formation Δ_{f}H^{~~o~~}_{gas}	−195.2 kJ/mol
Standard molar entropy S^{~~o~~}_{gas}	212.7 J/(mol K)
Heat capacity c_{p}	33.2 J/(mol K)

== Spectral data ==
UV-Vis
Lambda-max	? nm
Extinction coefficient	?
IR
Major absorption bands	? cm^{−1}
NMR
Proton NMR
Carbon-13 NMR
Other NMR data
MS
Masses of main fragments

== Structure and properties data ==
Structure and properties
Index of refraction	1.662
Dielectric constant	? C^{2}/(N·m^{2}) at ? °C
Bond strength	?
Bond length	?
Magnetic susceptibility	-24.3 cgs units

== Temperature Relative Humidity over saturated solution in water ==
Temperature(C)	Relative Humidity(%)
0.23	14.7
9.56	13.4
19.22	12.4
29.64	11.8
39.64	11.8
46.76	11.4

== Material Safety Data Sheet ==
The handling of this chemical may incur notable safety precautions. It is highly recommend that you seek the Material Safety Datasheet (MSDS) for this chemical from a reliable source such as SIRI, and follow its directions.

This box:
- Except where noted otherwise, data relate to Standard temperature and pressure.
- Reliability of data general note.
