= Rubidium =

Rubidium, _{37}Rb
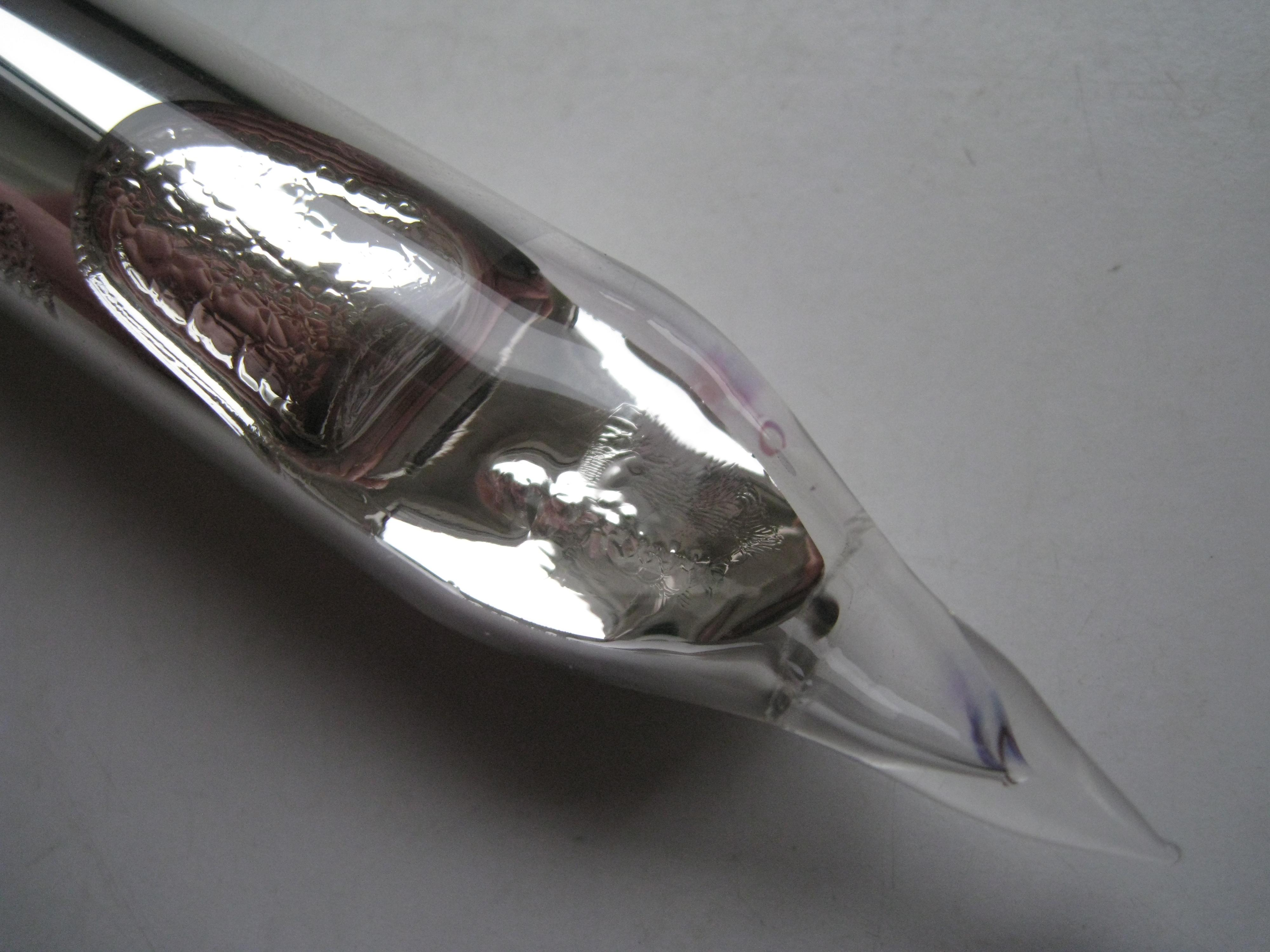

Rubidium
- Pronunciation: /ruːˈbɪdiəm/ (roo-BID-ee-əm)
- Appearance: grey white

Standard atomic weight A_{r}°(Rb)
- 85.4678±0.0003; 85.468±0.001 (abridged)

Rubidium in the periodic table
Hydrogen																															Helium
Lithium	Beryllium																									Boron	Carbon	Nitrogen	Oxygen	Fluorine	Neon
Sodium	Magnesium																									Aluminium	Silicon	Phosphorus	Sulfur	Chlorine	Argon
Potassium	Calcium															Scandium	Titanium	Vanadium	Chromium	Manganese	Iron	Cobalt	Nickel	Copper	Zinc	Gallium	Germanium	Arsenic	Selenium	Bromine	Krypton
Rubidium	Strontium															Yttrium	Zirconium	Niobium	Molybdenum	Technetium	Ruthenium	Rhodium	Palladium	Silver	Cadmium	Indium	Tin	Antimony	Tellurium	Iodine	Xenon
Caesium	Barium	Lanthanum	Cerium	Praseodymium	Neodymium	Promethium	Samarium	Europium	Gadolinium	Terbium	Dysprosium	Holmium	Erbium	Thulium	Ytterbium	Lutetium	Hafnium	Tantalum	Tungsten	Rhenium	Osmium	Iridium	Platinum	Gold	Mercury (element)	Thallium	Lead	Bismuth	Polonium	Astatine	Radon
Francium	Radium	Actinium	Thorium	Protactinium	Uranium	Neptunium	Plutonium	Americium	Curium	Berkelium	Californium	Einsteinium	Fermium	Mendelevium	Nobelium	Lawrencium	Rutherfordium	Dubnium	Seaborgium	Bohrium	Hassium	Meitnerium	Darmstadtium	Roentgenium	Copernicium	Nihonium	Flerovium	Moscovium	Livermorium	Tennessine	Oganesson
K
↑
Rb
↓
Cs
krypton ← rubidium → strontium
- Atomic number (Z): 37
- Group: group 1: hydrogen and alkali metals
- Period: period 5
- Block: s-block
- Electron configuration: [Kr] 5s^{1}
- Electrons per shell: 2, 8, 18, 8, 1

Physical properties
- Phase at STP: solid
- Melting point: 312.45 K (39.30 °C, 102.74 °F)
- Boiling point: 961 K (688 °C, 1270 °F)
- Density (at 20° C): 1.534 g/cm^{3}
- when liquid (at m.p.): 1.46 g/cm^{3}
- Triple point: 312.41 K, ? kPa
- Critical point: 2093 K, 16 MPa (extrapolated)
- Heat of fusion: 2.19 kJ/mol
- Heat of vaporization: 69 kJ/mol
- Molar heat capacity: 31.060 J/(mol·K)
- Specific heat capacity: 363.411 J/(kg·K)
Vapor pressure
P (Pa)	1	10	100	1 k	10 k	100 k
at T (K)	434	486	552	641	769	958

Atomic properties
- Oxidation states: common: +1 −1
- Electronegativity: Pauling scale: 0.82
- Ionization energies: 1st: 403 kJ/mol; 2nd: 2632.1 kJ/mol; 3rd: 3859.4 kJ/mol
- Atomic radius: empirical: 248 pm
- Covalent radius: 220±9 pm
- Van der Waals radius: 303 pm
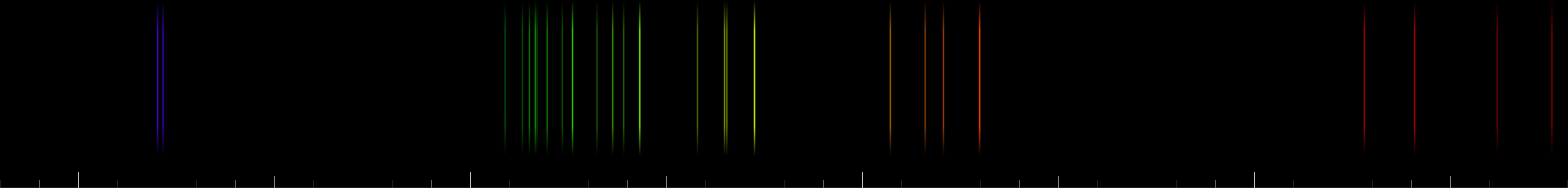
- Spectral lines of rubidium

Other properties
- Natural occurrence: primordial
- Crystal structure: body-centered cubic (bcc) (cI2)
- Lattice constant: a = 569.9 pm (at 20 °C)
- Thermal expansion: 85.6×10^{−6}/K (at 20 °C)
- Thermal conductivity: 58.2 W/(m⋅K)
- Electrical resistivity: 128 nΩ⋅m (at 20 °C)
- Magnetic ordering: paramagnetic
- Molar magnetic susceptibility: +17.0×10^{−6} cm^{3}/mol (303 K)
- Young's modulus: 2.4 GPa
- Bulk modulus: 2.5 GPa
- Speed of sound thin rod: 1300 m/s (at 20 °C)
- Mohs hardness: 0.3
- Brinell hardness: 0.216 MPa
- CAS Number: 7440-17-7

History
- Naming: from Latin rubidus, 'deep red', for the color of its emission spectrum
- Discovery: Gustav Kirchhoff and Robert Bunsen (1861)
- First isolation: George de Hevesy

Isotopes of rubidium
Main isotopes			Decay	
Isotope	abundance	half-life (t_{1/2})	mode	product
^{82}Rb	synth	1.2575 m	β^{+}	^{82}Kr
^{83}Rb	synth	86.2 d	ε	^{83}Kr
^{84}Rb	synth	32.82 d	β^{+}	^{84}Kr
^{84}Rb	synth	32.82 d	β^{−}	^{84}Sr
^{85}Rb	72.17%	stable		
^{86}Rb	synth	18.645 d	β^{−}	^{86}Sr
^{86}Rb	synth	18.645 d	ε	^{86}Kr
^{87}Rb	27.83%	4.97×10^{10} y	β^{−}	^{87}Sr

Rubidium is a chemical element; it has symbol Rb and atomic number 37. It is a very soft, whitish-grey solid in the alkali metal group, similar to potassium and caesium. Rubidium is the first alkali metal in the group to have a density higher than water. On Earth, natural rubidium comprises two isotopes: 72% is a stable isotope, ^{85}Rb, and 28% is the slightly radioactive ^{87}Rb, with a half-life of 48.8 billion years – more than three times as long as the estimated age of the universe.

German chemists Robert Bunsen and Gustav Kirchhoff discovered rubidium in 1861 by the newly developed technique, flame spectroscopy. The name comes from the Latin word rubidus, meaning deep red, the color of its emission spectrum. Rubidium's compounds have various chemical and electronic applications. Rubidium metal is easily vaporized and has a convenient spectral absorption range, making it a frequent target for laser manipulation of atoms. Rubidium is not a known nutrient for any living organisms. However, rubidium ions have similar properties and the same charge as potassium ions, and are actively taken up and treated by animal cells in similar ways.

== Characteristics ==
=== Physical properties ===
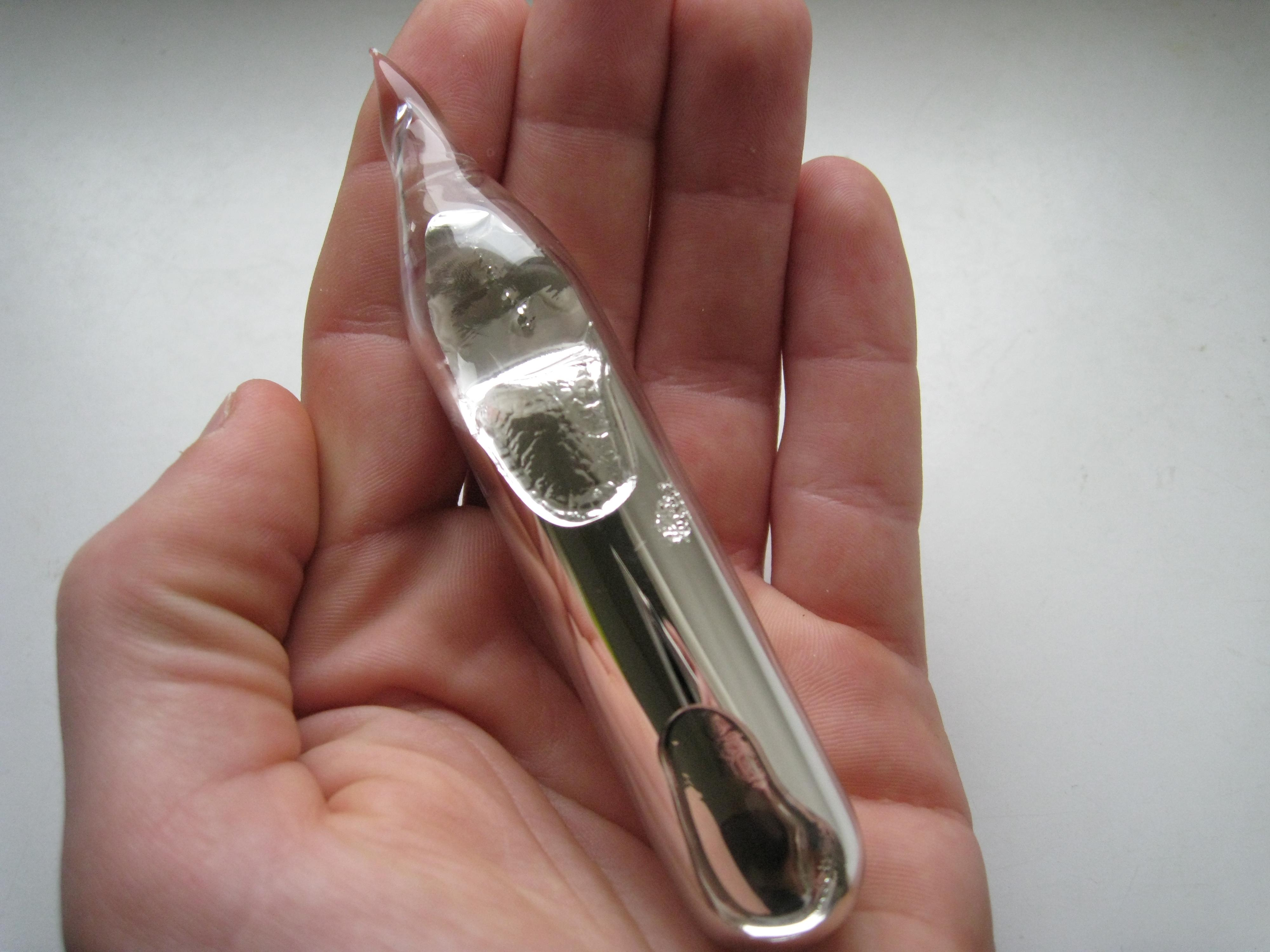
Partially molten rubidium metal in an ampoule

Rubidium is a very soft, ductile, silvery-white metal. It has a melting point of 39.3 °C (102.7 °F) and a boiling point of 688 °C (1,270 °F). It forms amalgams with mercury and alloys with gold, iron, caesium, sodium, and potassium, but not lithium (despite rubidium and lithium being in the same periodic group). Rubidium and potassium show a very similar purple color in the flame test, and distinguishing the two elements requires more sophisticated analysis, such as spectroscopy.

=== Chemical properties ===
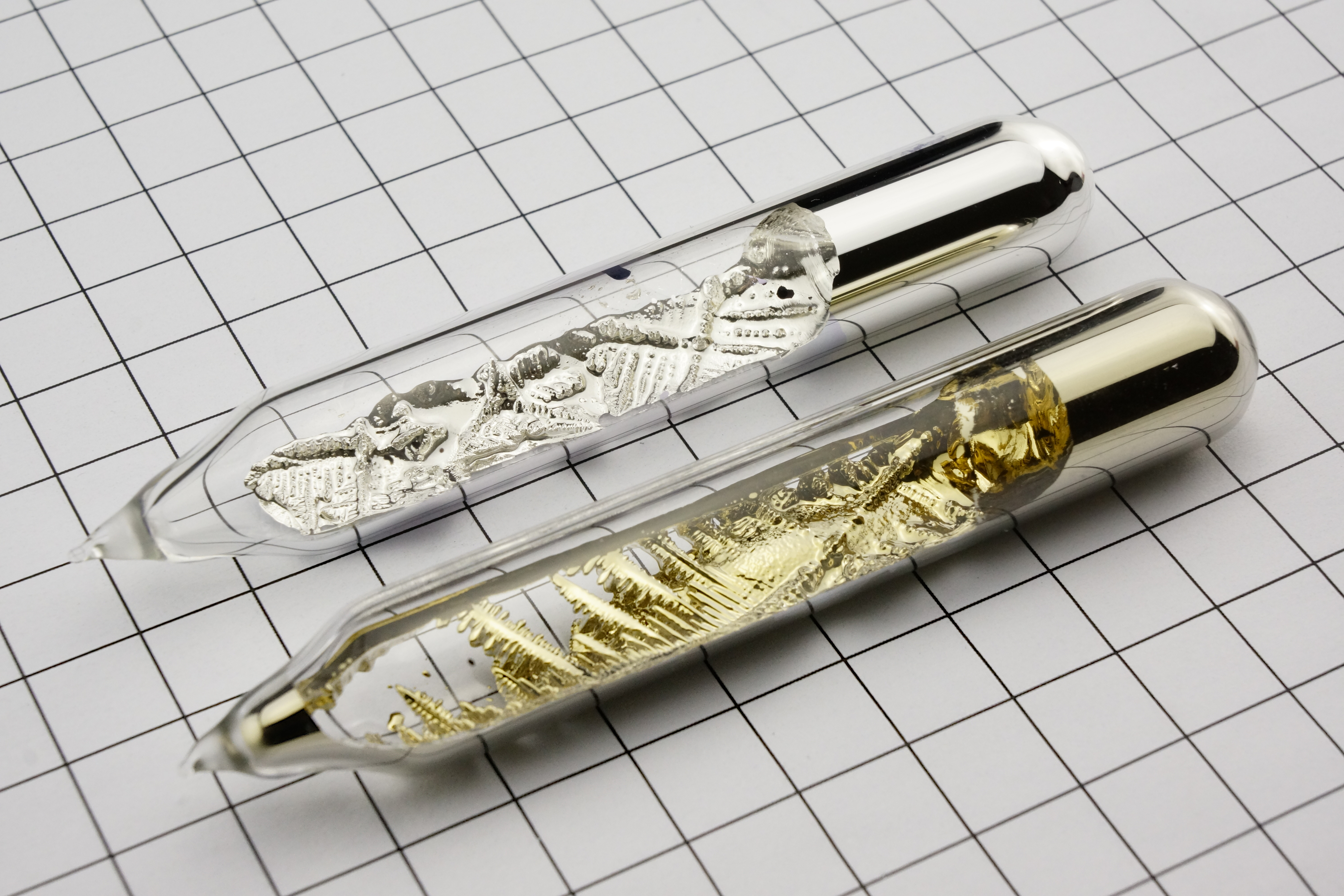
Rubidium crystals (silvery) compared to caesium crystals (golden)

Rubidium is the second most electropositive of the stable alkali metals and has a very low first ionization energy of only 403 kJ/mol. It has an electron configuration of [Kr]5s^{1} and is photosensitive. Due to its strong electropositive nature, rubidium reacts explosively with water to produce rubidium hydroxide and hydrogen gas. As with all the alkali metals, the reaction is usually vigorous enough to ignite metal or the hydrogen gas produced by the reaction, potentially causing an explosion. Rubidium, being denser than potassium, sinks in water, reacting violently; caesium explodes on contact with water. However, the reaction rates of all alkali metals depend upon surface area of metal in contact with water, with small metal droplets giving explosive rates. Rubidium has also been reported to ignite spontaneously in air.

=== Compounds ===
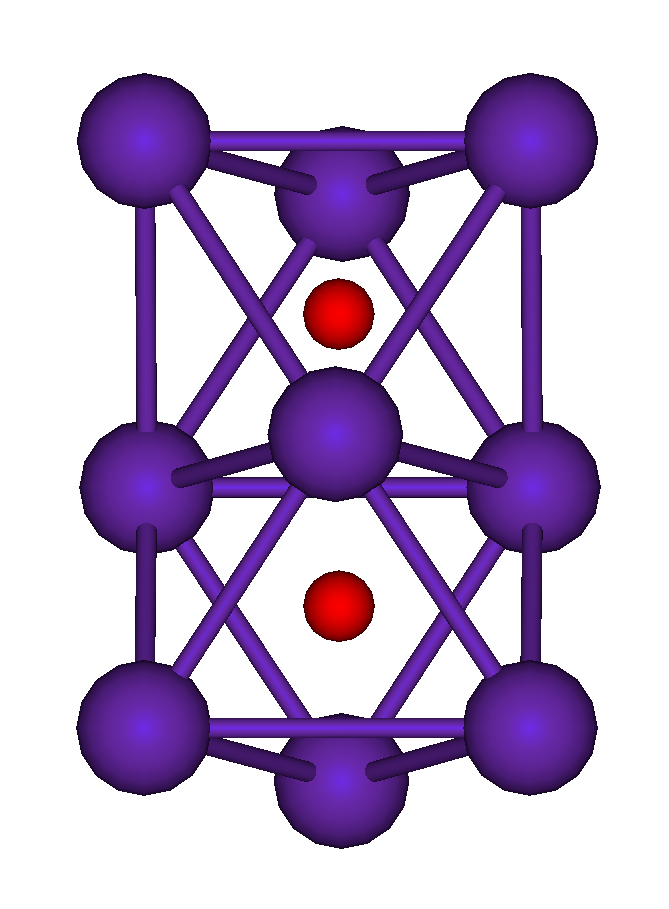
Rb_{9}O_{2} cluster

Rubidium chloride (RbCl) is probably the most used rubidium compound: among several other chlorides, it is used to induce living cells to take up DNA; it is also used as a biomarker, because in nature, it is found only in small quantities in living organisms and when present, replaces potassium. Other common rubidium compounds are the corrosive rubidium hydroxide (RbOH), the starting material for most rubidium-based chemical processes; rubidium carbonate (Rb_{2}CO_{3}), used in some optical glasses, and rubidium copper sulfate, Rb_{2}SO_{4}·CuSO_{4}·6H_{2}O. Rubidium silver iodide (RbAg_{4}I_{5}) has the highest room temperature conductivity of any known ionic crystal, a property exploited in thin film batteries and other applications.

Rubidium forms a number of oxides when exposed to air, including rubidium monoxide (Rb_{2}O), Rb_{6}O, and Rb_{9}O_{2}; rubidium in excess oxygen gives the superoxide RbO_{2}. Rubidium forms salts with halogens, producing rubidium fluoride, rubidium chloride, rubidium bromide, and rubidium iodide.

=== Isotopes ===
Rubidium in the Earth's crust is composed of two isotopes: the stable ^{85}Rb (72.2%) and the radioactive ^{87}Rb (27.8%). Natural rubidium is radioactive, with specific activity of about 670 Bq/g, enough to significantly expose a photographic film in 110 days. Thirty additional rubidium isotopes have been synthesized with half-lives of less than 3 months; most are highly radioactive and have few uses.

Rubidium-87 has a half-life of 48.8×10^{9} years, which is more than three times the age of the universe of (13.799±0.021)×10^{9} years, making it a primordial nuclide. It readily substitutes for potassium in minerals, and is therefore fairly widespread. Rb has been used extensively in dating rocks; ^{87}Rb beta decays to stable ^{87}Sr. During fractional crystallization, Sr tends to concentrate in plagioclase, leaving Rb in the liquid phase. Hence, the Rb/Sr ratio in residual magma may increase over time, and the progressing differentiation results in rocks with elevated Rb/Sr ratios. The highest ratios (10 or more) occur in pegmatites. If the initial amount of Sr is known or can be extrapolated, then the age can be determined by measurement of the Rb and Sr concentrations and of the ^{87}Sr/^{86}Sr ratio. The dates indicate the true age of the minerals only if the rocks have not been subsequently altered (see rubidium–strontium dating).

Rubidium-82, one of the element's non-natural isotopes, is produced by electron-capture decay of strontium-82 with a half-life of 25.36 days. With a half-life of 76 seconds, rubidium-82 decays by positron emission to stable krypton-82.

== Occurrence ==
Rubidium is not abundant, being one of 56 elements that combined make up 0.05% of the Earth's crust; at roughly the 23rd most abundant element in the Earth's crust it is more abundant than zinc or copper. It occurs naturally in the minerals leucite, pollucite, carnallite, and zinnwaldite, which contain as much as 1% rubidium oxide. Lepidolite contains between 0.3% and 3.5% rubidium, and is the commercial source of the element. Some potassium minerals and potassium chlorides also contain the element in commercially significant quantities.

Seawater contains an average of 125 μg/L of rubidium compared to the much higher value for potassium of 408 mg/L and the much lower value of 0.3 μg/L for caesium. Rubidium is the 18th most abundant element in seawater.

Because of its large ionic radius, rubidium is one of the "incompatible elements". During magma crystallization, rubidium is concentrated together with its heavier analogue caesium in the liquid phase and crystallizes last. Therefore, the largest deposits of rubidium and caesium are zone pegmatite ore bodies formed by this enrichment process. Because rubidium substitutes for potassium in the crystallization of magma, the enrichment is far less effective than that of caesium. Zone pegmatite ore bodies containing mineable quantities of caesium as pollucite or the lithium minerals lepidolite are also a source for rubidium as a by-product.

Two notable sources of rubidium are the rich deposits of pollucite at Bernic Lake, Manitoba, Canada, and the rubicline ((Rb,K)AlSi_{3}O_{8} found as impurities in pollucite on the Italian island of Elba, with a rubidium content of 17.5%. Both of those deposits are also sources of caesium.

== Production ==
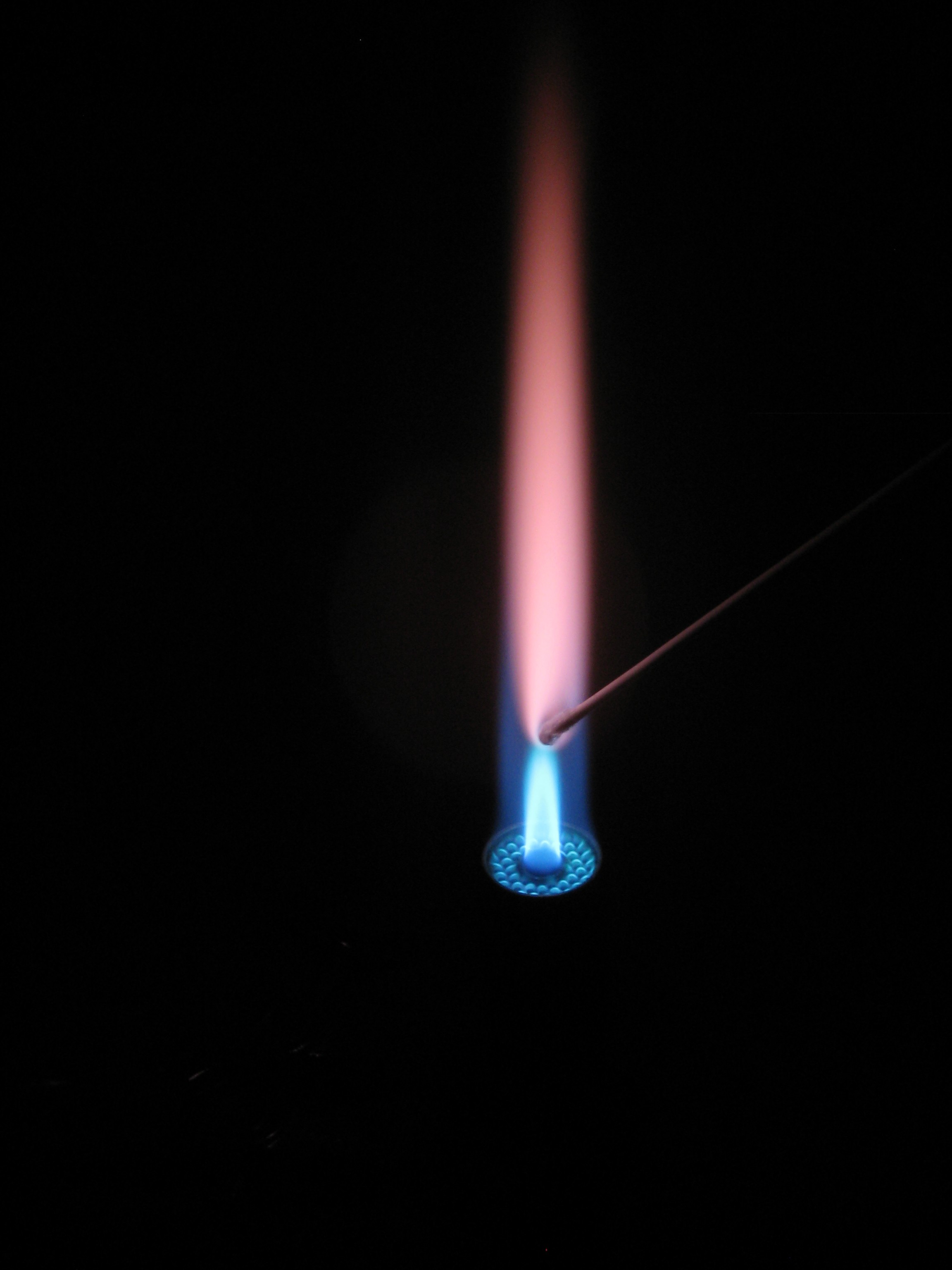
Flame test for rubidium

Although rubidium is more abundant in Earth's crust than caesium, the limited applications and the lack of a mineral rich in rubidium limits the production of rubidium compounds to 2 to 4 tonnes per year. Several methods are available for separating potassium, rubidium, and caesium. The fractional crystallization of a rubidium and caesium alum (Cs,Rb)Al(SO_{4})_{2}·12H_{2}O yields after 30 subsequent steps pure rubidium alum. Two other methods are reported, the chlorostannate process and the ferrocyanide process.

For several years in the 1950s and 1960s, a by-product of potassium production called Alkarb was a main source for rubidium. Alkarb contained 21% rubidium, with the rest being potassium and a small amount of caesium. Today the largest producers of caesium produce rubidium as a by-product from pollucite.

== History ==
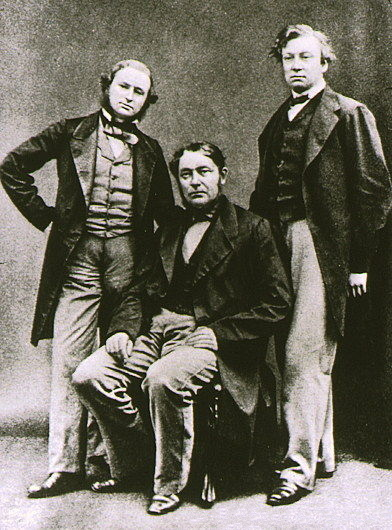
Gustav Kirchhoff (left) and Robert Bunsen (center) discovered rubidium by spectroscopy. (Henry Enfield Roscoe is on the right.)

Rubidium was discovered in 1861 by Robert Bunsen and Gustav Kirchhoff, in Heidelberg, Germany, in the mineral lepidolite through flame spectroscopy. Because of the bright red lines in its emission spectrum, they chose a name derived from the Latin word rubidus, meaning "deep red".

Rubidium is a minor component in lepidolite. Kirchhoff and Bunsen processed 150 kg of a lepidolite containing only 0.24% rubidium monoxide (Rb_{2}O). Both potassium and rubidium form insoluble salts with chloroplatinic acid, but those salts show a slight difference in solubility in hot water. Therefore, the less soluble rubidium hexachloroplatinate (Rb_{2}PtCl_{6}) could be obtained by fractional crystallization. After reduction of the hexachloroplatinate with hydrogen, the process yielded 0.51 grams of rubidium chloride (RbCl) for further studies. Bunsen and Kirchhoff began their first large-scale isolation of caesium and rubidium compounds with 44,000 litres (12,000 US gal) of mineral water, which yielded 7.3 grams of caesium chloride and 9.2 grams of rubidium chloride. Rubidium was the second element, shortly after caesium, to be discovered by spectroscopy, just one year after the invention of the spectroscope by Bunsen and Kirchhoff.

The two scientists used the rubidium chloride to estimate that the atomic weight of the new element was 85.36 (the currently accepted value is 85.47). They tried to generate elemental rubidium by electrolysis of molten rubidium chloride, but instead of a metal, they obtained a blue homogeneous substance, which "neither under the naked eye nor under the microscope showed the slightest trace of metallic substance". They presumed that it was a subchloride (Rb_{2}Cl); however, the product was probably a colloidal mixture of the metal and rubidium chloride. In a second attempt to produce metallic rubidium, Bunsen was able to reduce rubidium by heating charred rubidium tartrate. Although the distilled rubidium was pyrophoric, they were able to determine the density and the melting point. The quality of this research in the 1860s can be appraised by the fact that their determined density differs by less than 0.1 g/cm^{3} and the melting point by less than 1 °C from the presently accepted values.

The slight radioactivity of rubidium was discovered in 1908, but that was before the theory of isotopes was established in 1910, and the low level of activity (half-life greater than 10^{10} years) made interpretation complicated. The now proven decay of ^{87}Rb to stable ^{87}Sr through beta decay was still under discussion in the late 1940s.

Rubidium had minimal industrial value before the 1920s. Since then, the most important use of rubidium is research and development, primarily in chemical and electronic applications. In 1995, rubidium-87 was used to produce a Bose–Einstein condensate, for which the discoverers, Eric Allin Cornell, Carl Edwin Wieman and Wolfgang Ketterle, won the 2001 Nobel Prize in Physics.

== Applications ==
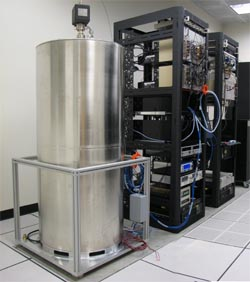
A rubidium fountain atomic clock at the United States Naval Observatory

Rubidium has also been considered for use in a thermoelectric generator using the magnetohydrodynamic principle, whereby hot rubidium ions are passed through a magnetic field. These conduct electricity and act like an armature of a generator, thereby generating an electric current. Rubidium, particularly vaporized ^{87}Rb, is one of the most commonly used atomic species employed for laser cooling and Bose–Einstein condensation. Its desirable features for this application include the ready availability of inexpensive diode laser light at the relevant wavelength and the moderate temperatures required to obtain substantial vapor pressures. For cold-atom applications requiring tunable interactions, ^{85}Rb is preferred for its rich Feshbach spectrum.

Rubidium has been used for polarizing ^{3}He, producing volumes of magnetized ^{3}He gas, with the nuclear spins aligned rather than random. Rubidium vapor is optically pumped by a laser, and the polarized Rb polarizes ^{3}He through the hyperfine interaction. Such spin-polarized ^{3}He cells are useful for neutron polarization measurements and for producing polarized neutron beams for other purposes.

The resonant element in atomic clocks utilizes the hyperfine structure of rubidium's energy levels, and rubidium is useful for high-precision timing. It is used as the main component of secondary frequency references (rubidium oscillators) in cell site transmitters and other electronic transmitting, networking, and test equipment. These rubidium standards are often used with GNSS to produce a "primary frequency standard" that has greater accuracy and is less expensive than caesium standards. Such rubidium standards are often mass-produced for the telecommunications industry.

Other potential or current uses of rubidium include a working fluid in vapor turbines, as a getter in vacuum tubes, and as a photocell component. Rubidium is also used as an ingredient in special types of glass, in the production of superoxide by burning in oxygen, in the study of potassium ion channels in biology, and as the vapor in atomic magnetometers. In particular, ^{87}Rb is used with other alkali metals in the development of spin-exchange relaxation-free (SERF) magnetometers.

Rubidium-82 is used for positron emission tomography. Rubidium is very similar to potassium, and tissue with high potassium content will also accumulate the radioactive rubidium. One of the main uses is myocardial perfusion imaging. As a result of changes in the blood–brain barrier in brain tumors, rubidium collects more in brain tumors than normal brain tissue, allowing the use of radioisotope rubidium-82 in nuclear medicine to locate and image brain tumors. Rubidium-82 has a very short half-life of 76 seconds, and the production from decay of strontium-82 must be done close to the patient.

Rubidium was tested for the influence on bipolar disorder and depression. Dialysis patients suffering from depression show a depletion in rubidium, and therefore a supplementation may help during depression. In some tests the rubidium was administered as rubidium chloride with up to 720 mg per day for 60 days.

Rubidium
Hazards
- GHS labelling
Pictograms	(GHS02: Flammable) (GHS05: Corrosive)
Signal word	Danger
Hazard statements	H260, H314
Precautionary statements	P223, P231+P232, P280, P305+P351+P338, P370+P378, P422
NFPA 704 (fire diamond)	3 4 2 W

== Precautions and biological effects ==
Rubidium reacts violently with water and can cause fires. To ensure safety and purity, this metal is usually kept under dry mineral oil or sealed in glass ampoules in an inert atmosphere. Rubidium forms peroxides on exposure even to a small amount of air diffused into the oil, and storage is subject to similar precautions as the storage of metallic potassium.

Rubidium, like sodium and potassium, almost always has +1 oxidation state when dissolved in water. The human body tends to treat Rb^{+} ions as if they were potassium ions, and therefore concentrates rubidium in the body's intracellular fluid (i.e., inside cells). The ions are not particularly toxic; a 70 kg person contains on average 0.36 g of rubidium (0.26% of their average 140 g of potassium), and an increase in this value by 50 to 100 times did not show negative effects in test persons. The biological half-life of rubidium in humans measures 31–46 days. Although a partial substitution of potassium by rubidium is possible, when more than 50% of the potassium in the muscle tissue of rats was replaced with rubidium, the rats died.
