= Rubidium-82 =

Isotope of rubidium

General
- Symbol: ^{82}Rb
- Names: rubidium-82
- Protons (Z): 37
- Neutrons (N): 45

Nuclide data
- Half-life (t_{1/2}): 1.2575 min
- Isotope mass: 81.9182098 Da
- Spin: +1
- Parent isotopes: ^{82}Sr
- Decay products: ^{82}Kr

Decay modes
- Decay mode: Decay energy (MeV)

Rubidium-82 (^{82}Rb) is a radioactive isotope of rubidium. ^{82}Rb is widely used in myocardial perfusion imaging. This isotope undergoes rapid uptake by myocardiocytes, which makes it a valuable tool for identifying myocardial ischemia in Positron Emission Tomography (PET) imaging. ^{82}Rb is used in the pharmaceutical industry and is marketed as rubidium-82 chloride under the trade names RUBY-FILL and CardioGen-82.

== History ==
In 1953, it was discovered that rubidium carried a biological activity that was comparable to potassium. In 1959, preclinical trials showed in dogs that myocardial uptake of this radionuclide was directly proportional to myocardial blood flow. In 1979, Yano et al. compared several ion-exchange columns to be used in an automated ^{82}Sr/^{82}Rb generator for clinical testing. Around 1980, pre-clinical trials began using ^{82}Rb in PET. In 1982, Selwyn et al. examined the relation between myocardial perfusion and rubidium-82 uptake during acute ischemia in six dogs after coronary stenosis and in five volunteers and five patients with coronary artery disease. Myocardial tomograms, recorded at rest and after exercise in the volunteers showed homogeneous uptake in reproducible and repeatable scans. Rubidium-82 has shown considerable accuracy, comparable to that of ^{99m}Tc-SPECT. In 1989, the FDA approved the ^{82}Rb/^{82}Sr generator for commercial use in the U.S. With increased ^{82}Sr production capabilities, the use of ^{82}Rb has increased over the last 10 years and is now approved by several health authorities worldwide.

== Production ==
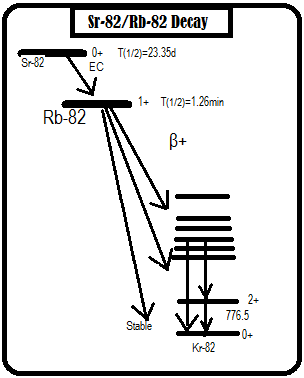
The decay of Rubidium-82, which undergoes positron emission.

Rubidium-82 is produced by electron capture of its parent nucleus, strontium-82. The generator contains accelerator-produced ^{82}Sr adsorbed on stannic oxide in a lead-shielded column and provides a means for obtaining sterile nonpyrogenic solutions of rubidium chloride (halide salt form capable of injection). The amount (millicuries) of ^{82}Rb obtained in each elution will depend on the potency of the generator. When eluted at a rate of 50 mL/minute, each generator eluate at the end of elution should not contain more than 0.02 microcuries of strontium ^{82}Sr and not more than 0.2 microcuries of ^{85}Sr per millicurie of ^{82}RbCl injection, and not more than 1 microgram of tin per mL of eluate.

== Pharmacology ==
=== Mechanism of action ===
^{82}Rb has activity very similar to that of a potassium ion (K^{+}). Once in the myocardium, it is an active participant in the sodium-potassium exchange pump of cells. It is rapidly extracted by the myocardium proportional to blood flow. Its radioactivity is increased in viable myocardial cells reflecting cellular retention, while the tracer is cleared rapidly from necrotic or infarcted tissue.

=== Pharmacodynamics ===
When tested clinically, ^{82}Rb is seen in the myocardium within the first minute of intravenous injection. When the myocardium is affected with ischemia or infarction, they will be visualized between 2–7 minutes. These affected areas will be shown as photon deficient on the PET scan. ^{82}Rb passes through the entire body on the first pass of circulation and has visible uptake in organs such as the kidney, liver, spleen and lung. This is due to the high vascularity of those organs.

== Use in PET ==
Rubidium is rapidly extracted from the blood and is taken up by the myocardium in relation to myocardial perfusion, which requires energy for myocardial uptake through Na^{+}/K^{+}-ATPase similar to thallium-201. ^{82}Rb is capable of producing a clear perfusion image similar to single photon emission computed tomography(SPECT)-MPI because it is an extractable tracer. The short half-life requires rapid image acquisition shortly after tracer administration, which reduces total study time. The short half-life also allows for less radiation experienced by the patient. A standard visual perfusion imaging assessment is based on defining regional uptake relative to the maximum uptake in the myocardium. Importantly, ^{82}Rb PET also seems to provide prognostic value in patients who are obese and whose diagnosis remains uncertain after SPECT-MPI.

^{82}Rb myocardial blood flow quantification is expected to improve the detection of multivessel coronary heart disease. ^{82}Rb/PET is a valuable tool in ischemia identification. Myocardial Ischemia is an inadequate blood supply to the heart. ^{82}Rb/PET can be used to quantify the myocardial flow reserve in the ventricles which then allows the medical professional to make an accurate diagnosis and prognosis of the patient. Various vasoreactivity studies are made possible through ^{82}Rb/PET imaging due to its quantification of myocardial blood flow. It is possible to quantify stress in patients under the same reasoning. Recently it has been shown that neuroendocrine tumor metastasis can be imaged with ^{82}Rb due to its ability to quantify myocardial blood flow (MBF) during rest and pharmacological stress, commonly performed with adenosine.

=== Advantages ===
A comparison of SPECT and PET images from a 56-year-old woman with a history of obesity (BMI: 31.2 cm/kg2), hypertension, hyperlipemia, and type 2 diabetes complicated of retinopathy and kidney failure.

One of the main advantages of ^{82}Rb is its availability in nuclear medicine departments. This isotope is available after 10-minute elution of a ^{82}Sr column; this makes it possible to produce enough samples to inject about 10–15 patients a day. Another advantage of ^{82}Rb would be its high count density in myocardial tissue. ^{82}Rb/PET has shown greater uniformity and count density than ^{99m}Tc-SPECT when examining the myocardium. This results in higher interpretive confidence and greater accuracy. It allows for quantification of coronary flow reserve and myocardial blood flow. ^{82}Rb also has an advantage in that it has a very short half-life which results in much lower radiation exposure for the patient. This is especially important as the use of myocardial imaging increases in the medical field. When it comes to patients, ^{82}Rb is beneficial to use when the patient is obese or physically unable to perform a stress test. It also has side effects limited to minor irritation around the injection site.

=== Limitations ===
A serious limitation of ^{82}Rb would be its cost. Currently ^{99m}Tc costs on average $70 per dose, needing two doses; whereas ^{82}Rb costs about $250 a dose. Another limitation of this isotope is that it needs a dedicated PET/CT camera, and in places like Europe where a ^{82}Sr/^{82}Rb generator is still yet to be approved that can be hard to find.
