= Isotopes of strontium =

Isotopes of strontium (_{38}Sr)
Main isotopes			Decay	
Isotope	abundance	half-life (t_{1/2})	mode	product
^{82}Sr	synth	25.35 d	ε	^{82}Rb
^{83}Sr	synth	32.41 h	β^{+}	^{83}Rb
^{84}Sr	0.56%	stable		
^{85}Sr	synth	64.846 d	ε	^{85}Rb
^{86}Sr	9.86%	stable		
^{87}Sr	7%	stable		
^{88}Sr	82.6%	stable		
^{89}Sr	synth	50.56 d	β^{−}	^{89}Y
^{90}Sr	trace	28.91 y	β^{−}	^{90}Y

Standard atomic weight A_{r}°(Sr)
- 87.62±0.01; 87.62±0.01 (abridged)

The alkaline earth metal strontium (_{38}Sr) has four stable, naturally occurring isotopes: ^{84}Sr (0.56%), ^{86}Sr (9.86%), ^{87}Sr (7.0%) and ^{88}Sr (82.58%), giving it a standard atomic weight of 87.62.

Only ^{87}Sr is radiogenic; it is produced by decay from the radioactive alkali metal ^{87}Rb, which has a half-life of 4.97 × 10^{10} years (i.e. more than three times longer than the current age of the universe). Thus, there are two sources of ^{87}Sr in any material: primordial, formed during nucleosynthesis along with ^{84}Sr, ^{86}Sr and ^{88}Sr; and that formed by radioactive decay of ^{87}Rb. The ratio ^{87}Sr/^{86}Sr is the parameter typically reported in geologic investigations; ratios in minerals and rocks have values ranging from about 0.7 to greater than 4.0 (see rubidium–strontium dating). Because strontium has an electron configuration similar to that of calcium, it readily substitutes for calcium in minerals.

In addition to the four stable isotopes, thirty-two unstable isotopes of strontium are known to exist, ranging from ^{73}Sr to ^{108}Sr. Radioactive isotopes of strontium primarily decay into the neighbouring elements yttrium (^{89}Sr and heavier isotopes, via beta minus decay) and rubidium (^{85}Sr, ^{83}Sr and lighter isotopes, via positron emission or electron capture). The longest-lived of these isotopes, are ^{90}Sr with a half-life of 28.91 years, ^{85}Sr at 64.846 days, ^{89}Sr at 50.56 days, and ^{82}Sr at 25.35 days. All other strontium isotopes have half-lives shorter than 10 hours, most under 10 minutes.

Strontium-89 is an artificial radioisotope used in treatment of bone cancer; this application utilizes its chemical similarity to calcium, which allows it to substitute calcium in bone structures. In circumstances where cancer patients have widespread and painful bony metastases, the administration of ^{89}Sr results in the delivery of beta particles directly to the cancerous portions of the bone, where calcium turnover is greatest.

Strontium-90 is a by-product of nuclear fission, present in nuclear fallout. The 1986 Chernobyl nuclear accident contaminated a vast area with ^{90}Sr. It causes health problems, as it substitutes for calcium in bone, giving it a long lifetime in the body. Because it is a long-lived high-energy beta emitter, it is used in SNAP (Systems for Nuclear Auxiliary Power) devices. These devices hold promise for use in spacecraft, remote weather stations, navigational buoys, etc., where a lightweight, long-lived, nuclear-electric power source is required.

In 2020, researchers have found that mirror nuclides ^{73}Sr and ^{73}Br were found to not behave identically to each other as expected.

== List of isotopes ==
Nuclide (Note: ^{m}Sr – Excited nuclear isomer.)	Z	N	Isotopic mass (Da) (Note: ( ) – Uncertainty (1σ) is given in concise form in parentheses after the corresponding last digits.) (Note: # – Atomic mass marked #: value and uncertainty derived not from purely experimental data, but at least partly from trends from the Mass Surface (TMS).)	Discovery year	Half-life (Note: # – Values marked # are not purely derived from experimental data, but at least partly from trends of neighboring nuclides (TNN).)	Decay mode (Note: Modes of decay: EC: / Electron capture; IT: / Isomeric transition; n: / Neutron emission; p: / Proton emission)	Daughter isotope (Note: Bold italics symbol as daughter – Daughter product is nearly stable.) (Note: Bold symbol as daughter – Daughter product is stable.)	Spin and parity (Note: ( ) spin value – Indicates spin with weak assignment arguments.)	Natural abundance (mole fraction)	
Nuclide	Excitation energy			Discovery year	Half-life	Decay mode	Daughter isotope	Spin and parity	Normal proportion	Range of variation
^{73}Sr	38	35	72.96570(43)#	1993	25.3(14) ms	β^{+}, p (63%)	^{72}Kr	(5/2−)		
^{73}Sr	38	35	72.96570(43)#	1993	25.3(14) ms	β^{+} (37%)	^{73}Rb	(5/2−)		
^{74}Sr	38	36	73.95617(11)#	1995	27.6(26) ms	β^{+}	^{74}Rb	0+		
^{75}Sr	38	37	74.94995(24)	1991	85.2(23) ms	β^{+} (94.8%)	^{75}Rb	(3/2−)		
^{75}Sr	38	37	74.94995(24)	1991	85.2(23) ms	β^{+}, p (5.2%)	^{74}Kr	(3/2−)		
^{76}Sr	38	38	75.941763(37)	1990	7.89(7) s	β^{+}	^{76}Rb	0+		
^{76}Sr	38	38	75.941763(37)	1990	7.89(7) s	β^{+}, p (0.0034%)	^{75}Kr	0+		
^{77}Sr	38	39	76.9379455(85)	1976	9.0(2) s	β^{+} (99.92%)	^{77}Rb	5/2+		
^{77}Sr	38	39	76.9379455(85)	1976	9.0(2) s	β^{+}, p (0.08%)	^{76}Kr	5/2+		
^{78}Sr	38	40	77.9321800(80)	1982	156.1(27) s	β^{+}	^{78}Rb	0+		
^{79}Sr	38	41	78.9297047(80)	1972	2.25(10) min	β^{+}	^{79}Rb	3/2−		
^{80}Sr	38	42	79.9245175(37)	1961	106.3(15) min	β^{+}	^{80}Rb	0+		
^{81}Sr	38	43	80.9232114(34)	1952	22.3(4) min	β^{+}	^{81}Rb	1/2−		
^{81m1}Sr	79.23(4) keV			1982	390(50) ns	IT	^{81}Sr	(5/2)−		
^{81m2}Sr	89.05(7) keV			1981	6.4(5) μs			(7/2+)		
^{82}Sr	38	44	81.9183998(64)	1952	25.35(3) d	EC	^{82}Rb	0+		
^{83}Sr	38	45	82.9175544(73)	1952	32.41(3) h	β^{+}	^{83}Rb	7/2+		
^{83m}Sr	259.15(9) keV			1987	4.95(12) s	IT	^{83}Sr	1/2−		
^{84}Sr	38	46	83.9134191(13)	1936	Observationally Stable (Note: Believed to decay by β^{+}β^{+} to ^{84}Kr)			0+	0.0056(2)	
^{85}Sr	38	47	84.9129320(30)	1940	64.846(6) d	EC	^{85}Rb	9/2+		
^{85m}Sr	238.79(5) keV			1940	67.63(4) min	IT (86.6%)	^{85}Sr	1/2−		
^{85m}Sr	238.79(5) keV			1940	67.63(4) min	β^{+} (13.4%)	^{85}Rb	1/2−		
^{86}Sr	38	48	85.9092607247(56)	1924	Stable			0+	0.0986(20)	
^{86m}Sr	2956.09(12) keV			1971	455(7) ns	IT	^{86}Sr	8+		
^{87}Sr (Note: Used in rubidium–strontium dating)	38	49	86.9088774945(55)	1931	Stable			9/2+	0.0700(20)	
^{87m}Sr	388.5287(23) keV			1939	2.805(9) h	IT (99.70%)	^{87}Sr	1/2−		
^{87m}Sr	388.5287(23) keV			1939	2.805(9) h	EC (0.30%)	^{87}Rb	1/2−		
^{88}Sr (Note: Fission product)	38	50	87.905612253(6)	1923	Stable			0+	0.8258(35)	
^{89}Sr	38	51	88.907450808(98)	1937	50.563(25) d	β^{−}	^{89}Y	5/2+		
^{90}Sr	38	52	89.9077279(16)	1951	28.91(3) y	β^{−}	^{90}Y	0+		
^{91}Sr	38	53	90.9101959(59)	1943	9.65(6) h	β^{−}	^{91}Y	5/2+		
^{92}Sr	38	54	91.9110382(37)	1941	2.611(17) h	β^{−}	^{92}Y	0+		
^{93}Sr	38	55	92.9140243(81)	1959	7.43(3) min	β^{−}	^{93}Y	5/2+		
^{94}Sr	38	56	93.9153556(18)	1959	75.3(2) s	β^{−}	^{94}Y	0+		
^{95}Sr	38	57	94.9193583(62)	1961	23.90(14) s	β^{−}	^{95}Y	1/2+		
^{96}Sr	38	58	95.9217190(91)	1971	1.059(8) s	β^{−}	^{96}Y	0+		
^{97}Sr	38	59	96.9263756(36)	1978	432(4) ms	β^{−} (99.98%)	^{97}Y	1/2+		
^{97}Sr	38	59	96.9263756(36)	1978	432(4) ms	β^{−}, n (0.02%)	^{96}Y	1/2+		
^{97m1}Sr	308.13(11) keV			1983	175.2(21) ns	IT	^{97}Sr	7/2+		
^{97m2}Sr	830.83(23) keV			2005	513(5) ns	IT	^{97}Sr	(9/2+)		
^{98}Sr	38	60	97.9286926(35)	1971	653(2) ms	β^{−} (99.77%)	^{98}Y	0+		
^{98}Sr	38	60	97.9286926(35)	1971	653(2) ms	β^{−}, n (0.23%)	^{97}Y	0+		
^{99}Sr	38	61	98.9328836(51)	1975	269.2(10) ms	β^{−} (99.90%)	^{99}Y	3/2+		
^{99}Sr	38	61	98.9328836(51)	1975	269.2(10) ms	β^{−}, n (0.100%)	^{98}Y	3/2+		
^{100}Sr	38	62	99.9357833(74)	1978	202.1(17) ms	β^{−} (98.89%)	^{100}Y	0+		
^{100}Sr	38	62	99.9357833(74)	1978	202.1(17) ms	β^{−}, n (1.11%)	^{99}Y	0+		
^{100m}Sr	1618.72(20) keV			1995	122(9) ns	IT	^{100}Sr	(4−)		
^{101}Sr	38	63	100.9406063(91)	1983	113.7(17) ms	β^{−} (97.25%)	^{101}Y	(5/2−)		
^{101}Sr	38	63	100.9406063(91)	1983	113.7(17) ms	β^{−}, n (2.75%)	^{100}Y	(5/2−)		
^{102}Sr	38	64	101.944005(72)	1986	69(6) ms	β^{−} (94.5%)	^{102}Y	0+		
^{102}Sr	38	64	101.944005(72)	1986	69(6) ms	β^{−}, n (5.5%)	^{101}Y	0+		
^{103}Sr	38	65	102.94924(22)#	1997	53(10) ms	β^{−}	^{103}Y	5/2+#		
^{104}Sr	38	66	103.95302(32)#	1997	50.6(42) ms	β^{−}	^{104}Y	0+		
^{105}Sr	38	67	104.95900(54)#	1997	39(5) ms	β^{−}	^{105}Y	5/2+#		
^{106}Sr	38	68	105.96318(64)#	2010	21(8) ms	β^{−}	^{106}Y	0+		
^{107}Sr	38	69	106.96967(75)#	2010	25# ms [>400 ns]			1/2+#		
^{108}Sr	38	70		2021						
This table header & footer:

== See also ==
Daughter products other than strontium

- Isotopes of yttrium
- Isotopes of rubidium
- Isotopes of krypton
