= Rubidium chloride =

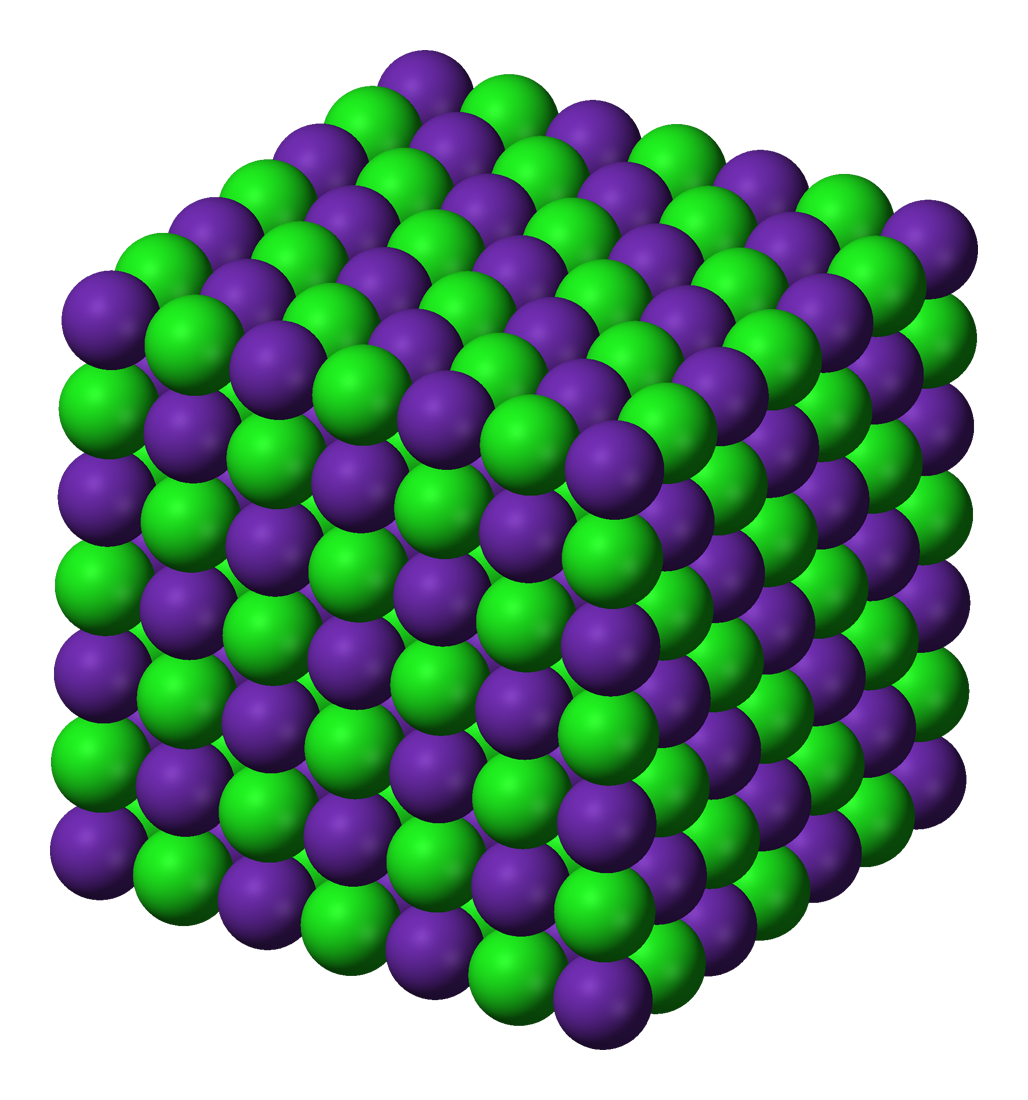
- Rubidium chloride's NaCl structure

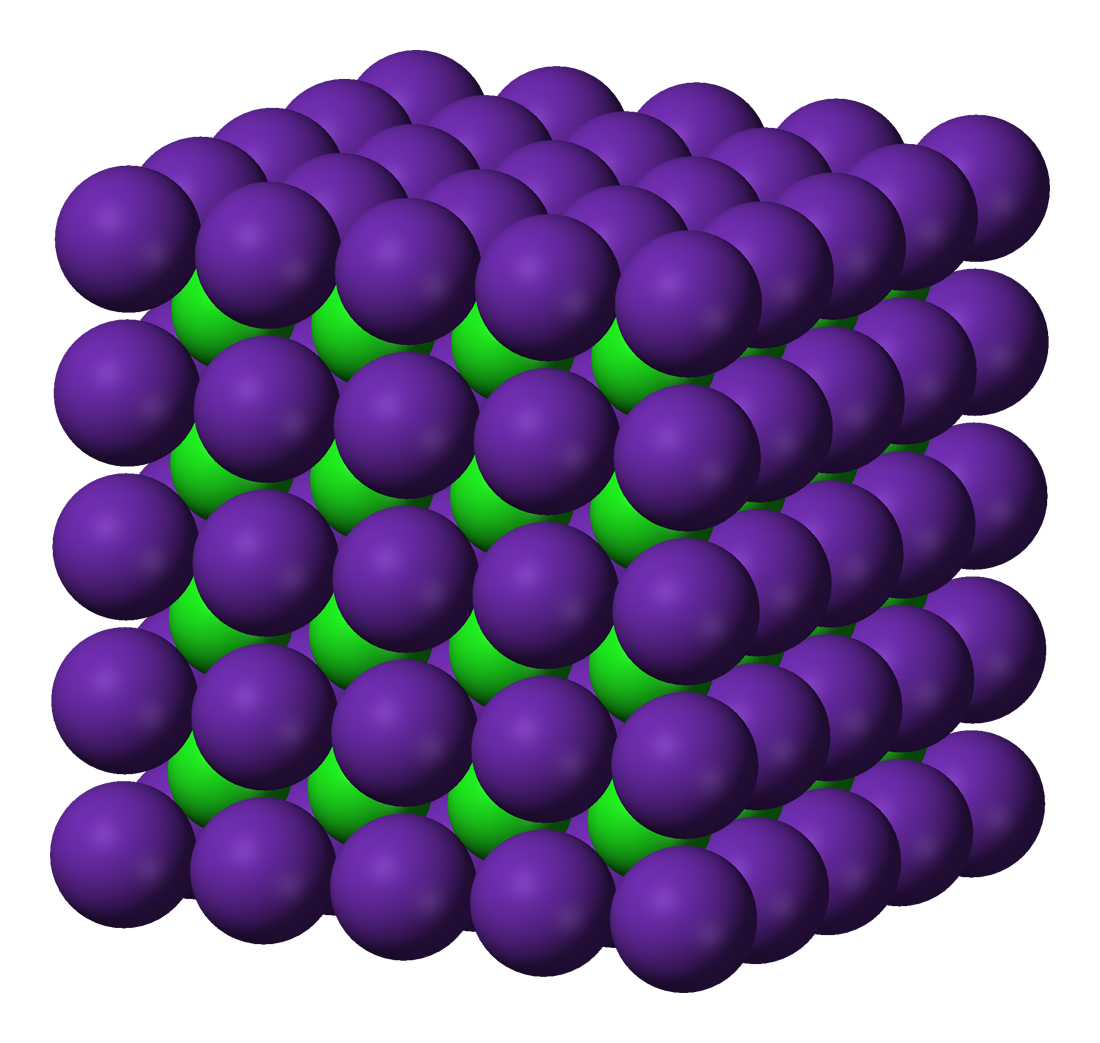
- Rubidium chloride's CsCl structure

Names
- Other names rubidium(I) chloride

Identifiers
CAS Number	7791-11-9
3D model (JSmol)	Interactive image
ChEBI	CHEBI:78672
ChemSpider	56434
ECHA InfoCard	100.029.310
PubChem CID	62683
RTECS number	VL8575000
UNII	N3SHC5273S
CompTox Dashboard (EPA)	DTXSID5064881
- InChI: InChI=1S/ClH.Rb/h1H;/q;+1/p-1 Key: FGDZQCVHDSGLHJ-UHFFFAOYSA-M; InChI=1/ClH.Rb/h1H;/q;+1/p-1
- SMILES: [Rb+].[Cl-]

Properties
Chemical formula	RbCl
Molar mass	120.921 g/mol
Appearance	white crystals hygroscopic
Density	2.80 g/cm^{3} (25 °C); 2.088 g/mL (750 °C)
Melting point	718 °C (1,324 °F; 991 K)
Boiling point	1,390 °C (2,530 °F; 1,660 K)
Solubility in water	77 g/100mL (0 °C); 91 g/100 mL (20 °C); 130 g/100 mL (100 °C)
Solubility in methanol	1.41 g/100 mL
Magnetic susceptibility (χ)	−46.0·10^{−6} cm^{3}/mol
Refractive index (n_{D})	1.5322

Thermochemistry
Heat capacity (C)	52.4 J K^{−1} mol^{−1}
Std molar entropy (S^{⦵}_{298})	95.9 J K^{−1} mol^{−1}
Std enthalpy of formation (Δ_{f}H^{⦵}_{298})	−435.14 kJ/mol

Hazards
NFPA 704 (fire diamond)	1 0 0
Flash point	Non-flammable
- Lethal dose or concentration (LD, LC)
LD_{50} (median dose)	4440 mg/kg (rat)
Safety data sheet (SDS)	Fisher Scientific

Related compounds
Other anions	Rubidium fluoride Rubidium bromide Rubidium iodide Rubidium astatide
Other cations	Lithium chloride Sodium chloride Potassium chloride Caesium chloride Francium chloride
- Except where otherwise noted, data are given for materials in their standard state (at 25 °C [77 °F], 100 kPa). verify (what is ?) Infobox references

Rubidium chloride is the chemical compound with the formula RbCl. This alkali metal halide salt is composed of rubidium and chlorine, and finds diverse uses ranging from electrochemistry to molecular biology.

== Structure ==
In its gas phase, RbCl is diatomic with a bond length estimated at 2.7868 Å. This distance increases to 3.285 Å for cubic RbCl, reflecting the higher coordination number of the ions in the solid phase.

Depending on conditions, solid RbCl exists in one of three arrangements or polymorphs as determined with holographic imaging:

=== Sodium chloride (octahedral 6:6) ===
The sodium chloride (NaCl) polymorph is most common. A cubic close-packed arrangement of chloride anions with rubidium cations filling the octahedral holes describes this polymorph. Both ions are six-coordinate in this arrangement. The lattice energy of this polymorph is only 3.2 kJ/mol less than the following structure's.

=== Caesium chloride (cubic 8:8) ===
At high temperature and pressure, RbCl adopts the caesium chloride (CsCl) structure (NaCl and KCl undergo the same structural change at high pressures). Here, the chloride ions form a simple cubic arrangement with chloride anions occupying the vertices of a cube surrounding a central Rb^{+}. This is RbCl's densest packing motif. Because a cube has eight vertices, both ions' coordination numbers equal eight. This is RbCl's highest possible coordination number. Therefore, according to the radius ratio rule, cations in this polymorph will reach their largest apparent radius because the anion-cation distances are greatest.

=== Sphalerite (tetrahedral 4:4) ===
The sphalerite polymorph of rubidium chloride has not been observed experimentally. This is consistent with the theory; the lattice energy is predicted to be nearly 40.0 kJ/mol smaller in magnitude than those of the preceding structures.

== Synthesis and reaction ==
The most common preparation of pure rubidium chloride involves the reaction of its hydroxide with hydrochloric acid, followed by recrystallization:

RbOH + HCl → RbCl + H_{2}O

Because RbCl is hygroscopic, it must be protected from atmospheric moisture, e.g. using a desiccator. RbCl is primarily used in laboratories. Therefore, numerous suppliers (see below) produce it in smaller quantities as needed. It is offered in a variety of forms for chemical and biomedical research.

Rubidium chloride reacts with sulfuric acid to give rubidium hydrogen sulfate.

== Radioactivity ==
Every 18 mg of rubidium chloride is equivalent to approximately one banana equivalent dose due to the large fraction (27.8%) of naturally occurring radioactive isotope rubidium-87.

== Uses ==
- Rubidium chloride is used as a gasoline additive to improve its octane number.
- Rubidium chloride has been shown to modify coupling between circadian oscillators via reduced photaic input to the suprachiasmatic nuclei. The outcome is a more equalized circadian rhythm, even for stressed organisms.
- Rubidium chloride is an excellent non-invasive biomarker. The compound dissolves well in water and can readily be taken up by organisms. Once broken in the body, Rb^{+} replaces K^{+} in tissues because they are from the same chemical group. An example of this is the use of a radioactive isotope to evaluate perfusion of heart muscle.
- Rubidium chloride transformation for competent cells is arguably the compound's most abundant use. Cells treated with a hypotonic solution containing RbCl expand. As a result, the expulsion of membrane proteins allows negatively charged DNA to bind.
- Rubidium chloride has shown antidepressant effects in experimental human studies, in doses ranging from 180 to 720 mg. It purportedly works by elevating dopamine and norepinephrine levels, resulting in a stimulating effect, which would be useful for anergic and apathetic depression.
