= Lithium chloride =

Chemical compound

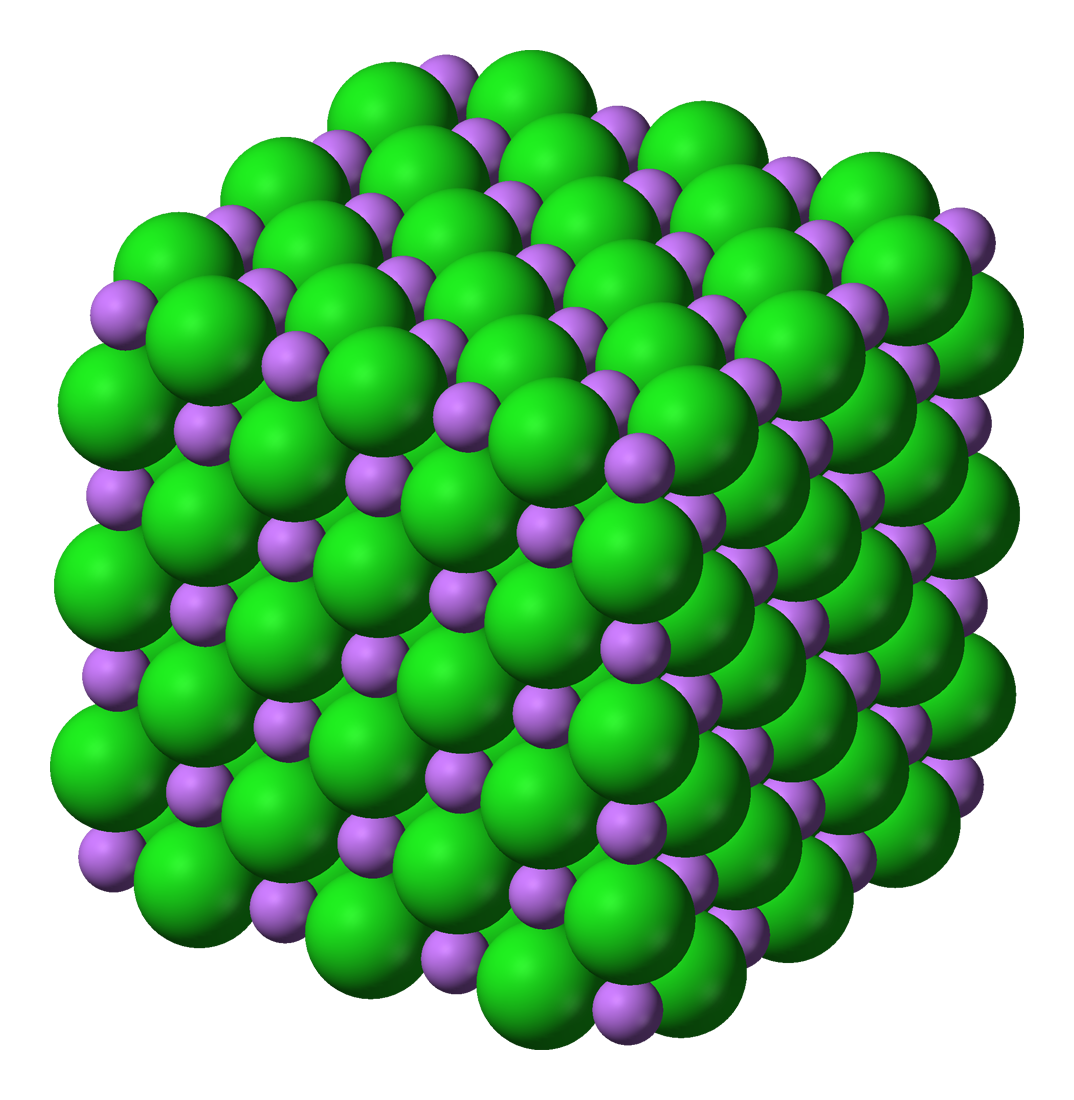
- Unit cell model of lithium chloride

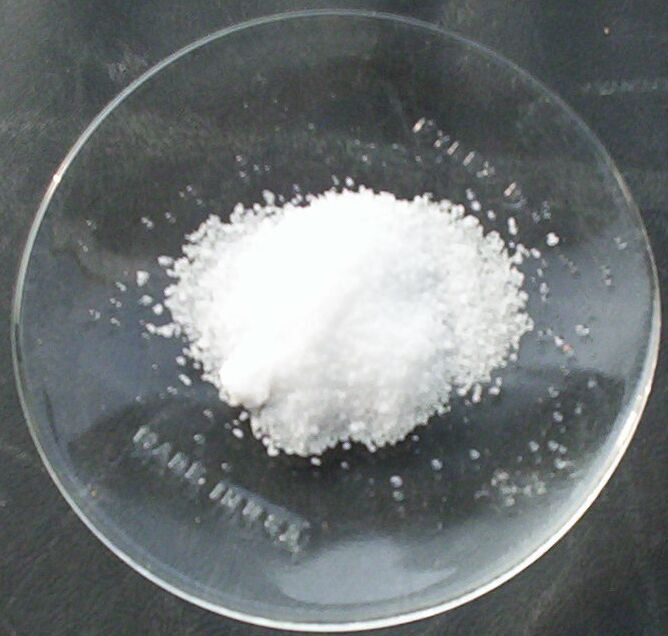
- Sample of lithium chloride in a watch glass

- __ Li^{+} __ Cl^{−}

Names
- Preferred IUPAC name Lithium chloride
- Systematic IUPAC name Lithium(1+) chloride

Identifiers
CAS Number	7447-41-8
3D model (JSmol)	Interactive image
ChEBI	CHEBI:48607
ChEMBL	ChEMBL69710
ChemSpider	22449
ECHA InfoCard	100.028.375
EC Number	231-212-3
MeSH	Lithium+chloride
PubChem CID	433294
RTECS number	OJ5950000
UNII	G4962QA067
UN number	2056
CompTox Dashboard (EPA)	DTXSID2025509
- InChI: InChI=1S/ClH.Li/h1H;/q;+1/p-1 Key: KWGKDLIKAYFUFQ-UHFFFAOYSA-M; InChI=1S/ClH.Li/h1H;/q;+1/p-1 Key: KWGKDLIKAYFUFQ-UHFFFAOYSA-M; InChI=1/ClH.Li/h1H;/q;+1/p-1 Key: KWGKDLIKAYFUFQ-REWHXWOFAB
- SMILES: [Li+].[Cl-]

Properties
Chemical formula	LiCl
Molar mass	42.39 g·mol^{−1}
Appearance	white solid hygroscopic, sharp
Density	2.068 g/cm^{3}
Melting point	605–614 °C (1,121–1,137 °F; 878–887 K)
Boiling point	1,382 °C (2,520 °F; 1,655 K)
Solubility in water	68.29 g/100 mL (0 °C); 74.48 g/100 mL (10 °C); 84.25 g/100 mL (25 °C); 88.7 g/100 mL (40 °C); 123.44 g/100 mL (100 °C)
Solubility	soluble in hydrazine, methylformamide, butanol, selenium(IV) oxychloride, 1-propanol
Solubility in methanol	45.2 g/100 g (0 °C); 43.8 g/100 g (20 °C); 42.36 g/100 g (25 °C); 44.6 g/100 g (60 °C)
Solubility in ethanol	14.42 g/100 g (0 °C); 24.28 g/100 g (20 °C); 25.1 g/100 g (30 °C); 23.46 g/100 g (60 °C)
Solubility in formic acid	26.6 g/100 g (18 °C); 27.5 g/100 g (25 °C)
Solubility in acetone	1.2 g/100 g (20 °C); 0.83 g/100 g (25 °C); 0.61 g/100 g (50 °C)
Solubility in liquid ammonia	0.54 g/100 g (−34 °C); 3.02 g/100 g (25 °C)
Vapor pressure	1 torr (785 °C); 10 torr (934 °C); 100 torr (1130 °C)
Magnetic susceptibility (χ)	−24.3·10^{−6} cm^{3}/mol
Refractive index (n_{D})	1.662 (24 °C)
Viscosity	0.87 cP (807 °C)

Structure
Coordination geometry	Octahedral
Molecular shape	Linear (gas)
Dipole moment	7.13 D (gas)

Thermochemistry
Heat capacity (C)	48.03 J/mol·K
Std molar entropy (S^{⦵}_{298})	59.31 J/mol·K
Std enthalpy of formation (Δ_{f}H^{⦵}_{298})	−408.27 kJ/mol
Gibbs free energy (Δ_{f}G^{⦵})	−384 kJ/mol

Pharmacology
ATC code	V04CX11 (WHO)

Hazards
- GHS labelling
Pictograms	(GHS07: Exclamation mark)
Signal word	Warning
Hazard statements	H302, H315, H319, H335
Precautionary statements	P261, P305+P351+P338
NFPA 704 (fire diamond)	2 0 0
Flash point	Non-flammable
- Lethal dose or concentration (LD, LC)
LD_{50} (median dose)	526 mg/kg (oral, rat)
Safety data sheet (SDS)	ICSC 0711

Related compounds
Other anions	Lithium fluoride Lithium bromide Lithium iodide Lithium astatide
Other cations	Sodium chloride Potassium chloride Rubidium chloride Caesium chloride Francium chloride

Supplementary data page
- Lithium chloride (data page)
- Except where otherwise noted, data are given for materials in their standard state (at 25 °C [77 °F], 100 kPa). verify (what is ?) Infobox references

Lithium chloride is a chemical compound with the formula LiCl. The salt is a typical ionic compound (with certain covalent characteristics), although the small size of the Li^{+} ion gives rise to properties not seen for other alkali metal chlorides, such as extraordinary solubility in polar solvents (83.05 g/100 mL of water at 20 °C) and its hygroscopic properties.

== Chemical properties ==
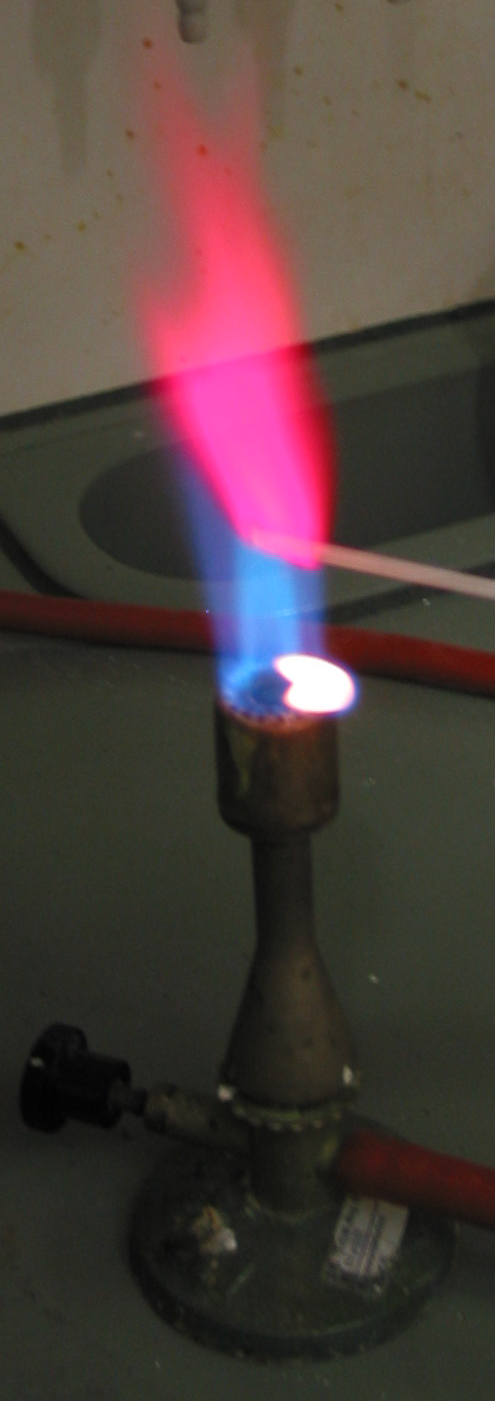
Color produced when lithium chloride is heated

The salt forms crystalline hydrates, unlike the other alkali metal chlorides. Mono-, tri-, and pentahydrates are known. The anhydrous salt can be regenerated by heating the hydrates. LiCl also absorbs up to four equivalents of ammonia/mol. As with any other ionic chloride, solutions of lithium chloride can serve as a source of chloride ion, e.g., forming a precipitate upon treatment with silver nitrate:

LiCl + AgNO_{3} → AgCl + LiNO_{3}

== Preparation ==
Lithium chloride is produced by treatment of lithium carbonate with hydrochloric acid. Anhydrous LiCl is prepared from the hydrate by heating in a stream of hydrogen chloride.

== Uses ==
=== Commercial applications ===
Lithium chloride is mainly used for the production of lithium metal by electrolysis of a LiCl/KCl melt at 450 °C (842 °F). LiCl is also used as a brazing flux for aluminium in automobile parts. It is used as a desiccant for drying air streams. In more specialized applications, lithium chloride finds some use in organic synthesis, e.g., as an additive in the Stille reaction. Also, in biochemical applications, it can be used to precipitate RNA from cellular extracts.

Lithium chloride is also used as a flame colorant to produce dark red flames.

=== Niche uses ===
Lithium chloride is used as a relative humidity standard in the calibration of hygrometers. At 25 °C (77 °F) a saturated solution (45.8%) of the salt will yield an equilibrium relative humidity of 11.30%. Additionally, lithium chloride can be used as a hygrometer. This deliquescent salt forms a self-solution when exposed to air. The equilibrium LiCl concentration in the resulting solution is directly related to the relative humidity of the air. The percent relative humidity at 25 °C (77 °F) can be estimated, with minimal error in the range 10–30 °C (50–86 °F), from the following first-order equation: RH=107.93-2.11C, where C is solution LiCl concentration, percent by mass.

Molten LiCl is used for the preparation of carbon nanotubes, graphene and lithium niobate.

Lithium chloride has been shown to have strong acaricidal properties, being effective against Varroa destructor in populations of honey bees.

Lithium chloride is used as an aversive agent in lab animals to study conditioned place preference and aversion.

== Precautions ==
Lithium salts affect the central nervous system in a variety of ways. While the citrate, carbonate, and orotate salts are currently used to treat bipolar disorder, other lithium salts including the chloride were used in the past. For a short time in the 1940s lithium chloride was manufactured as a salt substitute for people with hypertension, but this was prohibited after the toxic effects of the compound (tremors, fatigue, nausea) were recognized. It was, however, noted by J. H. Talbott that many symptoms attributed to lithium chloride toxicity may have also been attributable to sodium chloride deficiency, to the diuretics often administered to patients who were given lithium chloride, or to the patients' underlying conditions.

== See also ==
- Lithium chloride (data page)
- Solubility table
