= Radon compounds =

Any chemical compound having at least one radon atom in its structure

Radon compounds are chemical compounds formed by the element radon (Rn). Radon is a noble gas, i.e. a zero-valence element, and is chemically not very reactive. The 3.8-day half-life of radon-222 makes it useful in physical sciences as a natural tracer. Because radon is a gas under normal circumstances, and its decay-chain parents are not, it can readily be extracted from them for research.

It is inert to most common chemical reactions, such as combustion, because its outer valence shell contains eight electrons. This produces a stable, minimum energy configuration in which the outer electrons are tightly bound. Its first ionization energy—the minimum energy required to extract one electron from it—is 1037 kJ/mol. In accordance with periodic trends, radon has a lower electronegativity than the element one period before it, xenon, and is therefore more reactive. Early studies concluded that the stability of radon hydrate should be of the same order as that of the hydrates of chlorine (Cl_{2}) or sulfur dioxide (SO_{2}), and significantly higher than the stability of the hydrate of hydrogen sulfide (H_{2}S).

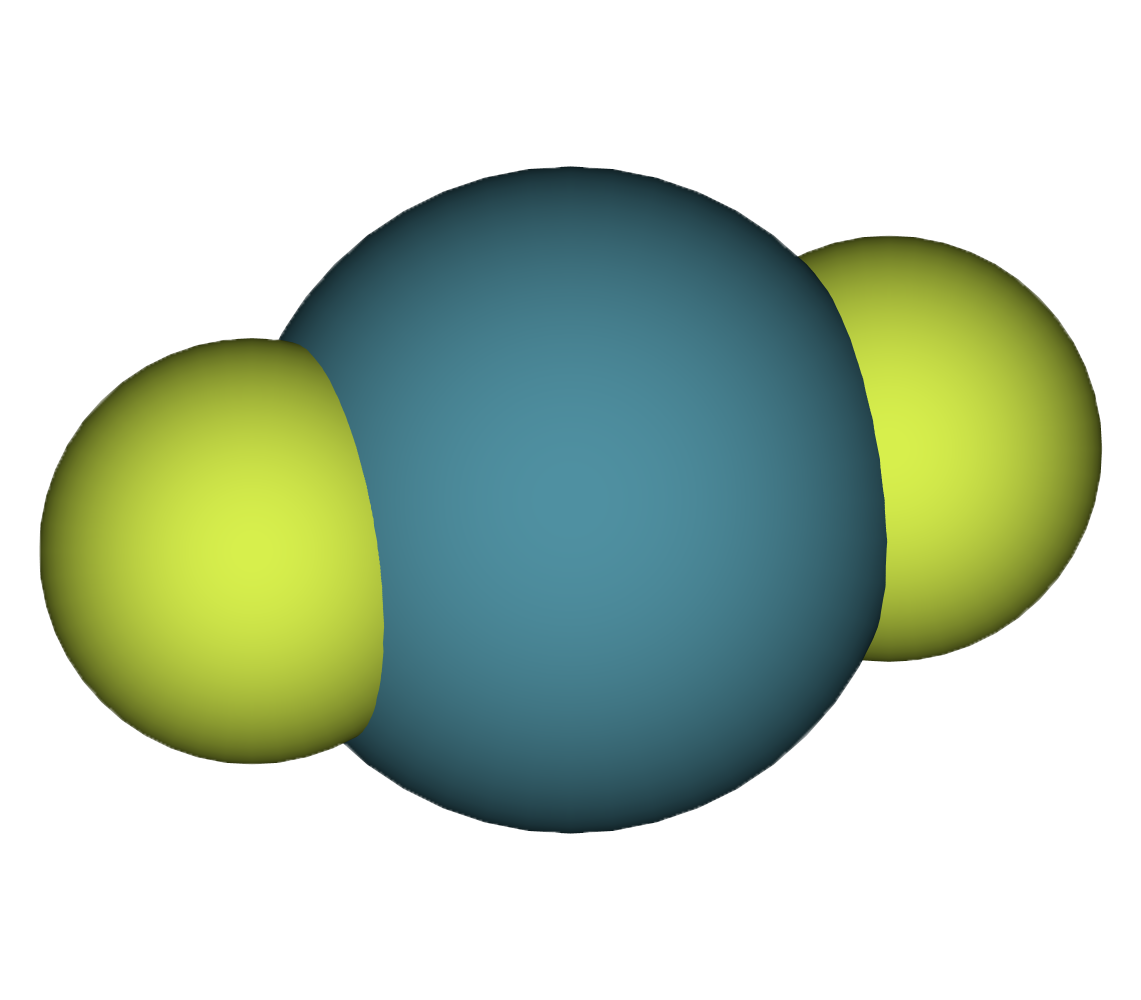
Structure of radon difluoride

Because of its cost and radioactivity, experimental chemical research is seldom performed with radon, and as a result there are very few reported compounds of radon, all being either fluorides or oxides. Radon can be oxidized by powerful oxidizing agents such as fluorine, thus forming radon difluoride (RnF_{2}). It decomposes back to its elements at a temperature of above 523 K (250 °C; 482 °F), and is reduced by water to radon gas and hydrogen fluoride: it may also be reduced back to its elements by hydrogen gas. It has a low volatility and was thought to be RnF_{2}. Because of the short half-life of radon and the radioactivity of its compounds, it has not been possible to study the compound in any detail. Theoretical studies on this molecule predict that it should have a Rn–F bond distance of 2.08 ångström (Å), and that the compound is thermodynamically more stable and less volatile than its lighter counterpart xenon difluoride (XeF_{2}). The octahedral molecule RnF_{6} was predicted to have an even lower enthalpy of formation than the difluoride. The [RnF]^{+} ion is believed to form by the following reaction:

Rn (g) + 2 [O_{2}]^{+}[SbF_{6}]^{−} (s) → [RnF]^{+}[Sb_{2}F_{11}]^{−} (s) + 2 O_{2} (g)

For this reason, antimony pentafluoride together with chlorine trifluoride and N_{2}F_{2}Sb_{2}F_{11} have been considered for radon gas removal in uranium mines due to the formation of radon–fluorine compounds. Radon compounds can be formed by the decay of radium in radium halides, a reaction that has been used to reduce the amount of radon that escapes from targets during irradiation. Additionally, salts of the [RnF]^{+} cation with the anions SbF^{−}_{6}, TaF^{−}_{6}, and BiF^{−}_{6} are known. Radon is also oxidised by dioxygen difluoride to RnF_{2} at 173 K (−100 °C; −148 °F).

Radon oxides are among the few other reported compounds of radon; only the trioxide (RnO_{3}) has been confirmed. The higher fluorides RnF_{4} and RnF_{6} have been claimed to exist and are calculated to be stable, but their identification is unclear. They may have been observed in experiments where unknown radon-containing products distilled together with xenon hexafluoride: these may have been RnF_{4}, RnF_{6}, or both. Trace-scale heating of radon with xenon, fluorine, bromine pentafluoride, and either sodium fluoride or nickel fluoride was claimed to produce a higher fluoride as well which hydrolysed to form RnO_{3}. While it has been suggested that these claims were really due to radon precipitating out as the solid complex [RnF]^{+}_{2}[NiF_{6}]^{2−}, the fact that radon coprecipitates from aqueous solution with CsXeO_{3}F has been taken as confirmation that RnO_{3} was formed, which has been supported by further studies of the hydrolysed solution. That [RnO_{3}F]^{−} did not form in other experiments may have been due to the high concentration of fluoride used. Electromigration studies also suggest the presence of cationic [HRnO_{3}]^{+} and anionic [HRnO_{4}]^{−} forms of radon in weakly acidic aqueous solution (pH > 5), the procedure having previously been validated by examination of the homologous xenon trioxide.

The decay technique has also been used. Avrorin et al. reported in 1982 that ^{212}Fr compounds cocrystallised with their caesium analogues appeared to retain chemically bound radon after electron capture; analogies with xenon suggested the formation of RnO_{3}, but this could not be confirmed.

It is likely that the difficulty in identifying higher fluorides of radon stems from radon being kinetically hindered from being oxidised beyond the divalent state because of the strong ionicity of radon difluoride (RnF_{2}) and the high positive charge on radon in RnF^{+}; spatial separation of RnF_{2} molecules may be necessary to clearly identify higher fluorides of radon, of which RnF_{4} is expected to be more stable than RnF_{6} due to spin–orbit splitting of the 6p shell of radon (Rn^{IV} would have a closed-shell 6s^{2}6p^{2}_{1/2} configuration). Therefore, while RnF_{4} should have a similar stability to xenon tetrafluoride (XeF_{4}), RnF_{6} would likely be much less stable than xenon hexafluoride (XeF_{6}): radon hexafluoride would also probably be a regular octahedral molecule, unlike the distorted octahedral structure of XeF_{6}, because of the inert-pair effect. Because radon is quite electropositive for a noble gas, it is possible that radon fluorides actually take on highly fluorine-bridged structures and are not volatile. Extrapolation down the noble gas group would suggest also the possible existence of RnO, RnO_{2}, and RnOF_{4}, as well as the first chemically stable noble gas chlorides RnCl_{2} and RnCl_{4}, but none of these have yet been found.

Radon carbonyl (RnCO) has been predicted to be stable and to have a linear molecular geometry. The molecules Rn_{2} and RnXe were found to be significantly stabilized by spin-orbit coupling. Radon caged inside a fullerene has been proposed as a drug for tumors. Despite the existence of Xe(VIII), no Rn(VIII) compounds have been claimed to exist; RnF_{8} should be highly unstable chemically (XeF_{8} is thermodynamically unstable). It is predicted that the most stable Rn(VIII) compound would be barium perradonate (Ba_{2}RnO_{6}), analogous to barium perxenate. The instability of Rn(VIII) is due to the relativistic stabilization of the 6s shell, also known as the inert-pair effect.

Radon reacts with the liquid halogen fluorides ClF, ClF_{3}, ClF_{5}, BrF_{3}, BrF_{5}, and IF_{7} to form RnF_{2}. In halogen fluoride solution, radon is nonvolatile and exists as the RnF^{+} and Rn^{2+} cations; addition of fluoride anions results in the formation of the complexes RnF^{−}_{3} and RnF^{2−}_{4}, paralleling the chemistry of beryllium(II) and aluminium(III). The standard electrode potential of the Rn^{2+}/Rn couple has been estimated as +2.0 V, although there is no evidence for the formation of stable radon ions or compounds in aqueous solution.

== See also ==
- Astatine compounds
- Xenon compounds
