= Binary acid =

Type of chemical compounds

Binary acids or hydracids are certain molecular compounds in which hydrogen is bonded with one other nonmetallic element. This distinguishes them from other types of acids with more than two constituent elements. The "binary" nature of binary acids is not determined by the number of atoms in a molecule, but rather how many elements it contains. For example, hydrosulfuric acid is cited as a binary acid, even though its formula is H_{2}S.

Examples of binary acids:

- HF
- H_{2}S
- HCl
- HBr
- HI
- HAt
- HN_{3}

For a given binary acid where element X is bonded to H, its strength depends on the solvation of the initial acid, the bond energy between H and X, the electron affinity energy of X, and the solvation energy of X. Observed trends in acidity correlate with bond energies, the weaker the H-X bond, the stronger the acid. For example, there is a weak bond between hydrogen and iodine in hydroiodic acid, making it a very strong acid.

In the simplest case, binary acid names are formed by combining the prefix hydro-, the name of the non-hydrogen nonmetallic element, the suffix -ic, and adding acid as a second word. However, there are exceptions to this rule, e.g. hydrazoic acid, HN_{3}

Binary acids are often contrasted with oxyacids, which are acids that contain oxygen and other compounds. However, other categories of acids remain in widespread use, including carboxylic acids. In addition, there are subcategories of binary acids, such as hydrohalic acids, which are binary acids where X is one of the halogens.

== See also ==
- Acid
- Oxyacid
