= Halide =

Chemical compound composed of a halogen atom and some other element

Radii in picometers of common halogen atoms (gray/black) and the corresponding halide anions (blue)

In chemistry, a halide (rarely halogenide) is a binary chemical compound, of which one part is a halogen atom and the other part is an element or radical that is less electronegative (or more electropositive) than the halogen, to make a fluoride, chloride, bromide, iodide, astatide, or theoretically tennesside compound. The alkali metals combine directly with halogens under appropriate conditions forming halides of the general formula, MX (X = F, Cl, Br or I). Many salts are halides; the hal- syllable in halide and halite reflects this correlation.

A halide ion is a halogen atom bearing a negative charge. The common halide anions are fluoride (F^{−}), chloride (Cl^{−}), bromide (Br^{−}), and iodide (I^{−}). Such ions are present in many ionic halide salts. Halide minerals contain halides. All these halide anions are colorless. Halides also form covalent bonds, examples being colorless TiF_{4}, colorless TiCl_{4}, orange TiBr_{4}, and brown TiI_{4}. The heavier members TiCl_{4}, TiBr_{4}, TiI_{4} can be distilled readily because they are molecular. The outlier is TiF_{4}, m.p. 284 °C, because it has a polymeric structure. Fluorides often differ from the heavier halides.

== Reactions ==
=== Redox ===
Halides cannot be reduced under the usual laboratory conditions, but they all can be oxidized to the parent halogens, which are diatomic. Especially for iodide and less so for the lighter halides, intermediates can be observed and isolated. Best characterized is triiodide. Many related species are known, including a host of polyiodides.

=== Protonation ===
Halides are conjugate bases of hydrogen halides, which are all gases. When the protonation is conducted in aqueous solution, hydrohalic acids are produced.

=== Reaction with silver ions ===
Halide salts such as KCl, KBr and KI are highly soluble in water to give colorless solutions. The solutions react readily with a solution of silver nitrate AgNO_{3}. These three halides form solid precipitates:

- AgCl: white
- AgBr: pale yellow
- AgI: yellow

Similar but slower reactions occur with alkyl halides in place of alkali metal halides, as described in the Beilstein test.

== Uses ==
Metal halides are used in high-intensity discharge lamps called metal halide lamps, such as those used in modern street lights. These are more energy-efficient than mercury-vapor lamps, and have much better colour rendition than orange high-pressure sodium lamps. Metal halide lamps are also commonly used in greenhouses or in rainy climates to supplement natural sunlight.

Silver halides are used in photographic films and papers. When the film is developed, the silver halides which have been exposed to light are reduced to metallic silver, forming an image.

Halides are also used in soldering flux, commonly as a Cl or Br equivalent (e.g ZnCl).

Synthetic organic chemistry often incorporates halogens into organohalide compounds.

== See also ==
- Salinity
- Organohalide
- Hydrogen halide
- Silver halide
