= Alice Leigh-Smith =

Croatian-born British Nuclear physicist (1907–1987)

Dr. Alice Leigh-Smith
- Born: Alice Prebil; 11 September 1907; Karlovac, Croatia
- Died: 3 December 1987 (aged 80); Mougins, France
- Known for: First British woman to receive a PhD in nuclear physics
- Spouse: Philip Leigh-Smith
- Children: Christopher Leigh Smith
- Scientific career
- Fields: Nuclear physics
- Workplaces: Curie Institute; University of Bern

Alice Leigh-Smith née Prebil (11 September 1907 – 3 December 1987) was a Croatian-born British nuclear physicist. She is best known for being the first woman in British history to receive a PhD in nuclear physics. Additionally, she is remembered for her pioneering research in cancer and for her attempts in the discovery of an elusive element, Element 85. She also spent a short period in the Paris laboratory of Marie Curie.

== Early life ==
Born on 11 September 1907 in Karlovac, Croatia, Alice Prebil was the daughter of Anton Prebil and his wife Draga née Luksic who were well-to-do landowners. After the end of World War I, they lost the land they had owned in Slovenia. Prebil completed her secondary school education in Yugoslavia in 1926 and went on to graduate in physics and mathematics at the University of Belgrade in 1928. Thereafter she moved to London and worked in the laboratory of Owen Richardson at King's College, London

Back in Paris, in 1932 Prebil met the British diplomat Philip Leigh-Smith (born 2 June 1892). He was the son of the Arctic explorer Benjamin Leigh-Smith, and the nephew of Barbara Bodichon, an influential mid-19th-century feminist and women's rights activist. They married on 8 April 1933 in Paris. Together they had one child, Christopher Leigh-Smith, who is now an entrepreneur based in Switzerland.

== Career ==
Shortly after the wedding, in May 1933 Leigh-Smith asked Marie Curie whether she could work in her laboratory at the Radium Institute in Paris. Curie invited her to spend the last term of the 1932–1933 academic year there but in fact she went on to spend a whole year at the laboratory, becoming a close companion of Irène Curie.

On leaving Paris, she returned to King's College, London, where on 20 November 1935, at the age of 28, she defended her thesis, becoming the first woman in Great Britain to receive a PhD in nuclear physics with Richardson as her mentor. Her paper, "The nuclear β-rays of radium D", published jointly with Richardson, appeared on 1 July 1937 in the Proceedings of the Royal Society of London.

Leigh-Smith was also involved in the use of radioactive substances as a treatment for cancer. From early 1936, she worked at the Royal London Hospital on a treatment based on a serum containing thorium C. The hospital's director, Thomas Lumsden, wrote to her husband asking whether she could continue conducting her research rather than moving abroad. He later discovered that she was pregnant and she soon gave birth to Christopher, their only child. As a result of Philip's diplomatic postings, the family then moved to Athens where Alice continued research on thorium C and other microbes until they moved to Chile in 1937. This was followed by further moves to Italy, Switzerland and other destinations. In his book Ladies in Diplomacy (1965), Philip Leigh-Smith reported on the success of the many receptions Alice organised for him as they moved from place to place.

From 1938 to 1940, during the Second World War, Alice Leigh-Smith was at the University of Bern in Switzerland, where she continued her work. In January 1943, the anticipation of results from her study regarding the treatment of cancer with radioactive substances was published in the London Times. However, no results are available for current analysis.

In 1942, Leigh-Smith and a Swiss chemist, Walter Minder jointly announced the discovery of element 85 (now called astatine). They proposed the name anglohelvetium for the new element, in order to honour both of their home countries—"anglo" for Leigh-Smith's England and "Helvetia" after the personification of Minder's country, Switzerland. This was Minder's second attempt at discovering the element. It was later proven that Walter Minder and Alice Leigh-Smith had not discovered element 85, after the failure of their results to be replicable.

In addition to her scientific interests, Alice Leigh-Smith was notable for her success in sports, particularly swimming for which she won several awards. She also enjoyed tennis, riding, skiing and ice skating.

Alice Leigh-Smith died in Mougins, France, and was buried in Opatija, Croatia, together with her husband.

== Legacy ==
A portion of Alice Leigh-Smith's private archives are in the possession of the Curie Institute for the Musée Curie. The records are accessible by appointment only.

== See also ==
- List of women associated with Marie Curie and Irène Joliot-Curie
