= Weightlifting at the 1980 Summer Paralympics – Men's -57 kg paraplegic =

Men's -57 kg paraplegic at the VI Paralympic Games
- Paralympic Weightlifting
- Competitors: 8 from 6 nations

Medalists
1st place, gold medalist(s)		Benny Nilsson	Sweden
2nd place, silver medalist(s)		Joseph Ponnier	France
3rd place, bronze medalist(s)		Zdzislaw Kolodziej	Poland

The Men's light-featherweight -57 kg paraplegic was an event in weightlifting at the 1980 Summer Paralympics, for paraplegic athletes. Sweden's Benny Nilsson recorded a lift of 175 kg to win gold.

== Results ==
Place	Name	Result (kg)
1	Benny Nilsson (SWE)	175
2	Joseph Ponnier (FRA)	175
3	Zdzislaw Kolodziej (POL)	155
4	Brian Stones (GBR)	150
5	Pietro Valsangiacomo (SUI)	147.5
6	Walter Minder (SUI)	127.5
7	Christopher Kipkemboi (KEN)	75
8	Jason Sichangi (KEN)	70

== See also ==
- Weightlifting at the 1980 Summer Paralympics
