= Hydrogen astatide =

Chemical compound

- Skeletal formula of hydrogen astatide with the explicit hydrogen and a measurement added

Ball-and-stick model of hydrogen astatide
Spacefill model of hydrogen astatide

Names
- IUPAC name Hydrogen astatide
- Systematic IUPAC name Astatane

Identifiers
CAS Number	13464-71-6
3D model (JSmol)	Interactive image
ChEBI	CHEBI:30418
ChemSpider	22432
Gmelin Reference	532398
PubChem CID	23996
CompTox Dashboard (EPA)	DTXSID10274755
- InChI: InChI=1S/AtH/h1H Key: PGLQOBBPBPTBQS-UHFFFAOYSA-N; InChI=1/AtH/h1H Key: PGLQOBBPBPTBQS-UHFFFAOYAG
- SMILES: [AtH]

Properties
Chemical formula	HAt
Molar mass	211 g·mol^{−1}
Boiling point	−3 °C (27 °F; 270 K) estimated
Solubility in water	Soluble
Conjugate acid	Astatonium
Conjugate base	Astatide

Related compounds
Other anions	Hydrogen fluoride Hydrogen chloride Hydrogen bromide Hydrogen iodide
Other cations	Sodium astatide
- Except where otherwise noted, data are given for materials in their standard state (at 25 °C [77 °F], 100 kPa). verify (what is ?) Infobox references

Hydrogen astatide, also known as astatine hydride, astatane, astatidohydrogen or hydroastatic acid, is a chemical compound with the chemical formula HAt, consisting of an astatine atom covalently bonded to a hydrogen atom. It thus is a hydrogen halide.

This chemical compound can dissolve in water to form hydroastatic acid, which exhibits properties very similar to the other five binary acids, and is in fact the strongest among them. However, it is limited in use due to its ready decomposition into elemental hydrogen and astatine, as well as the short half-life of the various isotopes of astatine. Because the atoms have a nearly equal electronegativity, and as the At^{+} ion has been observed, dissociation could easily result in the hydrogen carrying the negative charge. Thus, a hydrogen astatide sample can undergo the following reaction:

2 HAt → H^{+} + At^{−} + H^{−} + At^{+} → H_{2} + At_{2}

This results in elemental hydrogen gas and astatine precipitate. Furthermore, a trend for hydrogen halides, or HX, is that enthalpy of formation becomes less negative, i.e., decreases in magnitude but increases in absolute terms, as the halide becomes larger. Whereas hydroiodic acid solutions are stable, the hydronium-astatide solution is clearly less stable than the water-hydrogen-astatine system. Finally, radiolysis from astatine nuclei could sever the H–At bonds.

Additionally, astatine has no stable isotopes. The most stable is astatine-210, which has a half-life of approximately 8.1 hours, making its chemical compounds especially difficult to work with, as the astatine will quickly decay into other elements.

== Preparation ==
Hydrogen astatide can be produced by reacting astatine with hydrocarbons (such as ethane):

C_{2}H_{6} + At_{2} → C_{2}H_{5}At + HAt

This reaction also produces the corresponding alkyl astatide, in this case ethyl astatide (astatoethane).
