= Hydrogen iodide (data page) =

Chemical data page

This page provides supplementary chemical data on hydrogen iodide.

== Structure and properties ==
Structure and properties
Dielectric constant	1.00214 ε_{0} at 20 °C
Bond strength	298.407 kJ/mol
Bond length	160.9 pm

== Material Safety Data Sheet ==
The handling of this chemical may incur notable safety precautions. It is highly recommend that you seek the Material Safety Datasheet (MSDS) for this chemical from a reliable source such as SIRI, and follow its directions.

- hydrogen iodide MSDS
This box:
- Except where noted otherwise, data relate to Standard temperature and pressure.
- Reliability of data general note.
