= Traude Bernert =

Austrian physicist and nuclear chemist

Gertrud "Traude" Cless-Bernert (née Tauschinski, 1915–1998) was an Austrian physicist and nuclear chemist known for her discovery with Berta Karlik of naturally occurring isotopes of the element astatine.

== Research ==
After graduating in 1933, Bernert began studies as an architecture student at TU Wien, but left after a term. Instead, she became a physics student at the University of Vienna, where she completed a Ph.D. in 1939 under the joint supervision of Gustav Ortner, Eduard Haschek, and Egon Schweidler.

Her discovery of astatine came through volunteer research with Berta Karlik at the Vienna Institute of Radium Research, during World War II. Astatine had been synthesized in 1940 at the University of California, Berkeley, but was not known to occur in nature, despite several unconfirmed claims of its discovery, until Bernert and Karlik found three of its isotopes in the nuclear decay of other elements, in 1943. Their discovery was the last of any element in nature.

After the war she became a technician for the institute, and after 1959 worked for the Atoms for Peace conference in Geneva and then in the Department of Industrial Consulting for Isotope Application of the Austrian Reactor Center Seibersdorf. She was the author of the book Die künstliche Radioaktivität in Biologie und Medizin: Eine gemeinverständliche Einführung (Artificial Radioactivity in Biology and Medicine: A Non-Technical Introduction, Springer, 1949).

== Personal life ==
Bernert was born on 27 June 1915 in Vienna. Her name Bernert came from her first marriage, in 1940, from which she had a son. She married again in 1961, to F. Cless, an engineer, and retired early after an accident. She died on 20 February 1998, in Wartmannstetten.
