= Astatine compounds =

Compounds that contain the element astatine (At)

Astatine compounds are compounds that contain the element astatine (At). As this element is very radioactive, few compounds have been studied. Less reactive than iodine, astatine is the least reactive of the halogens. Its compounds have been synthesized in nano-scale amounts and studied as intensively as possible before their radioactive disintegration. The reactions involved have been typically tested with dilute solutions of astatine mixed with larger amounts of iodine. Acting as a carrier, the iodine ensures there is sufficient material for laboratory techniques (such as filtration and precipitation) to work. (Note: Iodine can act as a carrier despite it reacting with astatine in water because these reactions require iodide (I^{−}), not (only) I_{2}.) Like iodine, astatine has been shown to adopt odd-numbered oxidation states ranging from −1 to +7.

The chemistry of astatine is "clouded by the extremely low concentrations at which astatine experiments have been conducted, and the possibility of reactions with impurities, walls and filters, or radioactivity by-products, and other unwanted nano-scale interactions". Many of its apparent chemical properties have been observed using tracer studies on extremely dilute astatine solutions, typically less than 10^{−10} mol·L^{−1}. Some properties, such as anion formation, align with other halogens. Astatine has some metallic characteristics as well, such as plating onto a cathode, (Note: It is also possible that this is sorption on a cathode.) and coprecipitating with metal sulfides in hydrochloric acid. It forms complexes with EDTA, a metal chelating agent, and is capable of acting as a metal in antibody radiolabeling; in some respects, astatine in the +1 state is akin to silver in the same state. Most of the organic chemistry of astatine is, however, analogous to that of iodine. It has been suggested that astatine can form a stable monatomic cation in aqueous solution.

== Astatides ==
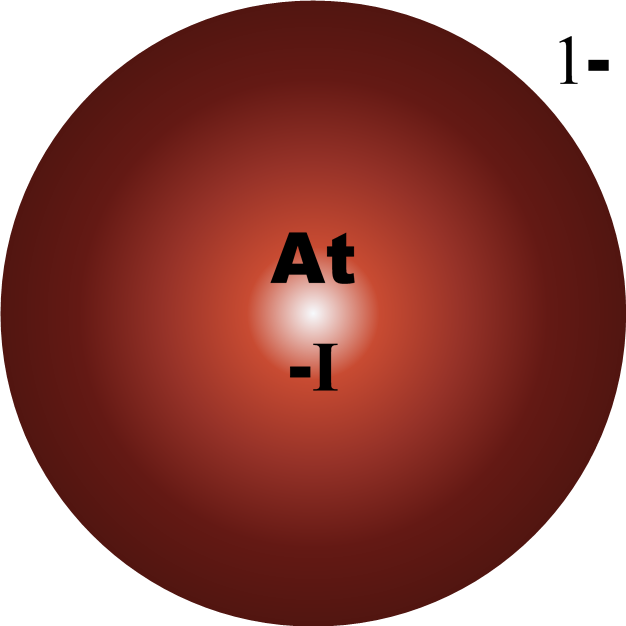
Astatide

Only a few compounds with metals have been reported, in the form of astatides of sodium, palladium, silver, thallium, and lead. Astatine can also form astatide complexes with mercury, rhodium and iridium. Some characteristic properties of silver and sodium astatide, and the other hypothetical alkali and alkaline earth astatides, have been estimated by extrapolation from other metal halides. Caesium astatide is predicted to be only sparingly soluble in water, just like lithium fluoride.

Hydrogen astatide space-filling model

The formation of an astatine compound with hydrogen – usually referred to as hydrogen astatide – was noted by the pioneers of astatine chemistry. As mentioned, there are grounds for instead referring to this compound as astatine hydride. It is easily oxidized; acidification by dilute nitric acid gives the At^{0} or At^{+} forms, and the subsequent addition of silver(I) may only partially, at best, precipitate astatine as silver(I) astatide (AgAt). Iodine, in contrast, is not oxidized, and precipitates readily as silver(I) iodide.

== Other inorganic compounds ==
Astatine is known to bind to boron and nitrogen. Various boron cage compounds have been prepared with At–B bonds, these being more stable than At–C bonds. The dipyridine-astatine(I) cation, [At(C_{5}H_{5}N)_{2}]^{+}, forms ionic compounds with perchlorate (a non-coordinating anion) and with nitrate, [At(C_{5}H_{5}N)_{2}]NO_{3}. This cation exists as a coordination complex in which two dative covalent bonds separately link the astatine(I) centre with each of the pyridine rings via their nitrogen atoms.

With oxygen, there is evidence of the species AtO^{−} and AtO^{+} in aqueous solution, formed by the reaction of astatine with an oxidant such as elemental bromine or (in the last case) by sodium persulfate in a solution of perchloric acid: the latter species might also be protonated astatous acid, H_{2}AtO^{+}_{2}. The species previously thought to be AtO^{−}_{2} has since been determined to be AtO(OH)^{−}_{2}, a hydrolysis product of AtO^{+} (another such hydrolysis product being AtOOH). The well characterized AtO^{−}_{3} anion can be obtained by, for example, the oxidation of astatine with potassium hypochlorite in a solution of potassium hydroxide. Preparation of lanthanum triastatate La(AtO_{3})_{3}, following the oxidation of astatine by a hot Na_{2}S_{2}O_{8} solution, has been reported. Further oxidation of AtO^{−}_{3}, such as by xenon difluoride (in a hot alkaline solution) or periodate (in a neutral or alkaline solution), yields the perastatate ion AtO^{−}_{4}; this is only stable in neutral or alkaline solutions. Astatine is also thought to be capable of forming cations in salts with oxyanions such as iodate or dichromate; this is based on the observation that, in acidic solutions, monovalent or intermediate positive states of astatine coprecipitate with the insoluble salts of metal cations such as silver(I) iodate or thallium(I) dichromate.

Astatine may form bonds to the other chalcogens; these include S_{7}At^{+} and At(CSN)^{−}_{2} with sulfur, a coordination selenourea compound with selenium, and an astatine–tellurium colloid with tellurium.

Structure of astatine monoiodide, one of the astatine interhalogens and the heaviest known diatomic interhalogen.

Astatine is known to react with its lighter homologs iodine, bromine, and chlorine in the vapor state; these reactions produce diatomic interhalogen compounds with formulas AtI, AtBr, and AtCl. The first two compounds may also be produced in water – astatine reacts with iodine/iodide solution to form AtI, whereas AtBr requires (aside from astatine) an iodine/iodine monobromide/bromide solution. The excess of iodides or bromides may lead to AtBr^{−}_{2} and AtI^{−}_{2} ions, or in a chloride solution, they may produce species like AtCl^{−}_{2} or AtBrCl^{−} via equilibrium reactions with the chlorides. Oxidation of the element with dichromate (in nitric acid solution) showed that adding chloride turned the astatine into a molecule likely to be either AtCl or AtOCl. Similarly, AtOCl^{−}_{2} or AtCl^{−}_{2} may be produced. The polyhalides PdAtI_{2}, CsAtI_{2}, TlAtI_{2}, and PbAtI are known or presumed to have been precipitated. In a plasma ion source mass spectrometer, the ions [AtI]^{+}, [AtBr]^{+}, and [AtCl]^{+} have been formed by introducing lighter halogen vapors into a helium-filled cell containing astatine, supporting the existence of stable neutral molecules in the plasma ion state. No astatine fluorides have been discovered yet. Their absence has been speculatively attributed to the extreme reactivity of such compounds, including the reaction of an initially formed fluoride with the walls of the glass container to form a non-volatile product. (Note: An initial attempt to fluoridate astatine using chlorine trifluoride resulted in formation of a product which became stuck to the glass. Chlorine monofluoride, chlorine, and tetrafluorosilane were formed. The authors called the effect "puzzling", admitting they had expected formation of a volatile fluoride. Ten years later, the compound was predicted to be non-volatile, out of line with the other halogens but similar to radon fluoride; by this time, the latter had been shown to be ionic.) Thus, although the synthesis of an astatine fluoride is thought to be possible, it may require a liquid halogen fluoride solvent, as has already been used for the characterization of radon fluoride.

== Organoastatine compounds ==
Most of the organic chemistry of astatine is analogous to iodine. Astatine can replace a hydrogen atom in benzene to form astatobenzene C_{6}H_{5}At; this may be oxidized to C_{6}H_{5}AtCl_{2} by chlorine. By treating this compound with an alkaline solution of hypochlorite, C_{6}H_{5}AtO_{2} can be produced. Astatine-labelled iodine reagents have been used to synthesise RAt, RAtCl_{2}, R_{2}AtCl, and RAtO_{2} (R = phenyl or p-tolyl). Alkyl and aryl astatides are relatively stable and have been analysed at high temperatures (120 °C) with radio gas chromatography. Demercuration reactions have produced with good yields trace quantities of ^{211}At-containing aromatic amino acids, steroids, and imidazoles, among other compounds.
