= Berta Karlik =

Austrian physicist (1904–1990)

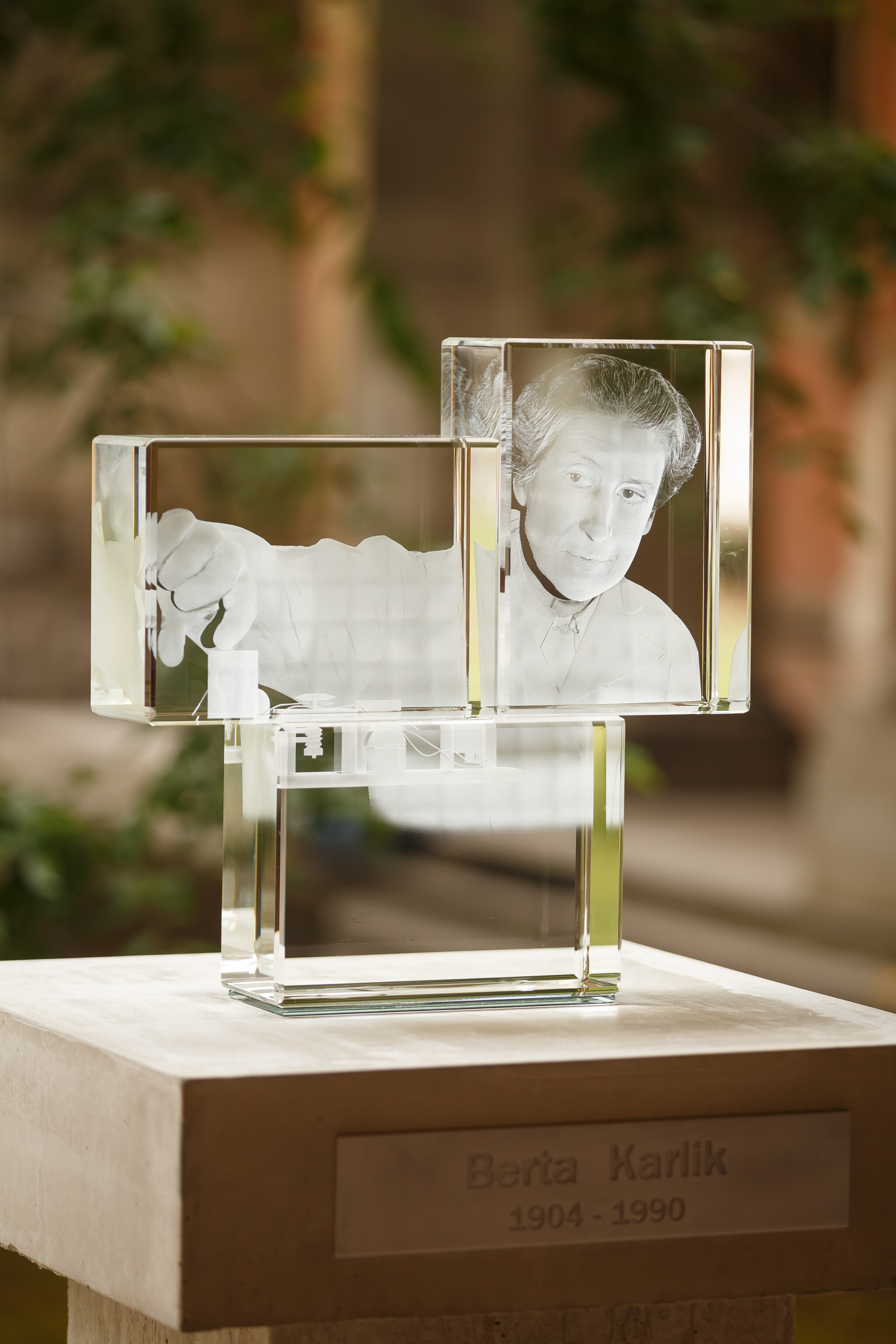
- Berta Karlik memorial at the University of Vienna
- Born: 24 January 1904; Vienna, Austria-Hungary
- Died: 4 February 1990 (aged 86); Vienna, Austria
- Education: University of Vienna
- Known for: Discovered of astatine in natural decay processes products
- Awards: Wilhelm Exner Medal, 1954
- Scientific career
- Workplaces: Institut für Radiumforschung

Berta Karlik (24 January 1904 – 4 February 1990) was an Austrian physicist. She worked for the University of Vienna, eventually becoming the first female professor at the institution. While working with Ernst Foyn, she published a paper on the radioactivity of seawater. In work with Traude Bernert, she discovered that the chemical element 85 astatine is a product of natural decay processes. The element was first synthesized in 1940 by Dale R. Corson, K. R. MacKenzie, and Emilio Segrè after several scientists in vain searched for it in radioactive minerals.

== Biography ==
=== Early life and education ===
Berta Karlik was born in Vienna to an upper-class family and was home-taught for her elementary education. While being taught at home, she learned to play the piano and speak and write French, Dutch, and English. From 1919 to 1923, she attended the Reform-Realgymnasium. Upon graduating in 1923, she was accepted as a regular student to the Philosophical Faculty at the University of Vienna until 1928, when she received her Ph.D.

While enrolled at the university, Karlik became an essential member of Hans Pettersson's research group at the Radium Institute, where her specialty was the scintillation counter. Karlik also attended a fellowship from the International Federation of University Women, which required her to travel while working for the Radium Institute.

After receiving her degree in physics, Karlik accepted a teaching position at the Realgymnasium in Vienna, where she was a former pupil.

=== Entering the field ===
In 1930, Karlik found a job at a laboratory run by William Henry Bragg in London. Here, she worked on crystallography and used X-rays to study the structure of crystals. Karlik's knowledge of radiophysics attracted the attention of noted crystallographers Ellie Knaggs and Helen Gilchrist. The year that she formed a group with these two women was the same year she first visited Marie Curie's lab in Paris which signaled the start of her lengthy correspondence with various other female physicists.

While Karlik occasionally wrote to Marie Curie, she kept regular correspondence with other notable physicists such as Ellen Gleditsch and Eva Resmtedt, two of the Curie researchers, and Lise Meitner, with whom Karlik was quite close during her life. Throughout her life, she would meet with Meitner, who worked with the team responsible for discovering nuclear fission.

=== Research ===
After studying in Paris and London, she started working at the Institut für Radiumforschung (Institute for Radium Research) in Vienna in 1931. From 1937, she was allowed to give lectures and slowly advanced in the institute's hierarchy.

Simultaneously, Karlik joined a group on seawater research headed by the Swedish physicist Hans Pettersson. Mixing knowledge of oceanography and radioactivity, Karlik helped to bring up concerns about the biological issue of uranium contamination of seawater.

During the Second World War, she made her most important discovery, that the element with the atomic number 85, Astatine, was a product of natural decay. Astatine's main use is in radiotherapy to kill cancer cells. Due to this discovery, Karlik was awarded the Haitinger Prize for Chemistry from the Austrian Academy of Sciences in 1947.

She became provisional director of the institute in 1945 and official director in 1947 upon discovering the existence of astatine. Berta Karlik was the first woman to be a full professor ("ordentliche Professur") at the University of Vienna in 1956. She retired in 1973 but worked at the institute until she died in 1990.

=== Publications ===
- "An Alpha-Radiation Ascribed to Element 85," S.B.Akad. Wiss. Wien, 152:Abt. IIa (Nos. 6–10) 103-110(1943), with T. Bernert.
- "Element 85 in the Natural Disintegration Series," Z. Phys., 123: (Nos. 1–2) 51-72 (1944), with T. Bernert.
- "Uranium Content of Seawater," Akad. Wiss. Wien, Ber, 144:2a (Nos.5-6) 217-225 (1935), with F. Hernegger.

== See also ==
- Timeline of women in science
- Women in physics

== Sources ==
- Archive, Austrian Academy of Sciences, Vienna, Archivbehelf: Institut fur Radiumforschung, XIII. Berta Karlik, Karton 43, Fiche 629
