= Philip Leigh-Smith =

British diplomat and author

Philip Leigh-Smith, pen name Christopher Rover (1892–1972) was a British diplomat and author. He took part in relief missions to Russia during the Bolshevic Revolution and served in significant postings in various locations, including Rome and Bern where he was chargé d'affaires in the late 1930s.

He married the Croatian-born scientist Alice Prebil in 1933. His successful works include Pandemonium, The Red Horse, and Ladies in Diplomacy. The couple are buried together in Opatija, Croatia.
