= Sodium astatide =

Inorganic compound of sodium and astatine

Names
- Preferred IUPAC name Sodium astatide

Identifiers
CAS Number	15194-75-9
3D model (JSmol)	Interactive image
PubChem CID	176262708
- InChI: InChI=1S/At.Na/q-1;+1 Key: AXOFGGQEXCHHCD-UHFFFAOYSA-N
- SMILES: [Na+].[At-]

Properties
Chemical formula	NaAt
Molar mass	233 g·mol^{−1}
Melting point	518 °C (964 °F; 791 K) calculated

Thermochemistry
Std enthalpy of formation (Δ_{f}H^{⦵}_{298})	−257 kJ/mol (estimated)

Related compounds
Related compounds	Magnesium astatide
- Except where otherwise noted, data are given for materials in their standard state (at 25 °C [77 °F], 100 kPa). Infobox references

Sodium astatide is a binary inorganic compound, a salt of sodium and astatine with the chemical formula NaAt.

== Synthesis ==
Sodium astatide solution has been prepared by distilling astatine from the bismuth alpha-ray target where it was prepared, dissolving in sodium bicarbonate solution, and reducing At^{+} and At^{3+} ions with ascorbic acid.

== Uses ==
Sodium astatide has been proposed for use in radiation therapy to replace ^{131}I.
