= Hydrogen iodide =

Chemical substance

- Hydrogen iodide

- Hydrogen iodide

Names
- IUPAC name Hydrogen iodide
- Systematic IUPAC name Iodane
- Other names: Hydroiodic acid (aqueous solution); Iodine hydride

Identifiers
CAS Number	10034-85-2
3D model (JSmol)	Interactive image
ChEBI	CHEBI:43451
ChemSpider	23224
ECHA InfoCard	100.030.087
EC Number	233-109-9
KEGG	C05590
PubChem CID	24841
RTECS number	MW3760000
UNII	694C0EFT9Q
UN number	1787 2197
CompTox Dashboard (EPA)	DTXSID2044349
- InChI: InChI=1S/HI/h1H Key: XMBWDFGMSWQBCA-UHFFFAOYSA-N
- SMILES: I

Properties
Chemical formula	HI
Molar mass	127.912 g·mol^{−1}
Appearance	Colorless gas
Odor	acrid
Density	2.85 g/mL (−47 °C)
Melting point	−50.80 °C (−59.44 °F; 222.35 K)
Boiling point	−35.36 °C (−31.65 °F; 237.79 K)
Critical point (T, P)	151 °C (424 K), 8.31 MPa
Solubility in water	approximately 245 g/100 ml
Acidity (pK_{a})	−10 (in water, estimate); −9.5 (±1.0) 2.8 (in acetonitrile)
Conjugate acid	Iodonium
Conjugate base	Iodide
Refractive index (n_{D})	1.466 (16 °C)

Structure
Molecular shape	Terminus
Dipole moment	0.38 D

Thermochemistry
Heat capacity (C)	29.2 J mol^{−1}·K^{−1}
Std molar entropy (S^{⦵}_{298})	206.6 J mol^{−1}·K^{−1}
Std enthalpy of formation (Δ_{f}H^{⦵}_{298})	26.5 kJ mol^{−1}
Gibbs free energy (Δ_{f}G^{⦵})	1.7 kJ mol^{−1}
Enthalpy of fusion (Δ_{f}H^{⦵}_{fus})	2.87 kJ mol^{−1}
Enthalpy of vaporization (Δ_{f}H_{vap})	17.36 kJ mol^{−1}

Hazards
- Occupational safety and health (OHS/OSH)
Main hazards	Toxic, corrosive, harmful and irritant
- GHS labelling
Pictograms	(GHS05: Corrosive) (GHS06: Toxic)
Signal word	Danger
Hazard statements	H302, H314
Precautionary statements	P260, P264, P280, P301+P330+P331, P303+P361+P353, P304+P340, P305+P351+P338, P310, P321, P363, P405, P501
NFPA 704 (fire diamond)	3 0 1 COR
Flash point	Non-flammable
- Lethal dose or concentration (LD, LC)
LD_{50} (median dose)	345 mg/kg (rat, orally)
Safety data sheet (SDS)	hydrogen iodide

Related compounds
Other anions	Hydrogen fluoride; Hydrogen chloride; Hydrogen bromide; Hydrogen astatide

Supplementary data page
- Hydrogen iodide (data page)
- Except where otherwise noted, data are given for materials in their standard state (at 25 °C [77 °F], 100 kPa). verify (what is ?) Infobox references

Hydrogen iodide (HI) is a diatomic molecule and hydrogen halide. Aqueous solutions of HI are known as hydroiodic acid or hydriodic acid, a strong acid. Hydrogen iodide and hydroiodic acid are, however, different in that the former is a gas under standard conditions, whereas the latter is an aqueous solution of the gas. They are interconvertible. HI is used in organic and inorganic synthesis as one of the primary sources of iodine and as a reducing agent.

== Properties of hydrogen iodide ==
HI is a colorless gas that reacts with oxygen to give water and iodine. With moist air, HI gives a mist (or fumes) of hydroiodic acid. It is exceptionally soluble in water, giving hydroiodic acid. One liter of water will dissolve 425 liters of HI gas, the most concentrated solution having only four water molecules per molecule of HI.

=== Hydroiodic acid ===
Hydroiodic acid is an aqueous solution of hydrogen iodide. Commercial "concentrated" hydroiodic acid usually contains 48–57% HI by mass. The solution forms an azeotrope boiling at 127 °C with 57% HI, 43% water. The high acidity is caused by the dispersal of the ionic charge over the anion. The iodide ion radius is much larger than the other common halides, which results in the negative charge being dispersed over a large volume. This weaker H^{+}···I^{−} interaction in HI facilitates dissociation of the proton from the anion and is the reason HI is the strongest acid of the hydrohalides.

HI(g) + H_{2}O(l) → H_{3}O^{+}(aq) + I^{−}(aq) K_{a} ≈ 10^{10}
HBr(g) + H_{2}O(l) → H_{3}O^{+}(aq) + Br^{−}(aq) K_{a} ≈ 10^{9}
HCl(g) + H_{2}O(l) → H_{3}O^{+}(aq) + Cl^{−}(aq) K_{a} ≈ 10^{6}

== Synthesis ==
The industrial preparation of HI involves the reaction of I_{2} with hydrazine, which also yields nitrogen gas:

2 I_{2} + N_{2}H_{4} → 4 HI + N_{2}

When the synthesis is performed in water, the HI can be purified by distillation.

Anhydrous HI can be prepared by reaction of iodine with tetrahydronaphthalene:

C_{10}H_{12} + 2 I_{2} → C_{10}H_{8} + 4 HI

HI can also be distilled from a solution of NaI or other alkali iodide that is treated with the dehydration reagent phosphorus pentoxide (which gives phosphoric acid). Concentrated sulfuric acid is unsuited for acidifying iodides, as it oxidizes the iodide to elemental iodine.

A historical route to HI involves oxidation of hydrogen sulfide with aqueous iodine:

H_{2}S + I_{2} → 2 HI + S

Additionally, HI can be prepared by simply combining H_{2} and I_{2}:

H_{2} + I_{2} → 2 HI

This method, which can be catalyzed by platinum, is usually employed to generate high-purity samples. For many years, this reaction was considered to involve a simple bimolecular reaction between molecules of H_{2} and I_{2}. However, when a mixture of the gases is irradiated with the wavelength of light equal to the dissociation energy of I_{2}, about 578 nm, the rate increases significantly. This supports a mechanism whereby I_{2} first dissociates into two iodine atoms, which each attach themselves to a side of an H_{2} molecule and break the H−H bond:

H_{2} + I_{2} + (_{578} nm radiation) → H_{2} + 2I → I···H···H···I → 2HI

In the laboratory, yet another method involves hydrolysis of PI_{3}, the iodine analog of PBr_{3}. In this method, I_{2} reacts with phosphorus to create phosphorus triiodide, which then reacts with water to form HI and phosphorous acid:

3 I_{2} + 2 P + 6 H_{2}O → 6 HI + 2 H_{3}PO_{3}

== Reactions ==
Solutions of hydrogen iodide are easily oxidized by air:

4 HI + O_{2} → 2 H_{2}O + 2 I_{2}
HI + I_{2} ⇌ HI_{3}

HI_{3} is brown in color, which makes aged solutions of HI often appear dark.

Like HBr and HCl, HI adds to alkenes, in a reaction that is subject to the same Markovnikov and anti-Markovnikov guidelines as HCl and HBr.

HI + RCH=CH_{2} → RCH(I)−CH_{3}

HI is also used in organic chemistry to convert primary alcohols into alkyl iodides. This reaction is an S_{N}2 substitution, in which the iodide ion replaces the "activated" hydroxyl group (water):

HI + RCH_{2}OH → RCH_{2}I + H_{2}O

HI is sometimes preferred over other hydrogen halides.

HI (or HBr) can also be used to cleave ethers. Commonly, it is applied to the cleavage of aryl-alkyl ethers to give phenols and the alkyl iodide. In the following idealized equation diethyl ether is split into two equivalents of ethyl iodide:

2 HI + (CH_{3}CH_{2})_{2}O → 2 CH_{3}CH_{2}I + H_{2}O

The reaction is regioselective, as iodide tends to attack the less sterically hindered ether carbon.

HI was commonly employed as a reducing agent early on in the history of organic chemistry. Chemists in the 19th century attempted to prepare cyclohexane by HI reduction of benzene at high temperatures, but instead isolated the rearranged product, methylcyclopentane (see the article on cyclohexane). As first reported by Kiliani, hydroiodic acid reduction of sugars and other polyols results in the reductive cleavage of several or even all hydroxy groups, although often with poor yield and/or reproducibility. In the case of benzyl alcohols and alcohols with α-carbonyl groups, reduction by HI can provide synthetically useful yields of the corresponding hydrocarbon product (ROH + 2 HI → RH + H_{2}O + I_{2}). This process can be made catalytic in HI using red phosphorus to reduce the formed I_{2}.

== Applications ==
Commercial processes for obtaining iodine all focus on iodide-rich brines. The purification begins by converting iodide to hydroiodic acid, which is then oxidized to iodine. The iodine is then separated by evaporation or adsorption.
