= Isabel Ellie Knaggs =

Crystallographer

- Born: 2 August 1893; Durban
- Died: 29 November 1981 (aged 88); Sydney, Australia
- Education: Imperial College London; Girton College, Cambridge; Bedford College, London
- Scientific career
- Workplaces: Royal Institution; Burroughs Wellcome

Isabel Ellie Knaggs (2 August 1893 – 29 November 1980) was a Colony of Natal born crystallographer. She was educated and worked in the UK. She worked with Kathleen Lonsdale on the crystal structure of benzil.

== Early life and education ==
Knaggs was born in Durban. She may have attended a Froebel kindergarten in Hampstead. She attended North London Collegiate School and later attended Bedford College, London. In 1913 Knaggs joined Girton College at the University of Cambridge to study chemistry. She studied with William Pope on the determination of crystal structures. Arthur Hutchinson appointed her as a research assistant. She was elected as a member of the Geological Society of London in 1921. She completed her PhD, The Relation between the Crystal Structure and Constitution of Carbon Compounds, with Special Reference to Simple Substitution Products of Methane, in 1923 at Imperial College London. During her PhD Knaggs remained as a demonstrator in geology at Bedford College, London.

== Research ==
In 1925 she was awarded a two-year Hertha Ayrton fellowship to join the Royal Institution. Knaggs worked with William Henry Bragg and Kathleen Lonsdale. She looked at diffuse reflection of x-rays from single crystals. She secured a permanent position in 1927. She determined the crystal structure of cyanuric triazide.

Knaggs co-authored Tables of Cubic Crystal Structures with Berta Karlik and Constance Elam in 1932. She served as an advisor to Burroughs Wellcome (now GlaxoSmithKline). In her retirement, Knaggs was elected as a visiting scientist to the Royal Institution.

== Personal life ==
In 1979, Knaggs moved to Australia. On 29 November 1980, Knaggs died in Sydney, Australia.
