= Kenneth Ross MacKenzie =

American physicist (1912–2002)

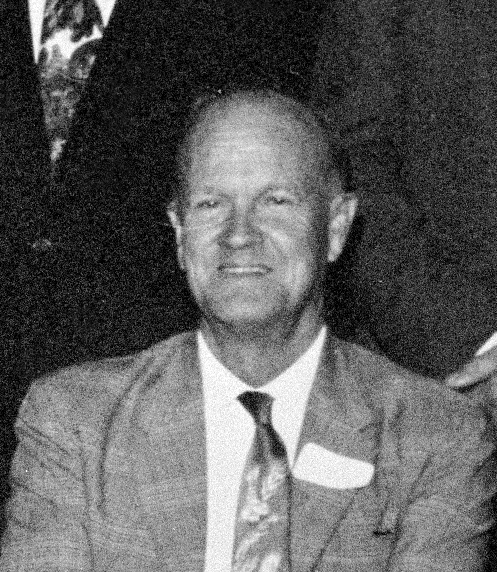
- MacKenzie in 1971
- Born: June 15, 1912; Portland, Oregon, U.S.
- Died: July 3, 2002 (aged 90); Los Angeles, California, U.S.
- Education: University of British Columbia (BS, MS); University of California, Berkeley (PhD)
- Known for: Synthesis of astatine
- Scientific career
- Fields: Nuclear physics
- Workplaces: Lawrence Livermore National Laboratory; University of California, Los Angeles
- Doctoral advisor: Ernest Lawrence

Kenneth Ross MacKenzie (June 15, 1912 – July 3, 2002) was an American nuclear physicist. Together with Dale R. Corson and Emilio Segrè, he synthesized the element astatine, in 1940. MacKenzie received his PhD under Ernest Lawrence at Lawrence Livermore National Laboratory. Lawrence, MacKenzie, and their colleagues devised the first cyclotron.

MacKenzie was a professor of physics at the University of California, Los Angeles (UCLA), where he and Reg Richardson built UCLA's first cyclotron and later a Bevatron. MacKenzie devised MacKenzie buckets which are plasma sources created by lining vacuum chamber walls with permanent magnets of alternating polarity to suppress plasma electron losses, that are widely used to this day. He later traveled around the world, helping to troubleshoot various country's cyclotron problems. Later in life, he studied plasma physics and dark matter.

== Early life and career ==
Mackenzie’s family moved to Victoria, British Columbia when he was age 10. He received his Bachelor's degree and Master's degree from the University of British Columbia, and began further study at the University of California, Berkeley, in 1937. As a graduate student, Kenneth Ross Mackenzie was involved in the Manhattan Project to help solve how to separate the rare uranium-235 isotope from the identical dominant uranium-238 isotope at Oak Ridge, Tennessee. While working on the Manhattan project, MacKenzie and colleagues borrowed 14,700 tons of silver from the US Treasury and melted it into strands to replace old copper in their magnetic coils. After the war, the silver was melted and returned to the treasury.

== Other roles ==
As an actor, he played minor roles with Yvonne De Carlo in Ride the Pink Horse (1947), River Lady (1948) and Black Bart (1948).

He died in Los Angeles on 4 July 2002 at aged 90.
