= Hydrogen halide =

Chemical compound consisting of hydrogen bonded to a halogen element

In chemistry, hydrogen halides (hydrohalic acids when in the aqueous phase) are diatomic, inorganic compounds that function as Arrhenius acids. The formula is HX where X is one of the halogens: fluorine, chlorine, bromine, iodine, or astatine. All known hydrogen halides are gases at standard temperature and pressure.

Compound	Chemical formula	Bond length d(H−X) / pm (gas phase)	model	Dipole μ / D	Aqueous phase (acid)	Aqueous Phase pK_{a} values
hydrogen fluoride (fluorane)	HF			1.86	hydrofluoric acid	3.1
hydrogen chloride (chlorane)	HCl			1.11	hydrochloric acid	−3.9
hydrogen bromide (bromane)	HBr			0.788	hydrobromic acid	−5.8
hydrogen iodide (iodane)	HI			0.382	hydroiodic acid	−10.4
hydrogen astatide astatine hydride (astatane)	HAt			−0.06	hydroastatic acid	?

== Comparison to hydrohalic acids ==
The hydrogen halides are diatomic molecules with no tendency to ionize in the gas phase (although liquified hydrogen fluoride is a polar solvent somewhat similar to water). Thus, chemists distinguish hydrogen chloride from hydrochloric acid. Hydrogen chloride is a gas at room temperature that reacts with water to give hydrochloric acid; once the acid has formed, the hydrogen chloride can be regenerated, but only with difficulty and not by normal distillation. Often, the names of the acid and the molecules are not clearly distinguished, and in lab jargon, "HCl" often means hydrochloric acid, not the gaseous hydrogen chloride.

== Occurrence and production ==
Hydrogen fluoride, chloride, and bromide are volcanic gases.

The hydrogen halides can be produced by many routes industrially and in the laboratory. Focusing on the most abundant compound, hydrogen chloride is mainly produced as a side product in production of chlorocarbons. Hydrogen fluoride is a byproduct of the production of phosphoric acid. Fluorine, chlorine, and bromine react with hydrogen gas to give HF, HCl, and HBr. These gases can also be produced by treatment of halide salts with sulfuric acid. The least stable hydrogen halide, HI, is produced less directly, by the reaction of iodine with hydrogen sulfide or with hydrazine.

== Physical properties ==
Comparison of the boiling points of hydrogen halides and hydrogen chalcogenides; here it can be seen that hydrogen fluoride breaks trends alongside water.

The hydrogen halides are colourless gases at standard conditions for temperature and pressure (STP) except for hydrogen fluoride, which boils at 19 °C. Alone of the hydrogen halides, hydrogen fluoride exhibits hydrogen bonding between molecules, and therefore has the highest melting and boiling points of the HX series. From HCl to HI the boiling point rises. This trend is attributed to the increasing strength of intermolecular van der Waals forces, which correlates with numbers of electrons in the molecules. Concentrated hydrohalic acid solutions produce visible white fumes. This mist arises from the formation of tiny droplets of their concentrated aqueous solutions of the hydrohalic acid.

== Reactions ==
Upon dissolution in water, which is highly exothermic, the hydrogen halides give the corresponding acids. These acids are very strong, reflecting their tendency to ionize in aqueous solution, yielding hydronium ions (H_{3}O^{+}). With the exception of hydrofluoric acid, the hydrogen halides are strong acids, with acid strength increasing down the group. Hydrofluoric acid is complicated because its strength depends on the concentration, owing to the effects of homoconjugation. However, as solutions in non-aqueous solvents, such as acetonitrile, the hydrogen halides are only moderately acidic.

Similarly, the hydrogen halides react with ammonia (and other bases), forming ammonium halides:

HX + NH_{3} → NH_{4}X

In organic chemistry, the hydrohalogenation reaction is used to prepare halocarbons. For example, chloroethane is produced by hydrochlorination of ethylene:

C_{2}H_{4} + HCl → CH_{3}CH_{2}Cl

== See also ==
- Pseudohalogen
- Hypohalous acid
- Group 13 hydrides
- Group 14 hydrides
- Group 15 hydrides
- Group 16 hydrides
