= Walter Minder =

Swiss chemist (1905–1992)

- Born: August 6, 1905; Seeland, Switzerland
- Died: April 1, 1992 (aged 86); Bern, Switzerland
- Education: University of Bern
- Scientific career
- Workplaces: University of Bern
- Doctoral advisor: Emil Hugi

Walter Minder (August 6, 1905 – April 1, 1992) was a Swiss mineralogist and chemist. In 1931, he became professor of radiology at the Institut du Radium at the University of Bern. He together with Alice Leigh-Smith announced the discovery of element 85 (now called astatine) in 1940 and 1942. He proposed the name helvetium in 1940 and anglohelvetium in 1942 for the new element. Later it was proven that in fact he had not discovered element 85.

Later he worked on dosimetry and the effects of ionising radiation. He was a pacifist and regretted that the atomic bomb had been dropped on Hiroshima on his 40th birthday. In 1960 he participated in two pacifist demonstrations against the possibility of Switzerland purchasing nuclear weapons. He retired in 1964. He published a book on the history of radioactivity in 1981.
