= Dibutyl ether =

Names
- Preferred IUPAC name 1-Butoxybutane
- Other names: Di-n-butyl ether; Butyl ether; n-Butyl ether; Butoxybutane

Identifiers
CAS Number	142-96-1
3D model (JSmol)	Interactive image
ChemSpider	8569
ECHA InfoCard	100.005.069
PubChem CID	8909
UNII	PBM2R52P5G
CompTox Dashboard (EPA)	DTXSID1022007
- InChI: InChI=1S/C8H18O/c1-3-5-7-9-8-6-4-2/h3-8H2,1-2H3 Key: DURPTKYDGMDSBL-UHFFFAOYSA-N; InChI=1/C8H18O/c1-3-5-7-9-8-6-4-2/h3-8H2,1-2H3 Key: DURPTKYDGMDSBL-UHFFFAOYAH
- SMILES: CCCCOCCCC

Properties
Chemical formula	C_{8}H_{18}O
Molar mass	130.231 g·mol^{−1}
Appearance	Colorless liquid
Odor	Fruity
Density	0.77 g/cm^{3} (20 °C)
Melting point	−95 °C (−139 °F; 178 K)
Boiling point	141 °C (286 °F; 414 K)
Solubility in water	0.3 g/L
Refractive index (n_{D})	1.3992
Viscosity	0.741 cP (15 °C)

Structure
Dipole moment	1.18 D

Hazards
Flash point	25 °C (77 °F; 298 K)
Autoignition temperature	175 °C (347 °F; 448 K)
- Lethal dose or concentration (LD, LC)
LD_{50} (median dose)	7400 mg/kg (oral, rat)
- Except where otherwise noted, data are given for materials in their standard state (at 25 °C [77 °F], 100 kPa). Infobox references

Dibutyl ether is a chemical compound belonging to the ether family with the molecular formula of C_{8}H_{18}O. It is colorless, volatile, and flammable liquid and has peculiar ethereal smell.

Liquid dibutyl ether is lighter than water. On the other hand, the vapor is heavier than air. It is not soluble in water, but it is soluble in acetone and many other organic solvents. Due to this property, dibutyl ether is used as solvent in various chemical reactions and processes. For example, phenyllithium is commercially available as a ca. 1.8M solution in dibutyl ether.

To prevent the formation of peroxides, it should be protected from heat, light and air.

== Synthesis ==
Dibutyl ether is obtained from dehydration of 1-butanol with sulfuric acid as a catalyst and dehydrating agent:

2C_{4}H_{9}OH → C_{8}H_{18}O + H_{2}O

Industrially, dibutyl ether can be obtained by dehydration of 1-butanol on alumina at 300 °C.

== Reactions ==
This compound is generally stable to oxidation, reduction, and base. Strong acids like Hydroiodic acid and Hydrobromic acid can cleave this ether. In the presence of oxygen, dibutyl ether is oxidized to a peroxide or hydroperoxide.

== Applications ==
- Solvent for Grignard syntheses
- Solvent for fats, oils, organic acids, alkaloids, natural and synthetic resins
- For manufacturing of pesticides (e.g. cyhexatin)
