= Thomas Lumsden =

Scottish mathematician (1895–1944)

Thomas Arnot Lumsden
- Born: 19 September 1895; Edinburgh, Scotland
- Died: 17 August 1944 (aged 48); Killed in action during World War II
- Known for: Mathematician
- Spouse: Florence Milne Falconer
- Children: William Fairley Lumsden

Thomas Arnot Lumsden was a Scottish mathematician, who was educated at the University of Edinburgh, and lectured at Birmingham University. He published "A certain type of Fourier-Bessel Series", a paper about Bessel functions, in 1924. Lumsden, who served during both World War I (1914–1918) and World War II (1941–1945), was killed in action in 1944.

== Personal life, education, and World War I ==
Thomas Lumsden was born on 19 September 1895 in Edinburgh, to Mary Scott Arnott, who was born in Glasgow in 1857, and William Lumsden, a wood turner born in 1858 in Penicuik, Scotland. He had an older sister, Janet (1889-1935), and younger brother, Andrew (born in 1898).

Lumsden started studying at George Heriot's in 1906, a private school in Edinburgh. (Note: In April 1911, he passed the leaving certificate and the Edinburgh University Preliminary Examinations in Latin at the lower level, and English at the higher level. In April 1912, he passed Mathematics at Higher Level, then passed Dynamics and Science at Higher level in September 1912.) He matriculated at the University of Edinburgh in October 1912. (Note: Lumsden first studied Mathematics, Natural Philosophy and chemistry at Edinburgh University. Following that he studied Political economics before starting his honours course in Mathematics and Natural Philosophy in his 1914-1915 session. During this session, he was ranked second top student and awarded a First Class Certificate in the advanced honours class in Mathematics in June 1915.)

Lumsden took a break from his studies to fight in World War I where he was assigned to a Special Brigade of the Royal Engineers. He was a corporal from July 1915 to April 1917. Lumsden worked then in Munitions until December 1918. Lumsden was awarded a BSc in absentia on 5 July 1917. He returned from his service in 1918 to continue his studies at the University of Edinburgh, graduating with honours for his master's degree in 1919.

On 4 August 1924, Lumsden married Florence Milne Falconer in Abernyte, Perthshire. Their only child, William Fairly Lumsden was born on 6 February 1926. (Note: Thomas and Florence Lumsden are listed in the 1939 England and Wales register, Thomas' occupation is listed as "University lecturer mathematics", and their address is listed as Hallewell Road, which was the same address later as the residence of his wife when he died.)

== Career ==
Between 1919-1920, Lumsden remained at the University of Edinburgh as an Assistant in Natural Philosophy (under the Nichol Foundation). Following this, he moved to Birmingham to take a position as a lecturer in mathematics at University of Birmingham.

In 1922, he was elected as a Fellow of the Royal Astronomical Society. In 1922, Lumsden helped G. N. Watson, a mathematics professor at the University of Birmingham, publish a book on Bessel functions. Lumsden later published his own paper on Bessel functions in 1924, titled: "A certain type of Fourier-Bessel Series". This paper was cited in Thomas John I'Anson Bromwich's book, "An Introduction to The Theory of Infinite Series" in 1926.

== World War II ==
During World War II (1941–1945), Lumsden once again served his country. He arrived in New York City on the RMS Queen Elizabeth on 26 December 1942, intending to stay indefinitely, but no intention to become a citizen. He was identified as a government official and a diplomat.

Lumsden was killed in action on 17 August 1944.
