= Radon difluoride =

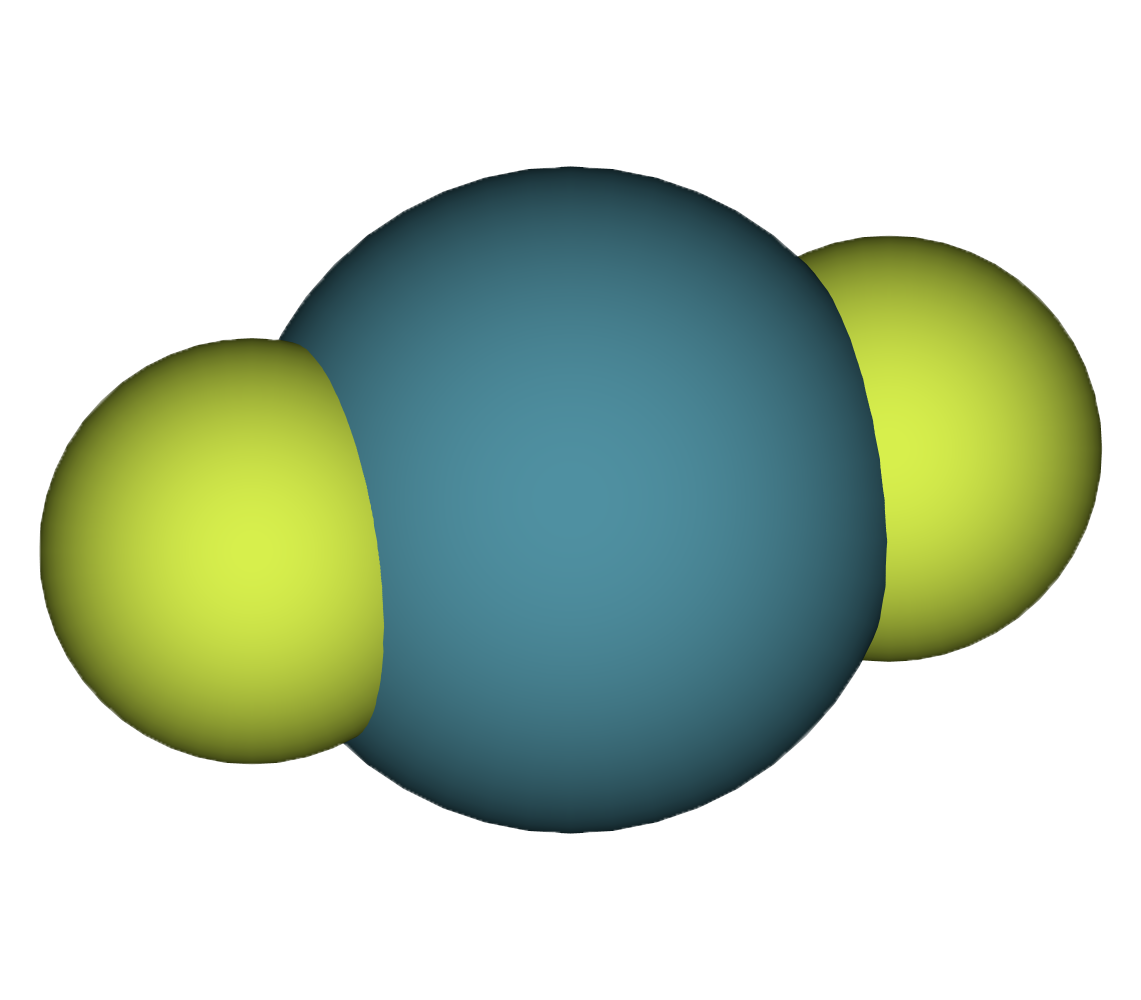

Names
- IUPAC name Radon difluoride
- Other names Radon(II) fluoride

Identifiers
CAS Number	18976-85-7
3D model (JSmol)	Interactive image
ChemSpider	95685049
CompTox Dashboard (EPA)	DTXSID901314916
- InChI: InChI=1S/F2Rn/c1-3-2 Key: UEHKUMAZJPZVMJ-UHFFFAOYSA-N
- SMILES: F[Rn]F

Properties
Chemical formula	RnF_{2}
- Except where otherwise noted, data are given for materials in their standard state (at 25 °C [77 °F], 100 kPa). verify (what is ?) Infobox references

Radon difluoride (RnF_{2}) is a compound of radon, a radioactive noble gas. Radon reacts readily with fluorine to form a solid compound, but this decomposes on attempted vaporization and its exact composition is uncertain. Calculations suggest that it may be ionic, unlike all other known binary noble gas compounds. The usefulness of radon compounds is limited because of the radioactivity of radon. The longest-lived isotope, radon-222, has a half-life of only 3.82 days, which decays by α-emission to yield polonium-218.

== Preparation ==
When radon is heated to 400 °C with fluorine, radon difluoride is formed.

== Reactions ==
Radon difluoride can be reduced to radon and hydrogen fluoride when heated with hydrogen gas at 500 °C.
