= Jonathan Stamler =

English-American physician and biochemist

Jonathan S. Stamler
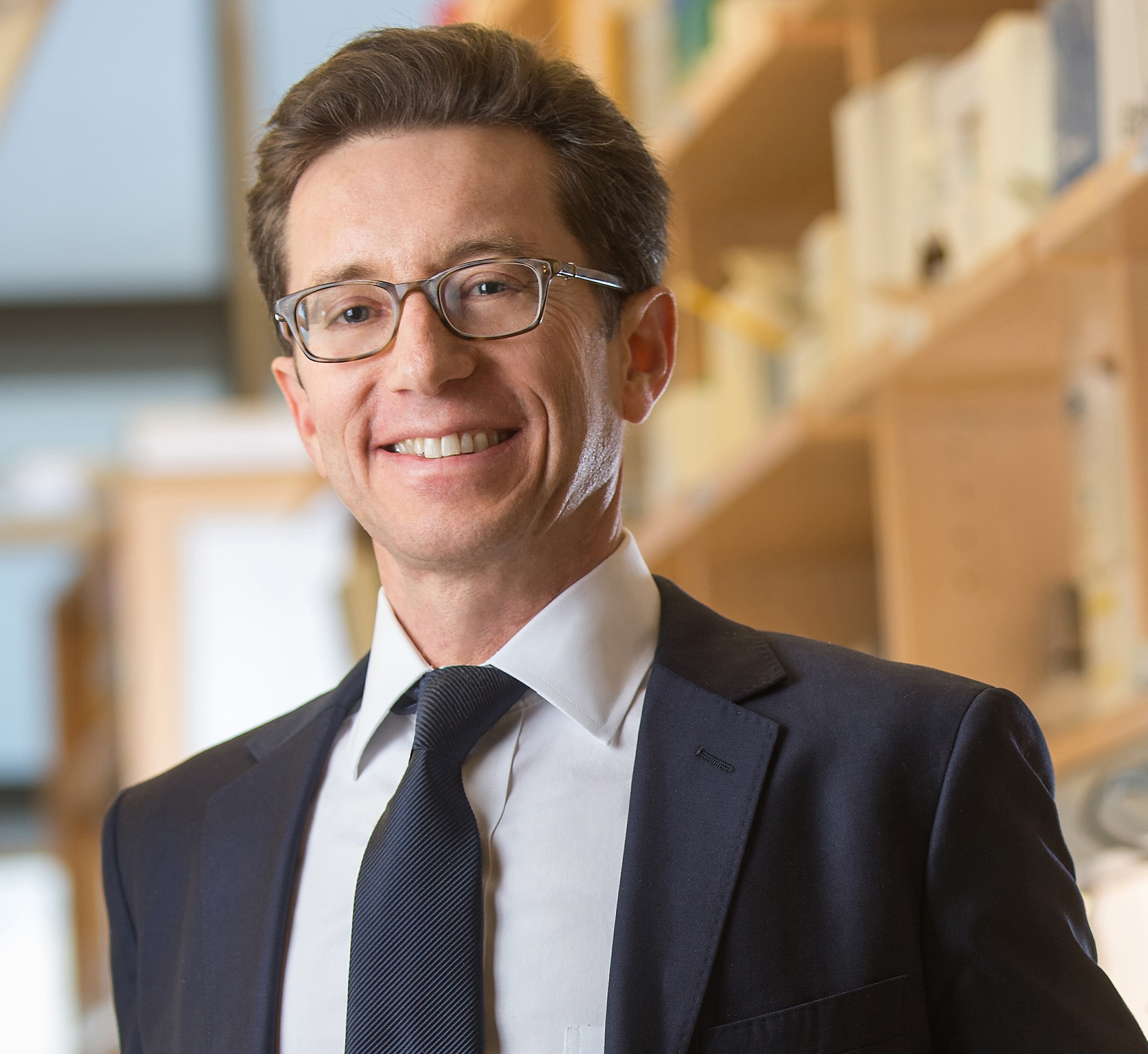
- Jonathan Stamler in his laboratory
- Born: Jonathan Solomon Stamler; June 23, 1959 (age 67); Wallingford, Oxfordshire, England
- Education: Brandeis University; Icahn School of Medicine at Mount Sinai
- Known for: Identification of S-nitrosylation as a protein post-translational modification, characterizing its regulatory enzymes, and defining its physiological and disease relevance
- Awards: Pew Scholar; HHMI Investigator; Outstanding Investigator Award in Basic Science (American Federation for Medical Research Foundation); Korsemyer Award (ASCI Award; finalist); Ewing Marion Kauffman Innovator; Coulter Translational Partnership Research Award; American Heart Association Distinguished Scientist Award
- Scientific career
- Fields: Biochemistry; Cardiology and Vascular biology; Redox biology
- Workplaces: Case Western Reserve University; Harrington Discovery Institute; University Hospitals Cleveland Medical Center; Duke University; Harvard University

Jonathan Solomon Stamler (born June 23, 1959) is an English-born American physician and scientist. He is known for his discovery of protein S-nitrosylation, the addition of a nitric oxide (NO) group to cysteine residues in proteins, as a ubiquitous cellular signal to regulate enzymatic activity and other key protein functions in bacteria, plants and animals, and particularly in transporting NO on cysteines in hemoglobin as the third gas in the respiratory cycle.

== Early life and education ==
Stamler was born in Wallingford, England on June 23, 1959 to a British father and American mother, and lived in multiple countries (United Kingdom, Switzerland, Israel, United States) as a youth due to his father's global career. He played on the Israeli national (under 18) tennis team.

He graduated with a bachelor's degree from Brandeis University in 1981, and earned his M.D. degree from Icahn School of Medicine at Mount Sinai in 1985. His residency and fellowship training in pulmonary medicine and in cardiovascular medicine was at Brigham and Women's Hospital at Harvard Medical School.

== Career and research ==
=== Academic appointments ===
Stamler was appointed assistant professor in medicine at Harvard Medical School in 1993, and associate professor then Professor in Medicine at Duke University School of Medicine in 1993 and 1996, respectively, with recognition as the George Barth Geller Professor for Research in Cardiovascular Diseases in 2004. He was an Investigator with the Howard Hughes Medical Institute from 1997 to 2005. In 2009, Stamler became Robert S. and Sylvia K. Reitman Family Foundation Distinguished Chair in Cardiovascular Innovation and Professor of Medicine, Professor of Biochemistry and founding Director of the Institute for Transformative Molecular Medicine at Case Western Reserve University School of Medicine and University Hospitals Cleveland Medical Center. In 2012, Stamler founded and became Director of the Harrington Discovery Institute at University Hospitals Cleveland Medical Center, and in 2016 was named Harrington Discovery Institute President.

=== Research ===
At the start of Stamler's research career, nitric oxide (NO) gas had recently been identified as a signaling molecule that mediated vasodilation by binding to the heme cofactor in the enzyme soluble guanylyl cyclase to produce cyclic guanosine monophosphate (cGMP). However, most actions of NO being discovered at that time were not mediated by guanylyl cyclase/cGMP, and high affinity binding of NO to the heme in red blood cell hemoglobin would inhibit NO actions in the vasculature, presenting a quandary.

Stamler would provide a general mechanism to explain NO function in biology, which requires redox-activation of NO to NO+ (nitrosonium ion) to allow its conjugation to all main classes of proteins, and would thereby establish the prototypic redox-based cellular signaling mechanism in biology. Redox activation of NO would also provide a chemical route to stabilize NO bioactivity and escape hemoglobin inactivation.

Specifically, Stamler recognized that NO can be redox-activated to bind cysteine residues in proteins and thiols in other molecules (e.g., glutathione, coenzyme A) to form S-nitrosothiols (SNOs) that are protected from heme inactivation thus providing a means to stabilize and regulate NO bioactivity, and he then identified the first endogenous SNOs. Stamler further demonstrated that SNO modification of proteins, which he coined 'S-nitrosylation' to denote a signaling function, can regulate enzyme activity by modifying active site or allosteric site cysteines. He and his colleagues would show that protein S-nitrosylation is widespread, regulating essentially all main classes of proteins: enzymes, globins, transcription factors, receptors, G proteins, protein kinases, ion channels and micro RNA processing machinery. That is, NO in the form of an SNO is a cellular signal that acts through post-translational modification of target proteins, akin to protein phosphorylation or ubiquitination. Approximately 10,000 proteins, at >20,000 sites, have been reported to be nitrosylated, and it has been predicted that 70% of the proteome is SNO-modified across phylogeny.

More recently, Stamler and coworkers have demonstrated that protein S-nitrosylation is enzymatic, entailing specific enzymes that convert NO to SNO (S-nitrosothiol synthases), transfer NO groups to specific residues in proteins (transnitrosylases), and remove specific SNO groups from proteins (protein denitrosylases). Enzymatic S-nitrosylation was identified first with hemoglobin (including nitrosylase and SNO synthase activities) and then later with multienzyme machinery in E. coli.

Stamler's studies have established physiological significance for protein S-nitrosylation in diverse cellular processes (receptor signaling, apoptosis, gene regulation, metabolism and immunity), and fundamental physiological functions (skeletal muscle contractility, airway tone, cardiac response to adrenergic stimulation, neuroprotection and development). He has also discovered novel cellular functions (red blood cell mediated vasodilation) and revealed a new physiological principle: NO carried by an invariant hemoglobin cysteine residue is essential for oxygen delivery to tissues through vasodilation of the microcirculation, redefining the respiratory cycle as a 3-gas system (O_{2}/NO/CO_{2}). The SNO-hemoglobin content of RBCs is low in multiple clinical conditions characterized by microvascular dysfunction and tissue hypoxia, including pulmonary hypertension, chronic obstructive pulmonary disease, peripheral arterial disease and sickle cell disease, thereby impairing vasodilation by RBCs. Further, since hemoglobin S-nitrosylation is rapidly lost upon blood storage, the oxygen delivery capability of transfused blood is impaired.

More broadly, accumulated evidence has demonstrated that S-nitrosylation of proteins plays important roles in many diseases, from heart failure to cancer to neurodegenerative disease. Stamler's studies have shown aberrant S-nitrosylation in asthma, pulmonary hypertension, heart failure, diabetes, kidney injury, and infectious diseases.

Examining the hemoglobins of microbes and the parasitic worm Ascaris, Stamler found that ancient forms of hemoglobin either eliminate NO enzymatically (bacteria and yeast) or utilize it to eliminate oxygen from its anaerobic environment (Ascaris), showing that the primordial function of hemoglobin was in NO processing not oxygen transport. Stamler also identified trans-kingdom SNO signaling (operating between species as a general language between microbiota and animal host), since microbiota that produce NO can lead to widespread protein S-nitrosylation in a Caenorhabditis elegans host with profound genetic and physiological consequences. Stamler also identified the enzymatic mechanism of nitroglycerin bioactivation and tolerance, thus solving a longstanding mystery (i.e., the generation of NO from nitroglycerin was awarded a Nobel Prize in 1998, but how was not understood).

=== Entrepreneurial and philanthropic activities ===
Stamler is a co-founder of multiple biotechnology companies, including several that have had public offerings, and he has also licensed additional discoveries to large pharma. He is also known for a track record of innovation and entrepreneurship as a founder of institutes, medical societies, innovation platforms and impact investment funds. His work has been covered in numerous lay publications, including the front page and science sections of the New York Times, as well as Time Magazine and The Economist, in books on the history of science and luck, and in works on outlier innovators.

Stamler is the founder the Harrington Project, a collaboration between the non-profit Harrington Discovery Institute at University Hospitals Health System in Cleveland, (where he serves as president) and two mission-aligned for-profit partner organizations (Biomotiv, Advent-Harrington Impact Fund) to shepherd laboratory discovery through translation and into biotechnology commercialization and approved therapy. Under Stamler's leadership, Harrington Discovery Institute has partnered with medical charities and non-profit organizations to target specific diseases, including the Foundation Fighting Blindness, Alzheimer's Drug Discovery Foundation, American Cancer Society, and University of Oxford (Oxford-Harrington Rare Disease Centre). He has built philanthropic partnerships with Morgan Stanley Wealth Management (Morgan Stanley GIFT Cures powered by Harrington Discovery Institute) and raised impact funds for investment companies (Biomotiv) and on Wall Street (Advent-Harrington Impact Fund with Advent Life Sciences; Morgan Stanley platform) that have totaled ~ $900 million for therapeutics research and development.
