= Rimini (disambiguation) =

Rimini is an Adriatic coast city in Italy, within the Province of Rimini.

Rimini may also refer to:

== Places ==
- Rimini, Montana, a ghost town in the U.S.
- Rimini, South Carolina, an unincorporated community in South Carolina, U.S.
- Roman Catholic Diocese of Rimini

== Music ==
- Rimini (album), by Fabrizio De André
- Rimini (film), 2022 film directed by Ulrich Seidl

== Other uses ==
- A.C. Rimini 1912, an Italian association football club
- Gregory of Rimini (c. 1300–1358), a scholastic philosopher
- "Rimini," a poem by Rudyard Kipling
- Rimini (film), a 2022 film

== See also ==
- Angeli–Rimini reaction
- La Spezia–Rimini Line
- Battle of Rimini (disambiguation)
- Remini
