= Nitrosation and nitrosylation =

Process of converting organic compounds into nitroso derivatives

Nitrosylation results in a molecule "R" adducted with the group N=O

Nitrosation and nitrosylation are two names for the process of converting organic compounds or metal complexes into nitroso derivatives, i.e., compounds containing the R−NO functionality. The synonymy arises because the R-NO functionality can be interpreted two different ways, depending on the physico-chemical environment:

- Nitrosylation interprets the process as adding a nitrosyl radical NO^{•}. Nitrosylation commonly occurs in the context of a metal (e.g. iron) or a thiol, leading to nitrosyl iron Fe−NO (e.g., in nitrosylated heme = nitrosylheme) or S-nitrosothiols (RSNOs).
- Nitrosation interprets the process as adding a nitrosonium ion NO^{+}. Nitrosation commonly occurs with amines (–NH_{2}), leading to a nitrosamine.

There are multiple chemical mechanisms by which this can be achieved, including enzymes and chemical synthesis.

== In biochemistry ==
The biological functions of nitric oxide include S-nitrosylation, the conjugation of NO to cysteine thiols in proteins, which is an important part of cell signalling.

== Organic synthesis ==
Nitrosation is typically performed with nitrous acid, formed from acidification of a sodium nitrite solution. Nitrous acid is unstable, and high yields require a rapid reaction rate. NO^{+} synthon transfer is catalyzed by a strong nucleophile, such as (in order of increasing efficacy) chloride, bromide, thiocyanate, or thiourea. Indeed, (meta)stable nitrosation products (alkyl nitrites or nitrosamines) can also nitrosate under such conditions; and the equilibria can be driven in any desired direction. Absent a driving force, thionitrosos form out of nitrosamines, which form out of nitrite esters, which form out of nitrous acid.

Some form of Lewis acid also enhances the electrophilicity of NO^{+} carriers, but the acid need not be Brønsted: nitroprusside, for example, nitrosates best in neutral-to-basic conditions. Roussin's salts may react similarly, but it is unclear if they release NO^{+} or NO^{•}.

In general, nitric oxide is a poor nitrosant, Traube-type reactions notwithstanding. But atmospheric oxygen can oxidize nitric oxide to nitrogen dioxide, which does nitrosate. Alternatively cupric ions catalyze disproportionation into NO^{+} and NO^{−}.

=== On the carbon skeleton ===
Nitroso compounds, such as nitrosobenzene, are typically prepared by oxidation of hydroxylamines:

RNHOH + [O] → RNO + H_{2}O

In principle, NO^{+} can substitute directly onto an aromatic ring, but the ring must be substantially activated, because NO^{+} is about 14 bel less electrophilic than NO^{+}_{2}. Unusually for electrophilic aromatic substitution, proton release to the solvent is typically rate-limiting, and the reaction can be suppressed in superacidic conditions.

Excess NO^{+} typically oxidizes the initially-nitroso product to a nitro compound or diazonium salt.

=== Of chalcogen heteroatoms ===
S-nitrosothiols are typically prepared by condensation of a thiol and nitrous acid:

RSH + HONO → RSNO + H_{2}O

They are liable to disproportionate to the disulfide and nitrogen oxides.

Although such cations have not been isolated, nitrosating reagents likely coordinate to sulfides with no hydrogen substituent.

Sulfinates and sulfinic acids add twice to nitrous acid, so that the initial nitroso product (from the first addition) is reduced to a disulfonyl hydroxylamine. A variant on this process with bisulfite is Raschig's hydroxylamine production technique.

O-Nitroso compounds are similar to S-nitroso compounds, but are less reactive because the oxygen atom is less nucleophilic than the sulfur atom. The formation of an alkyl nitrite from an alcohol and nitrous acid is a common example:

ROH + HONO → RONO + H_{2}O

=== Of amines ===
Nitrosation of aniline

N-Nitrosamines arise from the reaction of nitrite sources with amino compounds. Typically, this reaction occurs when the nucleophilic nitrogen of a secondary amine attacks the nitrogen of the electrophilic nitrosonium ion:

NO_{2}^{−} + 2 H^{+} → NO^{+} + H_{2}O
R_{2}NH + NO^{+} → R_{2}N-NO + H^{+}

If the amine is secondary, then the product is stable, but primary amines decompose in acid to the corresponding diazonium cation, and then attack any nearby nucleophile. Nitrosation of a primary amine is thus sometimes referred to as deamination.

The stable secondary nitrosamines are carcinogens in rodents. The compounds are believed to nitrosate primary amines during the acid environment of the stomach, and the resulting diazonium ions alkylate DNA, leading to cancer.
