= Blood Reviews =

- Discipline: Hematology
- Language: English
- Edited by: Hillard Lazarus, Drew Provan

Publication details
- History: 1987–present
- Publisher: Elsevier
- Frequency: Quarterly
- Impact factor: 6.600 (2017)

Standard abbreviations
- ISO 4: Blood Rev.

Indexing
- CODEN: BLOREB
- ISSN: 0268-960X (print); 1532-1681 (web)
- LCCN: sn87026331
- OCLC no.: 936510976

Links
- Journal homepage; Online access; Online archive

Blood Reviews is a quarterly peer-reviewed medical journal that publishes review articles in the field of hematology. It was established in 1987 and is published by Elsevier. The editors-in-chief are Hillard Lazarus (University Hospitals Case Medical Center) and Drew Provan (Royal London Hospital). According to the Journal Citation Reports, the journal has a 2017 impact factor of 6.600.
