= S-Nitroso-N-acetylpenicillamine =

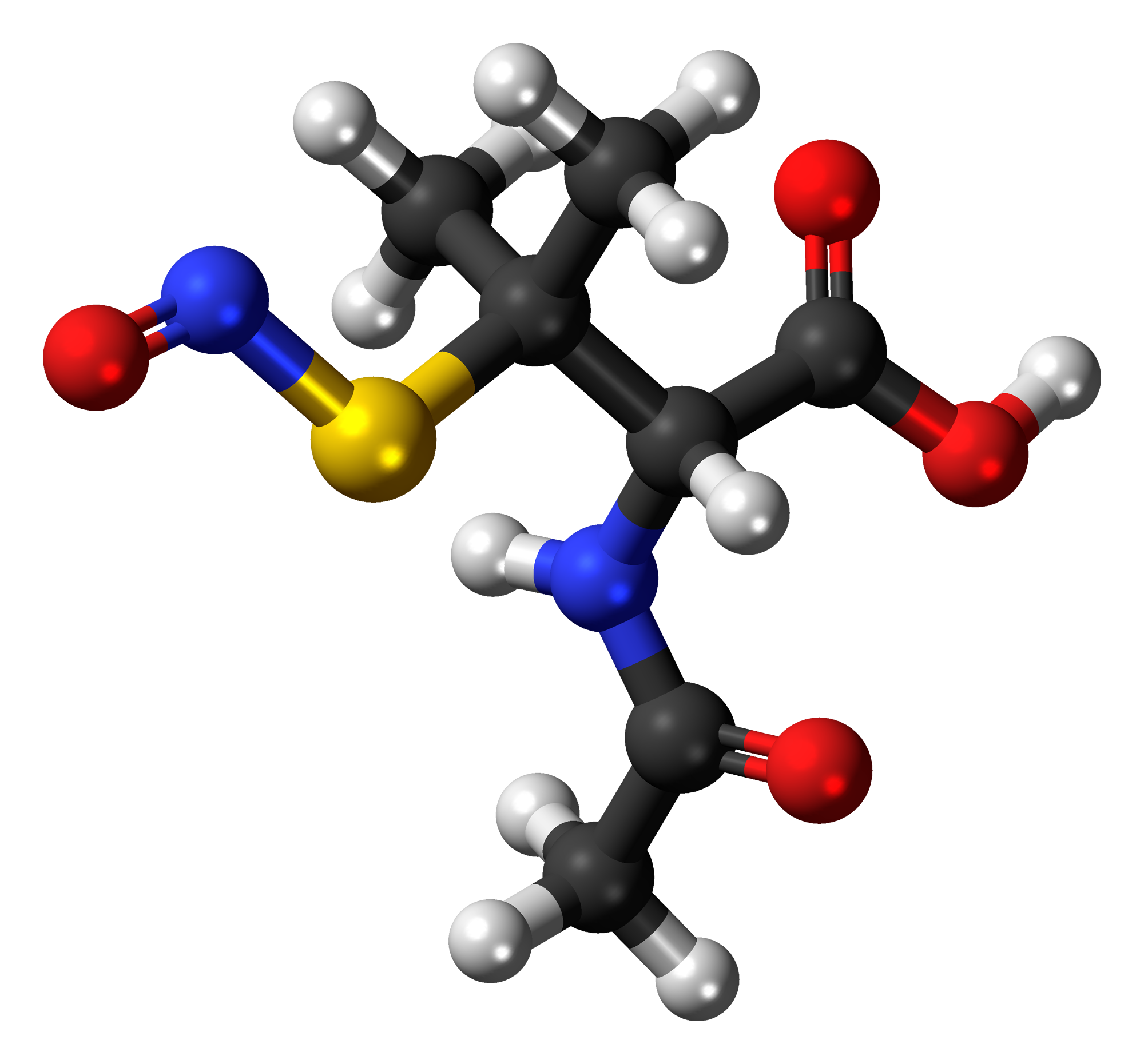

Names
- IUPAC name S-Nitroso-N-acetylpenicillamine
- Other names N-Acetyl-3-(nitrosothio)-DL-valine; S-Nitroso-N-acetylpenicillamine

Identifiers
CAS Number	79032-48-7
3D model (JSmol)	Interactive image
Abbreviations	SNAP
ChEBI	CHEBI:77702
ChEMBL	ChEMBL73188
ChemSpider	5036251
PubChem CID	6603945
UNII	6E47VKF8B8
CompTox Dashboard (EPA)	DTXSID80897531
- InChI: InChI=1S/C7H12N2O4S/c1-4(10)8-5(6(11)12)7(2,3)14-9-13/h5H,1-3H3,(H,8,10)(H,11,12)/t5-/m0/s1 Key: ZIIQCSMRQKCOCT-YFKPBYRVSA-N; InChI=1/C7H12N2O4S/c1-4(10)8-5(6(11)12)7(2,3)14-9-13/h5H,1-3H3,(H,8,10)(H,11,12)/t5-/m0/s1 Key: ZIIQCSMRQKCOCT-YFKPBYRVBE
- SMILES: O=C(N[C@@H](C(=O)O)C(SN=O)(C)C)C

Properties
Chemical formula	C_{7}H_{12}N_{2}O_{4}S
Molar mass	220.25 g/mol
Appearance	green solid

Hazards
- GHS labelling
Pictograms	(GHS07: Exclamation mark)
Signal word	Warning
Hazard statements	H315, H319, H335
Precautionary statements	P261, P264, P271, P280, P302+P352, P305+P351+P338
- Except where otherwise noted, data are given for materials in their standard state (at 25 °C [77 °F], 100 kPa). verify (what is ?) Infobox references

S-Nitroso-N-acetylpenicillamine (SNAP) is the organosulfur compound with the formula ONSC(CH_{3})_{2}CH(NHAc)CO_{2}H. It is a green solid.

SNAP is an S-nitrosothiol and is used as a model for the general class of S-nitrosothiols which have received much attention in biochemistry because nitric oxide and some organic nitroso derivatives serve as signaling molecules in living systems, especially related to vasodilation. SNAP is derived from the amino acid penicillamine. S-Nitrosoglutathione is a related agent.
