= Baudisch reaction =

Chemical reaction

Baudish reaction
| Named after | Oskar Baudisch |
| Reaction type | Substitution reaction |

Identifiers
| RSC ontology ID | RXNO:0000483 |

In organic chemistry, the Baudisch reaction is a process for the synthesis of nitrosophenols using metal ions. Although the products are of limited value, the reaction is of historical interest as an example of metal-promoted functionalization of aromatic substrates.

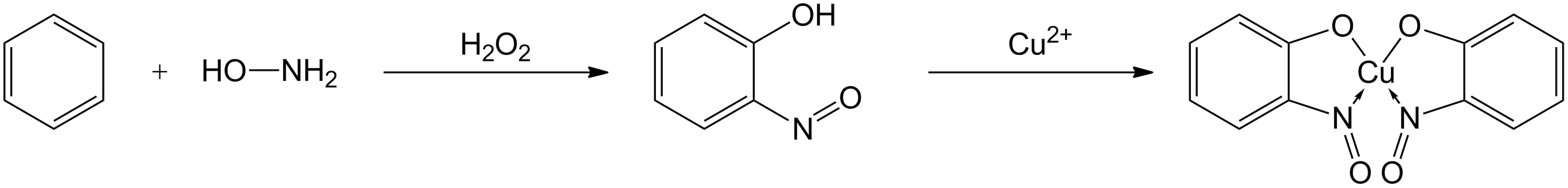
Baudischreaction

== History and Mechanism ==
As described originally by Oskar Baudisch in 1939 and further developed by his colleague Cronheim in 1947, benzene, hydroxylamine, and hydrogen peroxide are combined. Baudisch proposed that the reaction proceeds first via the formation of nitroxyl (HN=O), by the oxidation of hydroxylamine hydrochloride with hydrogen peroxide, possibly catalysed by the cupric ions.

This can also be achieved by the reduction of nitrous acid with cuprous ions or by the action of cuprous ions and hydrogen peroxide on Piloty's acid. The nitroxyl (HN=O) then attacks the aromatic ring, giving a nitroso-cyclohexadiene which is rapidly hydroxylated before being oxidised by the peroxide to give the o-nitrosophenol as a copper coordination complex.

Conceptually similar work had been performed earlier, in the form of Millon's reagent.

=== Revisions to the mechanism ===
In years following the work Baudisch and Cronheim did, Konecny and Marayuma et al. suggested possible mechanisms for the Baudisch reaction. Konecny proposed that instead of the nitroso group adding first followed by the addition of a hydroxyl group as Baudisch predicted, the OH group added first through a similar radical mechanism with the hydroxyl radical coming from Hydrogen Peroxide after which the nitroso group is added by nitrous acid which he proposed was an intermediate under the reaction conditions. Marayuma et al. pointed some flaws in Konecny's proposal. They maintained that the nitrosation of a phenol (as Konecny's mechanism posed) through the intermediate nitrous acid was impossible under the reaction conditions because it would involve an ortho substitution of a phenol which is thermodynamically unfavorable which was the reason Konecny observed very low percent yields.

== Properties of o-nitrosophenols ==
Free nitrosophenols are readily oxidized in air, forming nitrophenols, or catechol and nitrite under more aggressive conditions. This makes them very difficult to handle in the absence of stabilization provided by the transition metal. Their metal complexes are deeply colored and water-soluble.

| Metal ion | Color of dilute solution |
|---|---|
| Copper | Reddish Violet |
| Mercury | Reddish Violet |
| Nickel | Red |
| Iron (II) | Green |
| Cobalt | Grayish Violet |
| Palladium | Green |
| Zinc | Pink |
| Lead | Pink |
| Iron (III) | Brown |
| Uranium | Reddish |

They undergo a keto-enol tautomerization in the presence of water. The keto form is called o-quinonemonoxime.

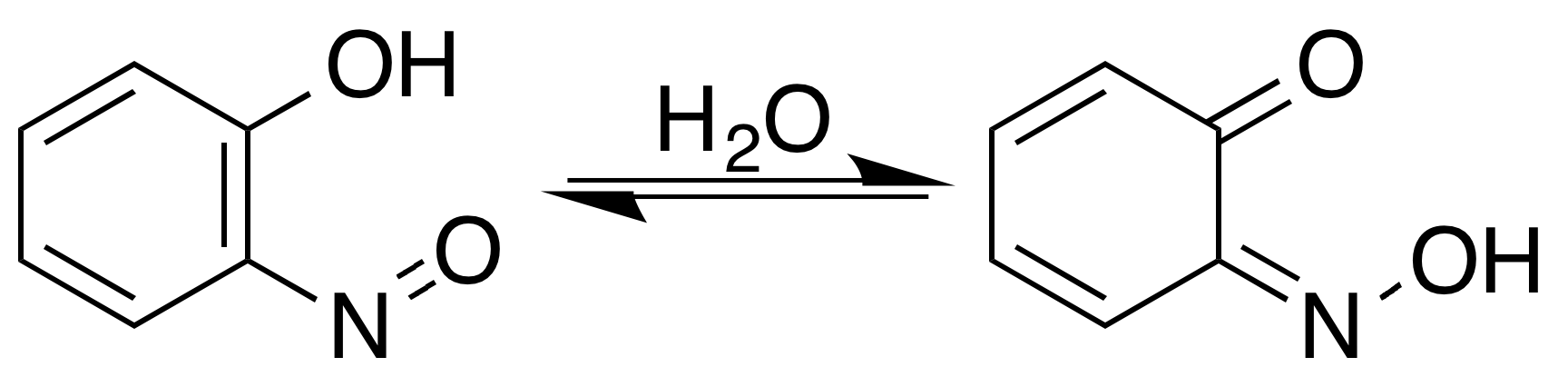

== Substituted o-nitrosophenols ==
The Baudisch reaction is more profitably applied to substituted aromatic substrates, especially phenols. In these cases the NO group is introduced at the position ortho to the OH group. Nitrosylation using conventional electrophilic aromatic substitution occurs para to the OH group. In the Baudisch reaction, the transition metal ion directs the substitution. The metal ion binds the nitrosyl group and phenoxy oxygen, directing the reaction to occur ortho instead.

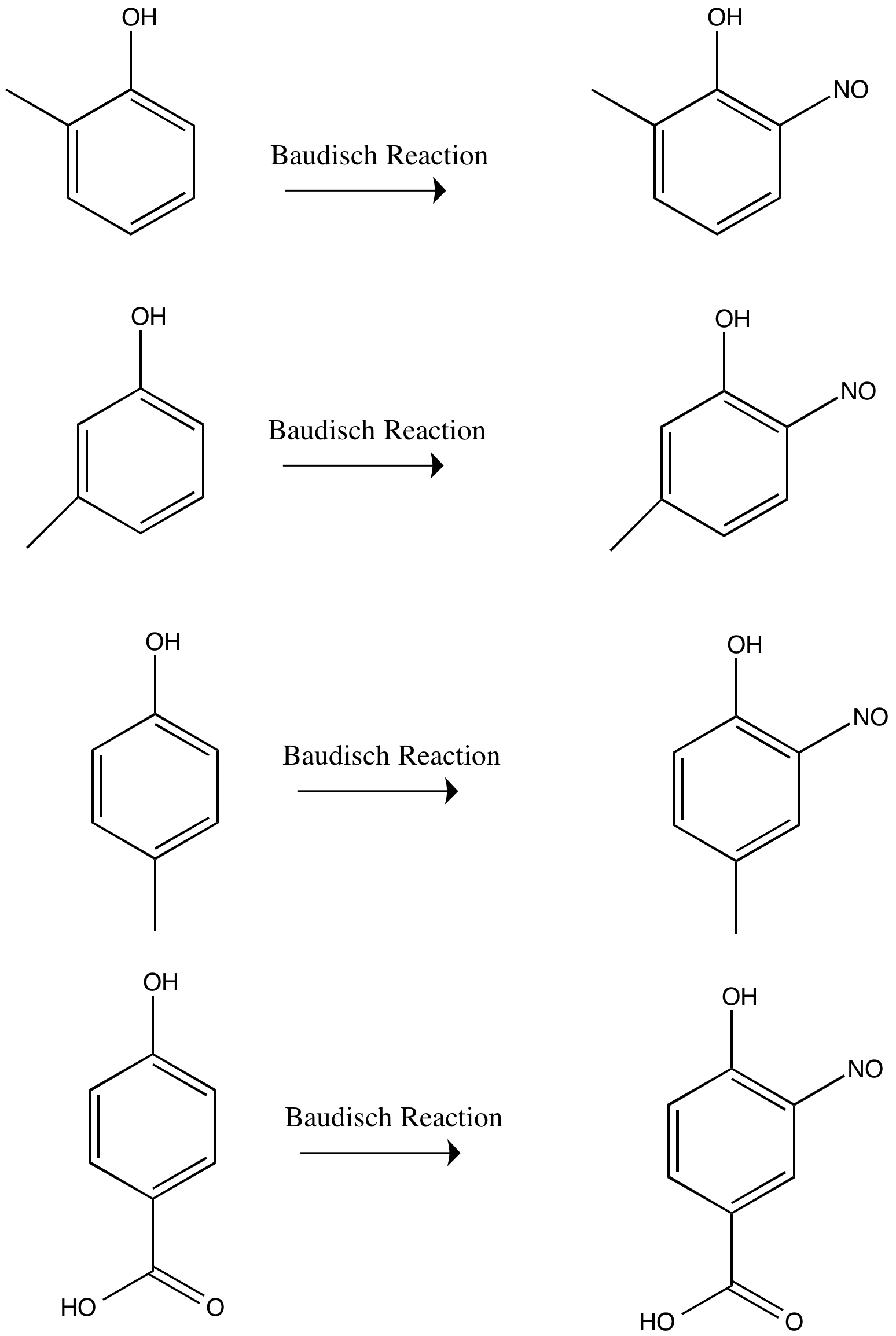

For non-phenolic substrates, nitrosylation generally first, and according to usual electrophilic aromatic substitution selectivity. Hydroxylation the occurs ortho to the nitroso group due to the directing effect of the metal.

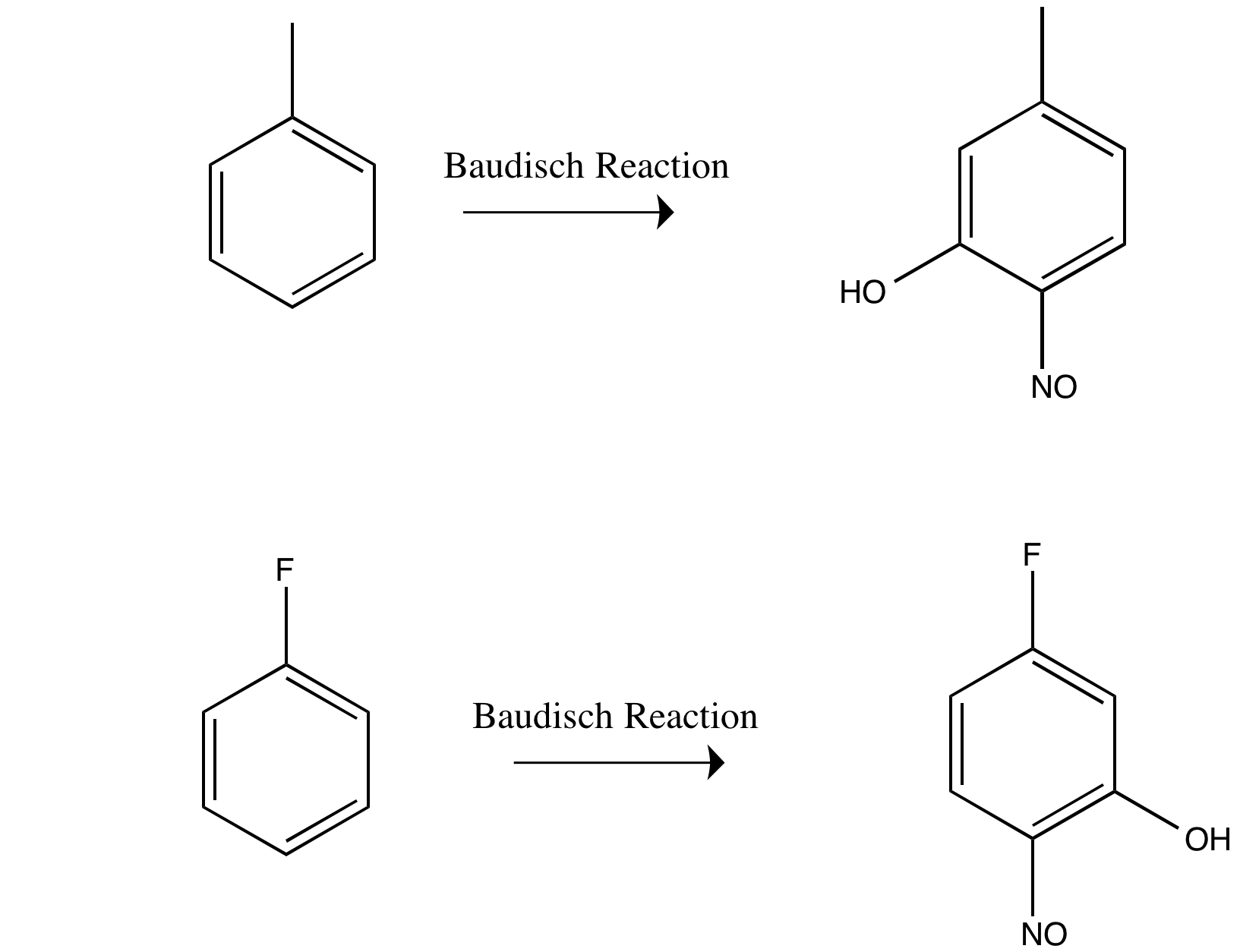

Of the benzene derivatives that do not undergo the Baudisch reaction, aromatic aldehydes tend to form hydroxamic acid or oximes. Aniline derivatives are converted to a diazo compounds.
