= S-Nitrosothiol =

Organic compounds or groups of the form –S–N=O

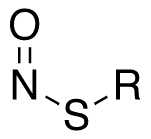
Structure of an S–nitrosothiol. R denotes some organic group.

In organic chemistry, S-nitrosothiols, also known as thionitrites, are organic compounds or functional groups containing a nitroso group attached to the sulfur atom of a thiol. They are esters the thionitrous acid (HSNO) and have the general formula R−S−N=O, where R denotes an organic group. Inorganic compounds containing the thionitrite anion are also known.

In biochemistry, S-nitrosothiols serve as donors of both the nitrosonium ion NO^{+} and of nitric oxide. They are agents that enable NO-based signaling in living systems, especially related to vasodilation. Red blood cells, for instance, carry an essential reservoir of S-nitrosohemoglobin and release S-nitrosothiols into the bloodstream under low-oxygen conditions, causing the blood vessels to dilate.

== In biochemistry ==
S-Nitrosoglutathione

Originally suggested by Ignarro to serve as intermediates in the action of organic nitrates, endogenous S-nitrosothiols were discovered by Stamler and colleagues (S-nitrosoalbumin in plasma and S-nitrosoglutathione in airway lining fluid) and shown to represent a main source of NO bioactivity in vivo. More recently, S-nitrosothiols have been implicated as primary mediators of protein S-nitrosylation, the oxidative modification of cysteine thiol that provides ubiquitous regulation of protein function.

== Structure ==
The prefix "S" indicates that the NO group is attached to sulfur. The S-N-O angle is near 114°. The nitrogen bears a lone pair of electrons. The S-N distance is long as verified by X-ray crystallography on S-nitrosotriphenylmethanethiol. The implied weak S-N bond is conducive to its scission.

== Preparation and formation ==
S-Nitrosothiols may arise from condensation from nitrous acid and a thiol:

RSH + HONO → RSNO + H_{2}O

Other nitrosating agents, such as N_{2}O_{3} and ’’tert’’-butyl nitrite (tBuONO), are also commonly used.

== Reactions ==
Most nitrosothiols are thermally unstable with respect to formation of the disulfide and nitric oxide:

2 RSNO → RSSR + 2 NO

That equation reverses under irradiation. Nitrosothiols also nitrosate amines:

4 RSNO + 2R′_{2}NH → 2 R′_{2}NNO + 2 (RS)_{2} + N_{2}O + H_{2}O

S-Nitrosothiols undergo hydrolysis to nitrous acid (a source of NO^{+}) upon treatment with aqueous acids:

RSNO + H_{2}O ⇌ RSH + HNO_{2}

and they can transfer nitroso groups to other nucleophiles, including other thiols:

RSNO + R'SH → RSH + R'SNO

These reactions can be rapid. In the Saville reaction, mercury replaces the nitrosonium ion:

RSNO + Hg^{2+} → RSHg^{+} + NO^{+}

== Detection ==
S-nitrosothiols are brightly colored. S-Nitrosothiols can be detected with UV-vis spectroscopy.

== Examples ==
- S-Nitrosoglutathione (GSNO)
- S-Nitroso-N-acetylpenicillamine (SNAP)
- S-Nitrosotriphenylmethanethiol
