= Triphenylmethanethiol =

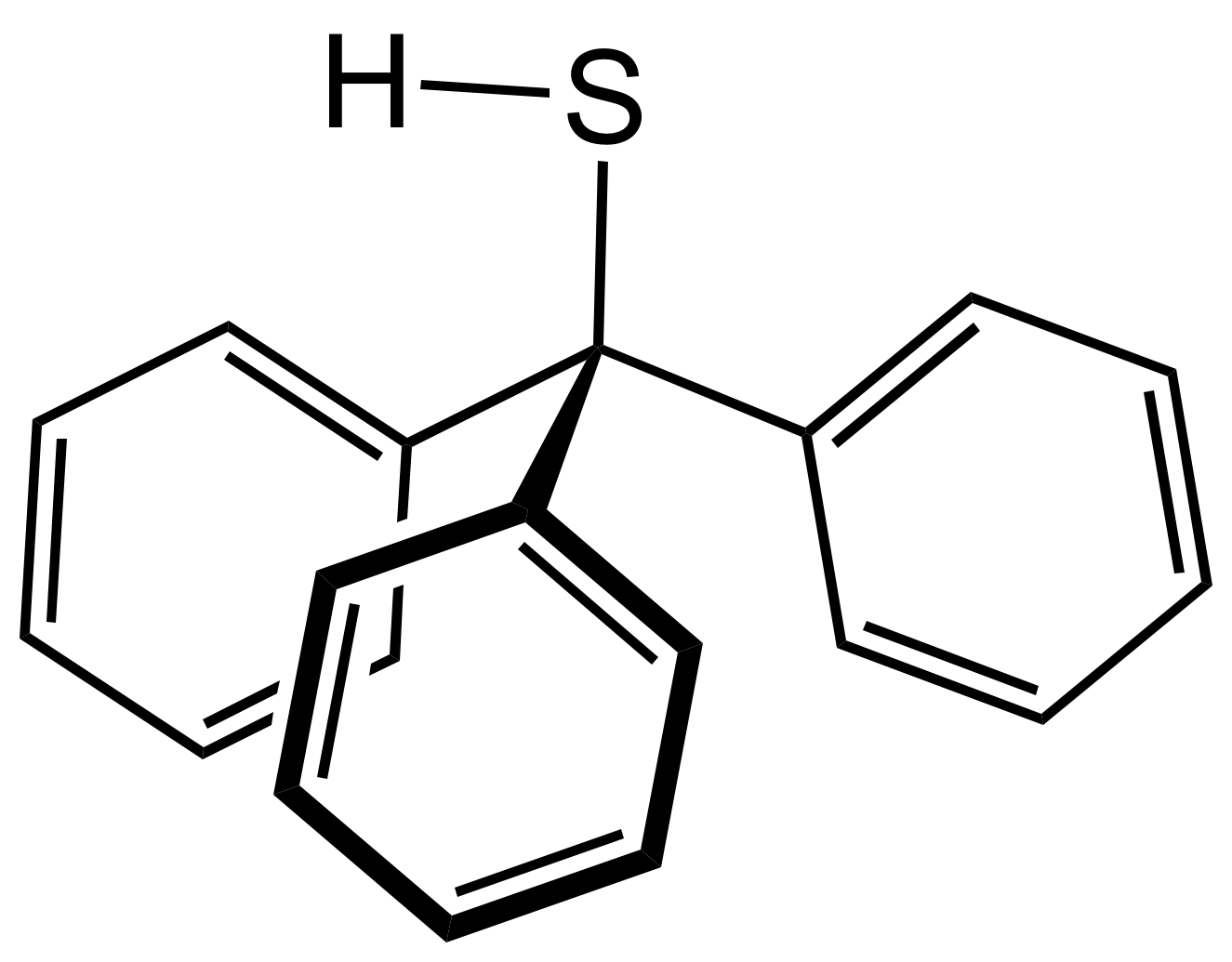

Names
- Preferred IUPAC name Triphenylmethanethiol
- Other names Trityl mercaptan

Identifiers
CAS Number	3695-77-0
3D model (JSmol)	Interactive image
ChemSpider	69703
ECHA InfoCard	100.020.928
EC Number	223-020-3
PubChem CID	77281
UNII	T7AQN86QSJ
CompTox Dashboard (EPA)	DTXSID1063142
- InChI: InChI=1S/C19H16S/c20-19(16-10-4-1-5-11-16,17-12-6-2-7-13-17)18-14-8-3-9-15-18/h1-15,20H Key: JQZIKLPHXXBMCA-UHFFFAOYSA-N
- SMILES: C1=CC=C(C=C1)C(C2=CC=CC=C2)(C3=CC=CC=C3)S

Properties
Chemical formula	C_{19}H_{16}S
Molar mass	276.40 g·mol^{−1}
Appearance	yellow solid
Melting point	103–107 °C (217–225 °F; 376–380 K)

Hazards
- GHS labelling
Pictograms	(GHS07: Exclamation mark)
Signal word	Warning
Hazard statements	H315, H319, H332
Precautionary statements	P261, P264, P271, P280, P302+P352, P304+P312, P304+P340, P305+P351+P338, P312, P321, P332+P313, P337+P313, P362
- Except where otherwise noted, data are given for materials in their standard state (at 25 °C [77 °F], 100 kPa). Infobox references

Triphenylmethanethiol is an organosulfur compound with the formula (C_{6}H_{5})_{3}CSH. It is the thiol derivative of the bulky substituent triphenylmethyl (called trityl).

The compound forms a number of unusual derivatives that are more stable than less bulky analogues. The sulfenyl chloride (C_{6}H_{5})_{3}CSCl is obtained from the thiol with sulfuryl chloride. It in turn reacts with ammonia to form the sulfenamide (C_{6}H_{5})_{3}CSNH_{2}. The thiol reacts with nitrous acid to give S-nitrosotriphenylmethanethiol (C_{6}H_{5})_{3}CSNO.
