= Angelo Angeli =

Italian chemist (1864–1931)

- Born: 20 August 1864; Tarcento, Austrian Empire
- Died: 31 May 1931 (aged 66); Florence, Kingdom of Italy
- Known for: Angeli-Rimini reaction
- Scientific career
- Workplaces: University of Florence

Angelo Angeli (20 August 1864 – 31 May 1931) was an Italian chemist. Angeli's salt and the Angeli–Rimini reaction are named after him.

== Scientific career ==
Angeli studied in Padua, where he met the chemist Giacomo Luigi Ciamician. When Ciamician moved to a new appointment in Bologna, he chose Angeli to work as his assistant, even before Angeli had graduated. In 1891, Angeli was awarded his doctorate in chemistry at Bologna. In 1893, he became a lecturer in Bologna, and in 1895, he became a professor. In 1894, he worked briefly in Munich with Adolf von Baeyer, learning medicinal chemistry. In 1897, he moved to the University of Palermo where he became Professor of Pharmaceutical Chemistry.

In 1913, Angeli became director of the Pharmacy School in Florence. In 1915, he became Professor of Organic Chemistry at the University of Florence (Istituto di Studi Superiori), a position that was created specifically for him.

Angeli focused on nitrogen compounds. He investigated the structure of hydrazoic acid, synthesised nitrohydroxylamine (1894), and discovered the nitroxyl radical. The Angeli-Rimini reaction (1896) for the detection of aldehydes was named after him and his student Enrico Rimini. He discovered sodium trioxodinitrate, which is known as Angeli's salt. He confirmed the structure of the camphor which had been by proposed by Julius Bredt in 1893.

He was a member of the Accademia dei Lincei, the Royal Society of Sciences in Uppsala (1919) and the Bavarian Academy of Sciences (1928) and an honorary member of the German Chemical Society.
