= Thionitrite =

Identifiers
3D model (JSmol)	Interactive image
PubChem CID	15388577
- InChI: InChI=1S/HNOS/c2-1-3/h(H,2,3)/p-1 Key: ICRHORQIUXBEPA-UHFFFAOYSA-M
- SMILES: N(=O)[S-]

Properties
Chemical formula	NOS^{−}
Molar mass	62.07 g·mol^{−1}
Appearance	Green
- Except where otherwise noted, data are given for materials in their standard state (at 25 °C [77 °F], 100 kPa). Infobox references

Thionitrite is the inorganic anion O=N-S^{−} which is the conjugate base of thionitrous acid. It is, loosely speaking, a member of a family of the sulfur nitrides. Organic thionitrites, having a group covalently bonded to the sulfur, are called "S-nitrosothiols".

The structure of the thionitrite anion resembles that of nitrite, having a bent geometry. The angle at nitrogen is 120°. The nitrogen–oxygen bond length of 1.21 Å and nitrogen–sulfur bond length of 1.70 Å suggest that the major electronic nature is an N=O double bond and an N–S single bond.

Stable salts have been obtained with bulky cations. One synthesis involved the reaction of PPN nitrite with octasulfur in acetone, which gives the persulfide:

NO^{−}_{2} + 3S → ONSS^{−} + "SO"

The persulfide is then converted to the thionitrite using triphenylphosphine:

ONSS^{−} + (C_{6}H_{5})_{3}P → ONS^{−} + (C_{6}H_{5})_{3}PS
