= University Hospitals Ahuja Medical Center =

Coordinates: 41°27′08″N 81°29′41″W

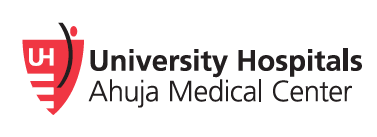

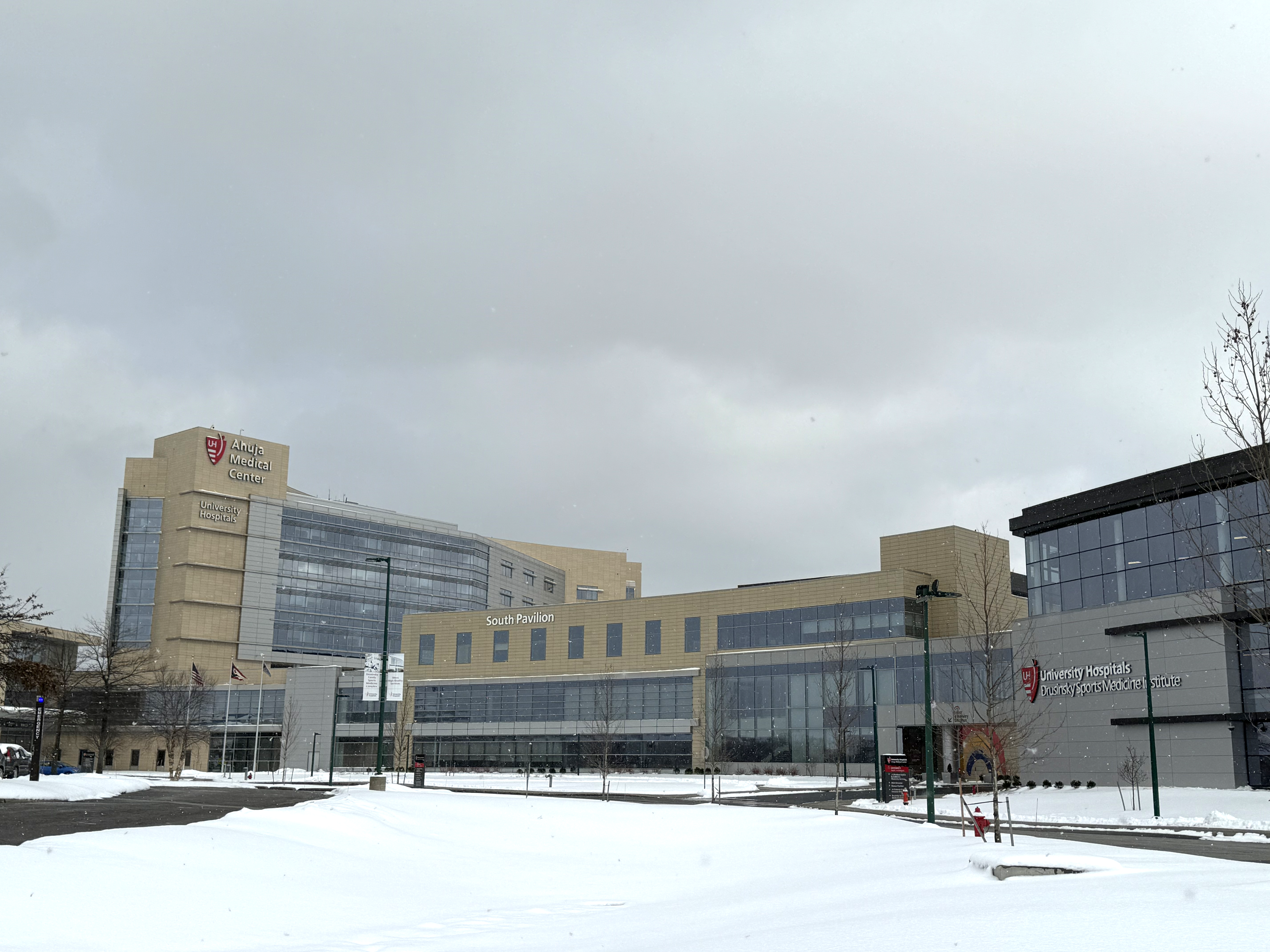

Geography
- Location: Beachwood, Ohio, United States

Organization
- Care system: Private
- Type: Community
- Network: University Hospitals Health System

Services
- Beds: 193

History
- Opened: 2011

Links
- Website: https://www.uhahuja.org
- Lists: Hospitals in Ohio
- Other links: List of hospitals in the United States

University Hospitals Ahuja Medical Center (UH Ahuja) is a community Hospital in Beachwood, Ohio and opened in 2011. It services more than 540,000 residents in the Cleveland area. It is named in honor of University Hospitals Board Chairman Monte Ahuja, his wife Usha, and their family who donated $30 million towards Vision 2010: The UH Difference.

== Hospital design ==
The UH Ahuja Medical Center will house seven floors of outpatient, inpatient, and emergency services as well as a medical office building. Throughout those floors, Wireless technology and diagnostic services will be used to increase efficiency and patient safety. All public circulation is organized to the front of the house. Visitors are also able to see exactly where the parking lot and entrance are correctly positioned in order to reduce stress and anxiety.

The curved shape of the building and floor plan layout is designed to separate services from the traditional core of traffic as well as minimize travel distances for doctors, nurses, and staff. These initiatives will improve access to critical resources all while enhancing patient safety.

=== Environmentally respective technology ===
Designers considered the environment in every aspect of the facility. Among some of those features, the UH Ahuja Medical Center is organized to maximize the use of natural light—enhancing energy efficiency.

The natural landscaping also uses native plants and materials which further conserves resources by requiring less maintenance and water. As part of a recycling initiative, the development uses bio-swales—landscape elements designed to remove silt and pollution from surface runoff water to filter, collect and redistribute water back into the site.

== Patient-centered care ==
The UH Ahuja Medical Center will house 144 beds in its initial phase, ultimately growing to 600 beds in three phases. Inpatient rooms are acuity adaptable, minimizing the need to transfer and transport patients.

== Facilities and Services ==
- Breast Health
- Digestive Health
- Heart & Vascular
- Laboratory Services
- Men's Health
- Orthopedics
- Imaging & Radiology
- Spine
- Sports Medicine
- Women & new Born care

== See also ==
- University Hospitals
