= S-Nitrosylation =

Post-translational modification

In biochemistry, S-nitrosylation or S-nitrosation is the covalent attachment of a nitric oxide group (−NO) to a thiol on a cysteine within a protein to form an S-nitrosothiol (SNO). S-Nitrosylation has diverse regulatory roles in bacteria, yeast and plants, and in all cells in mammals. It thus operates as a fundamental mechanism for cellular signaling across phylogeny and accounts for the large part of NO bioactivity.

'‘’S’’-Nitrosylation is targeted, reversible and associated with several cellular responses. including the prototypic example of red blood cell mediated autoregulation of blood flow that is essential for vertebrate life. Although originally thought to involve multiple chemical routes in vivo, accumulating evidence suggests that S-nitrosylation depends on enzymatic activity, entailing three classes of enzymes (S-nitrosylases) that operate in concert to conjugate NO to proteins, drawing analogy to ubiquitinylation. Besides enzymatic activity, hydrophobicity and low pK_{a} values also play a key role in regulating the process.S-Nitrosylation was first described by Stamler et al. and proposed as a general mechanism for control of protein function, including examples of both active and allosteric regulation of proteins by endogenous and exogenous sources of NO. The redox-based chemical mechanisms for S-nitrosylation in biological systems were also described concomitantly. Important examples of proteins whose activities were subsequently shown to be regulated by S-nitrosylation include the NMDA-type glutamate receptor in the brain. Aberrant S-nitrosylation following stimulation of the NMDA receptor would come to serve as a prototypic example of the involvement of S-nitrosylation in disease. S-Nitrosylation similarly contributes to physiology and dysfunction of cardiac, airway and skeletal muscle and the immune system, reflecting wide-ranging functions in cells and tissues. It is estimated that ~70% of the proteome is subject to S-nitrosylation and the majority of those sites are conserved. S-Nitrosylation is thus established as ubiquitous in biology, having been demonstrated to occur in all phylogenetic kingdoms and has been described as the prototypic redox-based signalling mechanism.

== Denitrosylation ==
The reverse of S-nitrosylation is denitrosylation, principally an enzymically controlled process. Multiple enzymes have been described to date, which fall into two main classes mediating denitrosylation of protein and low molecular weight SNOs, respectively. S-Nitrosoglutathione reductase (GSNOR) is exemplary of the low molecular weight class; it accelerates the decomposition of S-nitrosoglutathione (GSNO) and of SNO-proteins in equilibrium with GSNO. The enzyme is highly conserved from bacteria to humans. Thioredoxin (Trx)-related proteins, including Trx1 and 2 in mammals, catalyze the direct denitrosylation of S-nitrosoproteins (in addition to their role in transnitrosylation). Aberrant S-nitrosylation (and denitrosylation) has been implicated in multiple diseases, including heart disease, cancer and asthma as well as neurological disorders, including stroke, chronic degenerative diseases (e.g., Parkinson's and Alzheimer's disease) and amyotrophic lateral sclerosis (ALS). Reaction with endogenous hydropersulfides is a proposed mechanism for non-enzymatic denitrosylation with release of nitric oxide.

== Transnitrosylation ==
Transnitrosylation involves the transfer of an NO moiety from RSNO to another thiol:

RSNO + R'SH → RSH + R'SNO

Transnitrosylation between thioredoxin (Trx) and caspase 3 helps regulate cell death. Deoxygenated SNO-hemoglobin transfers its NO group to the membrane protein AE1 (band 3). Cdk5, a neuron-specific kinase, is ‘’S’’-nitrosylated at cysteines 83 and 157 in neurodegenerative diseases such as Alzheimer’s disease. SNO-Cdk5 then transnitrosylates Drp1, a regulator of mitochondrial fission.
