= Oskar Baudisch =

Austrian-American biochemist (1881–1950)

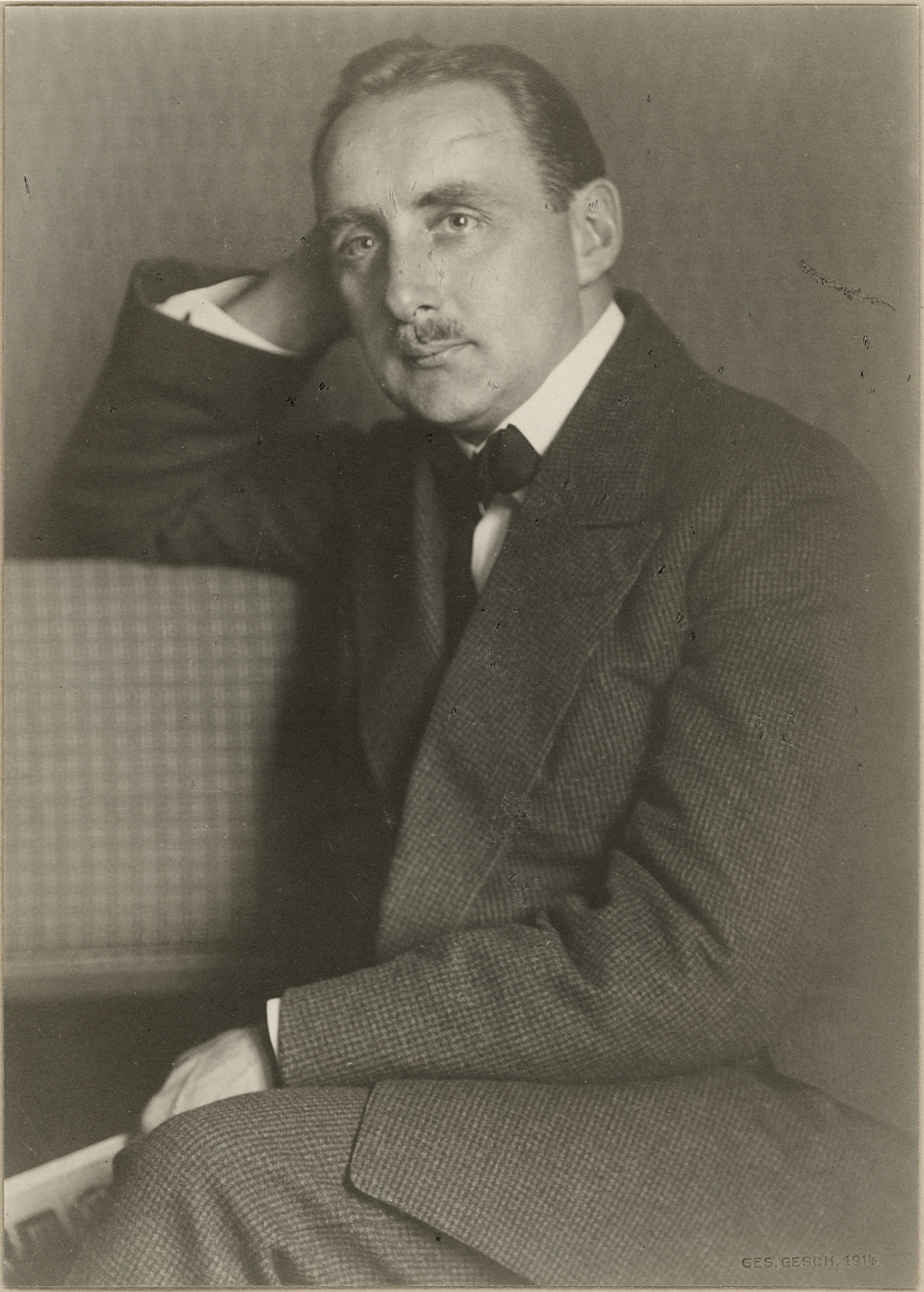
- Born: 3 June 1881; Maffersdorf, Austria Hungary
- Died: 29 March 1950 (aged 68); La Jolla, California, U.S.
- Education: University of Zurich
- Known for: Baudisch reaction
- Scientific career
- Fields: Chemistry
- Workplaces: Research Institute of the Saratoga Spa

Oskar Baudisch (3 June 1881 – 29 March 1950) was an Austrian American biochemist and radiographer. He is mainly known for a chemical reaction that bears his name, the Baudisch reaction.

== Early life and education ==
Baudisch was born to Joseph and Julie Baudisch in Maffersdorf, Austria, which is today Vratislavice nad Nisou, now part of the Czech Republic.

He received his first education in chemistry at the Staatsgewerbeschule in Reichenberg. Since this kind of school was not sufficient to be allowed to start a Ph. D. thesis in Austria, he went abroad. Baudisch studied chemistry in Zurich, where he obtained his Ph.D. in 1904.

== Career ==
=== In Europe ===
After a year of military service in the Austro-Hungarian Army, he worked for his former chemistry teacher, Ferdinand Breinl, in Reichenberg. There he published a paper on the oxidation of proteins by hydrogen peroxide. He then joined the group of Eugen Bamberger at the University of Zurich as a private assistant.

In 1907 he joined the University of Manchester where he worked with William Henry Perkin, Jr. During this time he published his work on Cupferron, a complexation agent later used for the quantitative analysis of copper and iron. Baudisch left London in 1909 and worked in the dyestuff industry for some time. In 1911, he worked with Alfred Werner in Zurich, and obtained his habilitation.

Just before the outbreak of World War I, he became director of the Strahlenforschungsinstitut (radiation research institute) in Hamburg. During the war, Baudisch served in the Austria-Hungary army in the fields of medicine and epidemic control. After the war he joined the Kaiser Wilhelm Institute for Physics in Berlin.

=== In America ===
In 1920, he assumed a professorship of photochemistry at Yale University. Two years later, he moved to the Rockefeller Institute for Medical Research where he concentrated his research on trace minerals in soil and water. In 1933, he was asked to head the New York State Institute of Balneology and Hydrotherapy at Saratoga Springs, New York. During his time at this institute he also worked on the impact of trace minerals in water on health. During this time he published on iron-pyridine complexes.

In 1939 Baudisch discovered the copper-catalyzed reaction of phenols and hydroxylamine hydrochloride to give o-nitrosophenols. This reaction is today known as the Baudisch reaction.

== Death ==
Baudisch drowned on 28 March 1950 near La Jolla, California in a boating accident. He had been working on a research project on trace elements in the sea for the Scripps Institution of Oceanography, La Jolla.
