= Isodiazene =

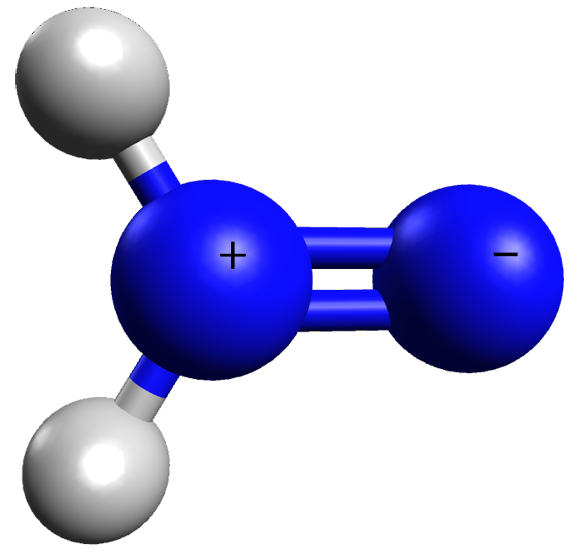

Identifiers
CAS Number	72076-37-0 Parent compound
3D model (JSmol)	Interactive image
PubChem CID	53471109
- InChI: InChI=1S/H2N2/c1-2/h1H2 Key: CREXVNNSNOKDHW-UHFFFAOYSA-N
- SMILES: [NH2+]=[N-]

Properties
Chemical formula	H_{2}N_{2}
Molar mass	30.030 g·mol^{−1}
- Except where otherwise noted, data are given for materials in their standard state (at 25 °C [77 °F], 100 kPa). Infobox references

In organic chemistry, an isodiazene, also known by the incorrectly constructed (but commonly used) name 1,1-diazene or systematic name diazanylidene, is an organic derivative of the parent isodiazene (H_{2}N^{+}=N^{–}, also called 1,1-diimide) with general formula R^{1}R^{2}N^{+}=N^{–}. The functional group has two major resonance forms, a diazen-2-ium-1-ide form, and an aminonitrene form:

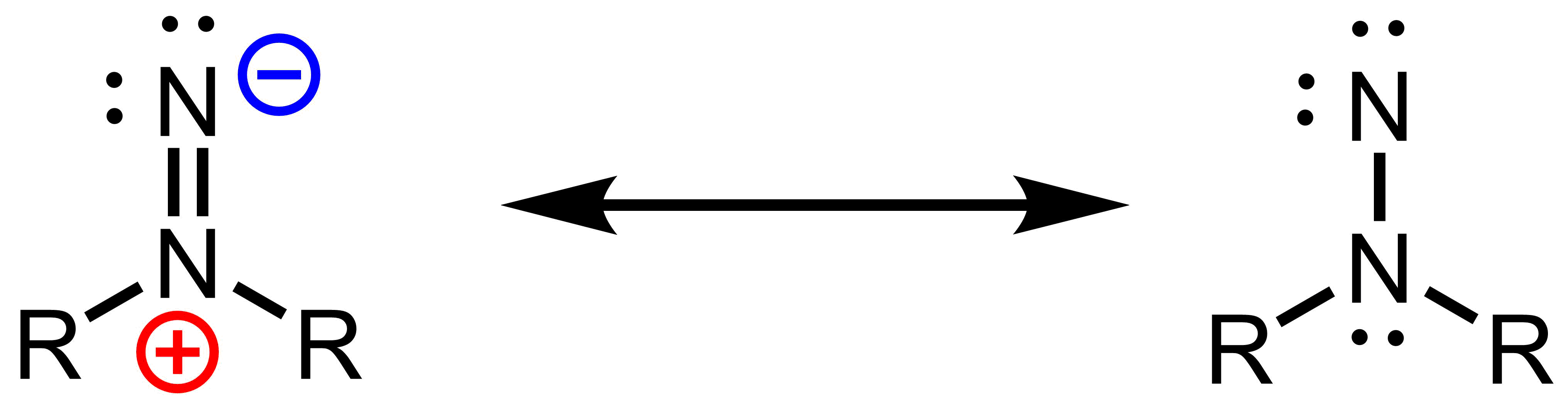

Although isodiazenes are formally isoelectronic with ketones and aldehydes, the reactivity of this exotic functional group is very different.

In the absence of other reactants, they facilely undergo reactions in which N_{2} is eliminated. Consequently, most isodiazenes can only be isolated in a matrix at cryogenic temperatures. They are generally used to "snip out" nitrogen atoms from molecules, typically leaving two radicals that then couple.

== Preparation ==
There are multiple methods for the preparation of isodiazene intermediates:

- Oxidation of the hydrazine (R_{2}N–NH_{2}) with mercuric oxide.
- 1,1-Elimination of MX from R_{2}N–NMX (M = Na, K; X = SO_{2}Ar).
- Treatment of secondary amines with nitrene sources including electrophilic amination reagents; Angeli's salt; sulfuryl azides, especially sulfuryl diazide; "anomeric amides" of the form RC(=O)N(OR′)_{2}; or an iminoiodinane.
- Reduction of nitrosamines with dithionite.

== Stable isodiazenes ==
A small number of highly hindered derivatives with tertiary R groups (e.g., R^{1}= R^{2} = t-Bu, stable at –127 °C, decomposes at –90 °C; R^{1}—R^{2} = C(CH_{3})_{2}CH_{2}CH_{2}CH_{2}(CH_{3})_{2}C, stable up to –78 °C) are isolable by preparation and chromatography or filtration at low temperature as red solutions.

Isodiazenes have been observed to serve as ligands in transition metals complexes, including those of molybdenum and vanadium.

== Atypical reactions ==
Elimination of N_{2} from cyclic isodiazenes is concerted, not radical:

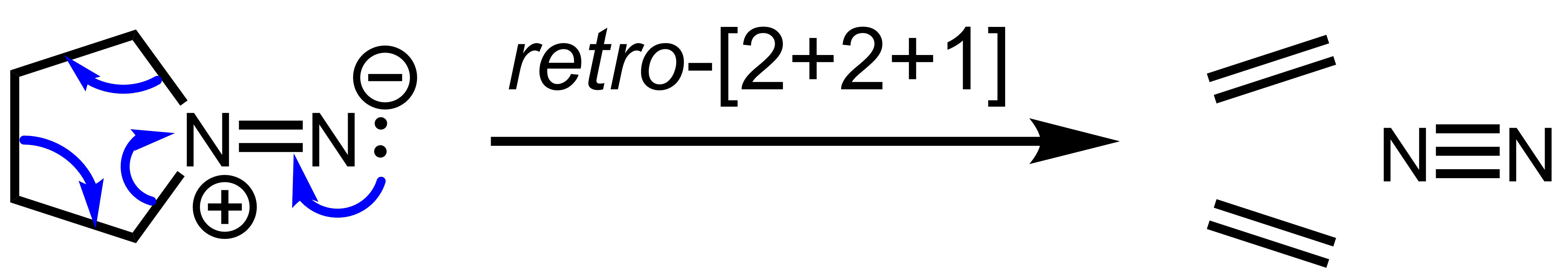

If the reaction were radical, then a cyclobutane would be expected. Also, the reaction exhibits stereospecificity consistent with Woodward and Hoffman's rules:

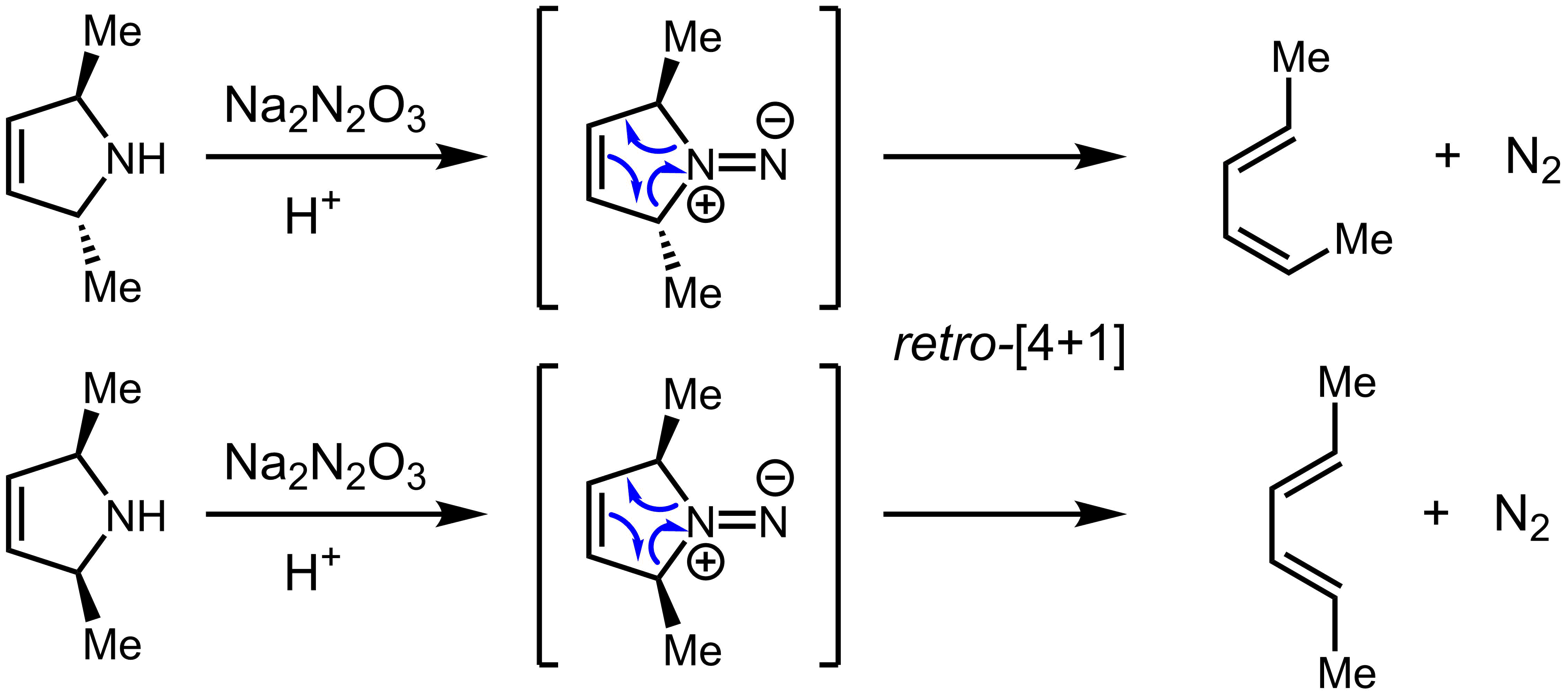

Isodiazenes participate in cycloaddition reactions with alkenes to generate N-aminoaziridines.

== See also ==
- Diazene
- Ylide
- Nitrene
