= Nitrosamine formation during digestion =

In biochemistry, nitrosamines are a class of compounds that can form during food digestion, or in food processing and preparation. The presence of their precursors, nitrites, in cured meats, is controversial.

The WHO has classified preserved meats as a known to cause human cancers, Group 1 carcinogens. The reaction of nitrites to form known carcinogenic nitrosamines is well studied. "Decades of toxicological and epidemiological evidence have unequivocally established several NAs [nitrosamines] as potent human carcinogens, with strong associations with gastrointestinal, pancreatic, and liver cancers."

== Background ==
Nitroso compounds react with primary amines in acidic environments to form nitrosamines, which human metabolism converts to mutagenic diazo compounds. Small amounts of nitro and nitroso compounds form during meat curing; the toxicity of these compounds preserves the meat against bacterial infection. After curing completes, the concentration of these compounds appears to degrade over time. Their presence in finished products has been tightly regulated since several food-poisoning cases in the early 20th century, but consumption of large quantities of processed meats can still cause a slight elevation in gastric and oesophageal cancer risk today.

For example, during the 1970s, certain Norwegian farm animals began exhibiting elevated levels of liver cancer. These animals had been fed herring meal preserved with sodium nitrite. The sodium nitrite had reacted with dimethylamine in the fish and produced dimethylnitrosamine.

The effects of nitroso compounds vary dramatically across the gastrointestinal tract, and with diet. Nitroso compounds present in stool do not induce nitrosamine formation, because stool has neutral pH. Stomach acid catalyzes nitrosamine compound formation and is the main location of the reaction during digestion.

The formation process is inhibited when amine concentration is low (e.g. a low-protein diet or no fermented food). The process may also be inhibited in the case of high vitamin C (ascorbic acid) or erythorbic acid concentration (e.g. high-fruit diet). However, when 10% of the meal is fat, the effect reverses, and ascorbic acid markedly increases nitrosamine formation. Vitamin C and erythorbic acid are already commonly used in the meat industry because they enhance the binding of nitrite to myoglobin, encouraging the formation of the desired pink color.
