= Vratislavice nad Nisou =

Borough of Liberec in the Czech Republic

Coordinates: 50°44′36″N 15°05′33″E

Vratislavice nad Nisou (German: Maffersdorf) is a self-governing borough of the city of Liberec in the Czech Republic. It has about 8,900 inhabitants.

== Geography ==
Vratislavice nad Nisou straddles the Lusatian Neisse river between Liberec and Jablonec nad Nisou, around 3.5 kilometres (2.2 mi) southeast of Liberec city centre.

== History ==
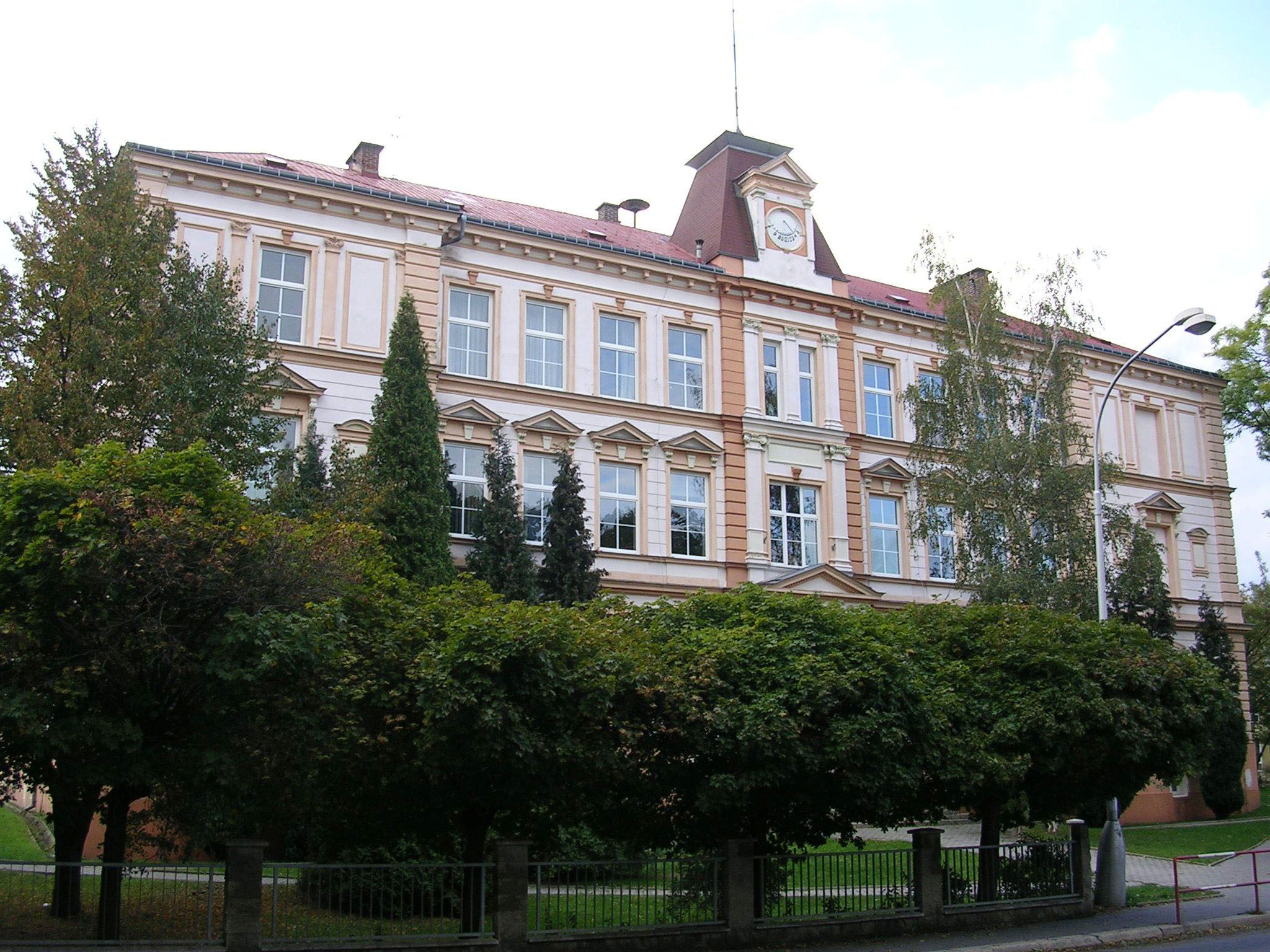
School in Vratislavice nad Nisou

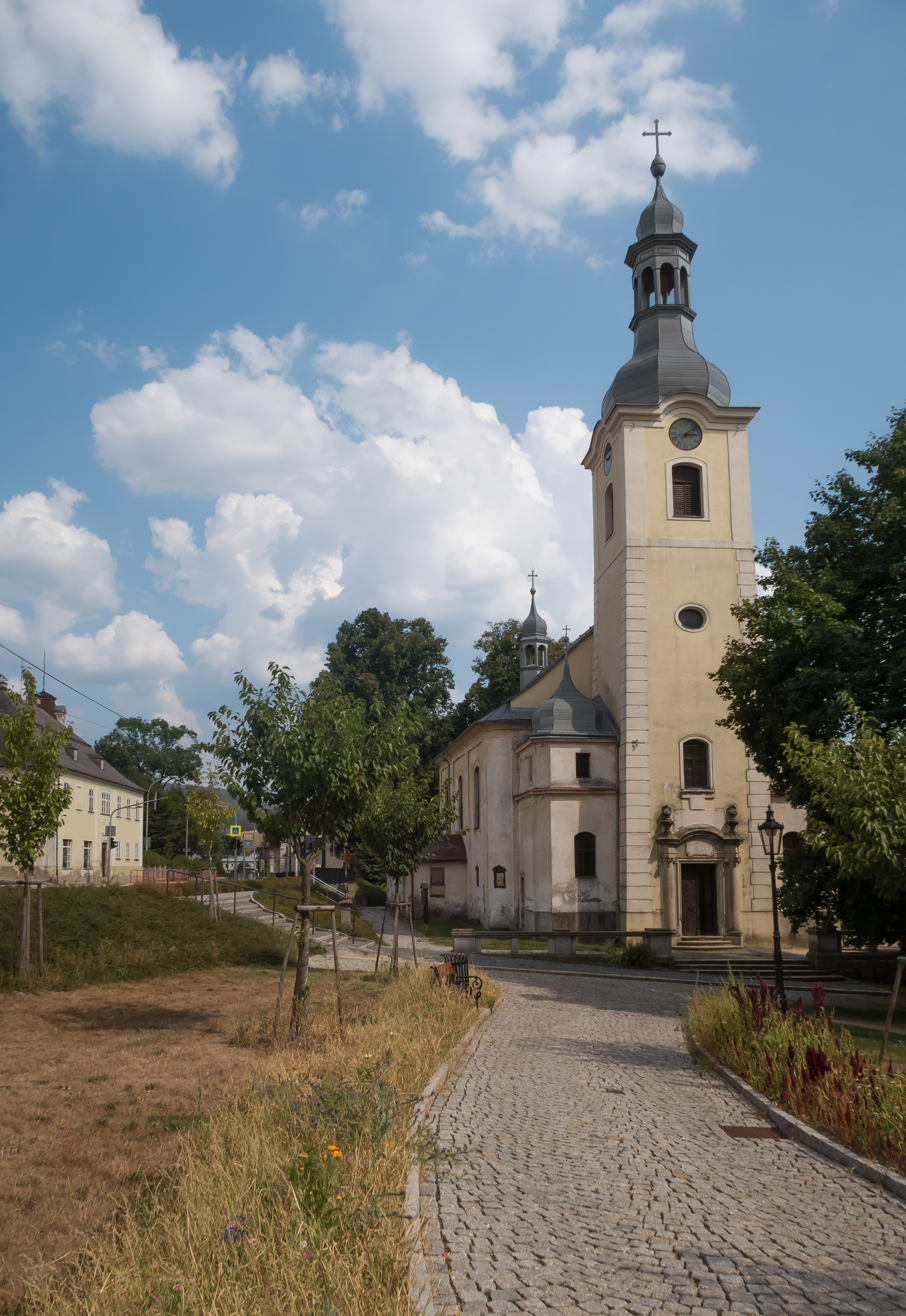
Church of the Holy Trinity

The settlement of Wratislawicz was established, it is thought, in the 13th century by Bohemian colonists on the left bank of the Lusatian Neisse river. The very first written document mentioning this place comes from the 1460s which by this stage had a stone church. The right bank of the Lusatian Neisse was settled (as an independent village) during the 16th century by German speaking people from Silesia, and called the village Meffersdorf after the settlers' home village. These two villages possessed not only different names, but even belonged to different governances (Liberec and Český Dub). After the Thirty Years' War the German name, mangled to Maffersdorf, became used for both places – the name Wratislawicz faded into obscurity.

Maffersdorf on the right bank (Liberec side) of Lusatian Neisse continued to grow steadily. In 1701, construction of a new parish church was finished, designed by a Prague architect Marco Antonio Canavelli.

In the second half of the 19th century industrial activity arrived to both villages. A carpet-making factory founded by Ignaz Ginzkey (and developed by his son Willy) achieved world renown. In 1924, Ginzkey equipped the Waldorf-Astoria hotel in New York City with the world's largest carpet. In 1871 Franz Peukert established a company that later developed into a familiar name in butcher's equipment. Eduard Stiassny founded porcelain production in the town in 1896.

After the discovery of a spring in 1862, the village on the left bank became involved in the spa business. In 1913, the owner of the spa, Rudolf, joined with Weber, the owner of a mineral water source discovered in 1866. Afterwards in 1918, the spa in Maffersdorf was bought by the owner of the resort in Lázně Libverda to promote competition.

In 1872, Reichenberger founded a public-owned brewery and maltworks in Maffersdorf, which became famous for its beer. The two settlements that belonged to the Bohemian governance of Liberec (Reichenberg) had 4,910 inhabitants between them. A local railway branch line was inaugurated on the 12th of July as a part of the Liberec-Jablonec-Tanvald railway route, leading to the building of two stations - Mattersdorf and Dörfel.

In 1901 both villages were merged into one market town (population 6,234 by 1934), and Czech inhabitants started to use currently known name Vratislavice. In 1903 it obtained full status as a town, and 1918 saw the area become part of the newly founded state of Czechoslovakia.

As a part of the Sudetenland, the town was occupied and incorporated into Nazi Germany, according to the Munich Agreement, followed in 1945 by the expulsion of nearly all of the almost exclusively German-speaking inhabitants of the town by the Czechoslovak government to Germany, as agreed upon by the Allies as a definite solution to the existing ethnic strife.

In 1951, the town became connected to Liberec and Jablonec by a tram project that had been proposed since 1900. In 1970, services on the tramway had been periodically discontinued due to the poor condition of the tracks. Nowadays, the streetcar route is operated by the local transportation company Dopravní podnik města Liberce.

Vratislavice was promoted to the status of town again in 1956, but in 1980 it became an administrative part of Liberec. Since 1989, there have been several attempts to renew the status of an independent town of Vratislavice.

== Demographics ==
Historical population

| Year | Pop. | ±% |
|---|---|---|
| 1869 | 3,957 | — |
| 1880 | 4,910 | +24.1% |
| 1890 | 5,859 | +19.3% |
| 1900 | 6,566 | +12.1% |
| 1910 | 6,908 | +5.2% |

| Year | Pop. | ±% |
|---|---|---|
| 1921 | 5,985 | −13.4% |
| 1930 | 6,605 | +10.4% |
| 1950 | 4,759 | −27.9% |
| 1961 | 4,787 | +0.6% |
| 1970 | 4,589 | −4.1% |

| Year | Pop. | ±% |
|---|---|---|
| 1980 | 5,863 | +27.8% |
| 1991 | 6,054 | +3.3% |
| 2001 | 6,657 | +10.0% |
| 2011 | 8,109 | +21.8% |
| 2021 | 8,935 | +10.2% |

Source: Censuses

== Economy ==
After the dissolution of the Communist Party rule during the Velvet Revolution, some companies found the transition into the free-market economy very difficult. The well-known brewery, Vratislav was so run down that it was forced into closure in 1998. During a two-year dormancy the company was bought by the Hols firm, the brewery was put back into operation in summer of 2004, trading under the name of Konrád. In 2003, the Hols brewery produced 6,500,000 litres (1.7 million US gallons). In October 2004, a new classic car museum was opened in the grounds of the brewery.

Vratislavice is not only notable in drinks industry as a producer of beer; Vratislavická kyselka s.r.o., owned by UNIPO a.s. of Pardubice, produce mineral water (Vratislavická kyselka) and other alcohol-free beverages.

To this day, the brewery and carpet factory are the most important industries in Vratislavice.

== Notable people ==
- Ferdinand Porsche (1875–1951), car designer
- Oskar Baudisch (1881–1950), German-American radiographer
- Konrad Henlein (1898–1945), Nazi politician
- Roland Bulirsch (1932–2022), mathematician; grew up here
