= S-Nitrosotriphenylmethanethiol =

Identifiers
CAS Number	6316-86-5
3D model (JSmol)	Interactive image
ChemSpider	85891
PubChem CID	95186
UNII	EDT6XKN756
CompTox Dashboard (EPA)	DTXSID80212503
- InChI: InChI=1S/C19H15NOS/c21-20-22-19(16-10-4-1-5-11-16,17-12-6-2-7-13-17)18-14-8-3-9-15-18/h1-15H Key: YLEVRGODADSYBK-UHFFFAOYSA-N
- SMILES: C1=CC=C(C=C1)C(C2=CC=CC=C2)(C3=CC=CC=C3)SN=O

Properties
Chemical formula	C_{19}H_{15}NOS
Molar mass	305.40 g·mol^{−1}
Appearance	green solid
Melting point	110 °C (230 °F; 383 K) decomposition
- Except where otherwise noted, data are given for materials in their standard state (at 25 °C [77 °F], 100 kPa). Infobox references

S-Nitrosotriphenylmethanethiol is the organosulfur compound with the formula (C_{6}H_{5})_{3}CSNO. It is a rare example of a nitrosothiol derivative that is robust solid at room temperature. The green compound can be produced by the reaction of triphenylmethanethiol with nitrous acid:

(C_{6}H_{5})_{3}CSH + HONO → (C_{6}H_{5})_{3}CSNO + H_{2}O

According to X-ray crystallography, S-nitrosotriphenylmethanethiol features a conventional trityl group appended to a bent SNO substituent. The S-N=O angle is 114°, while the S-N and N=O distances are 1.78 and 1.79 Å. Other S-nitrosothiols, e.g. MeSNO and SNAP have characterized by similar structures.
