= Remini =

Remini is a surname. Notable people with the surname include:

- Robert V. Remini (1921–2013), American historian
- Leah Remini (born 1970), American actress

== See also ==
- Rimini (disambiguation)
