= Battle of Rimini =

Battle of Rimini may refer to:

- Battle of Rimini (432), fought between competing factions in the Western Roman Empire
- Battle of Rimini (1944), sometimes used as a synonym of the larger Operation Olive, an offensive by 15th Army Group in Italy
