= S-Nitrosoglutathione =

- Stereo, skeletal formula of S-nitrosoglutathione

Names
- IUPAC name L-γ-Glutamyl-S-nitroso-L-cysteinylglycine
- Systematic IUPAC name (2S)-2-Amino-5-({(2R)-1-[(carboxymethyl)amino]-3-(nitrososulfanyl)-1-oxopropan-2-yl}amino)-5-oxopentanoic acid
- Other names Glutathione thionitrite; S-Nitroso-L-glutathione; SNOG; GSNO

Identifiers
CAS Number	57564-91-7
3D model (JSmol)	Interactive image
Beilstein Reference	3566211
ChEBI	CHEBI:50091
ChEMBL	ChEMBL156747
ChemSpider	94647
ECHA InfoCard	100.165.055
MeSH	S-Nitrosoglutathione
PubChem CID	104858
RTECS number	MC0558000
UNII	78RRI89ZTO
CompTox Dashboard (EPA)	DTXSID1040613
- InChI: InChI=1S/C10H16N4O7S/c11-5(10(19)20)1-2-7(15)13-6(4-22-14-21)9(18)12-3-8(16)17/h5-6H,1-4,11H2,(H,12,18)(H,13,15)(H,16,17)(H,19,20)/t5-,6-/m0/s1 Key: HYHSBSXUHZOYLX-WDSKDSINSA-N
- SMILES: C(CC(=O)N[C@@H](CSN=O)C(=O)NCC(=O)O)[C@@H](C(=O)O)N

Properties
Chemical formula	C_{10}H_{16}N_{4}O_{7}S
Molar mass	336.32 g·mol^{−1}
log P	−2.116
Acidity (pK_{a})	2.212
Basicity (pK_{b})	11.785
- Except where otherwise noted, data are given for materials in their standard state (at 25 °C [77 °F], 100 kPa). Infobox references

S-Nitrosoglutathione (GSNO) is an endogenous S-nitrosothiol (SNO) that plays a critical role in nitric oxide (NO) signaling and is a source of bioavailable NO. NO coexists in cells with SNOs that serve as endogenous NO carriers and donors. SNOs spontaneously release NO at different rates and can be powerful terminators of free radical chain propagation reactions, by reacting directly with ROO• radicals, yielding nitro derivatives as end products. NO is generated intracellularly by the nitric oxide synthase (NOS) family of enzymes: nNOS, eNOS and iNOS while the in vivo source of many of the SNOs is unknown. In oxygenated buffers, however, formation of SNOs is due to oxidation of NO to dinitrogen trioxide (N_{2}O_{3}). Some evidence suggests that both exogenous NO and endogenously derived NO from nitric oxide synthases can react with glutathione to form GSNO.

== GSNOR ==
The enzyme GSNO reductase (GSNOR) reduces S-nitrosoglutathione (GSNO) to an unstable intermediate, S-hydroxylaminoglutathione, which then rearranges to form glutathione sulfonamide, or in the presence of GSH, forms glutathione disulfide and hydroxylamine.

S-Nitrosoglutathione
+ NADH
GSH
GSH
Glutathione disulfide
+ NAD^{+} + NH_{2}OH

Through this catabolic process, GSNOR regulates the cellular concentrations of GSNO and plays a central role in regulating the levels of endogenous S-nitrosothiols and controlling protein S-nitrosylation-based signaling.

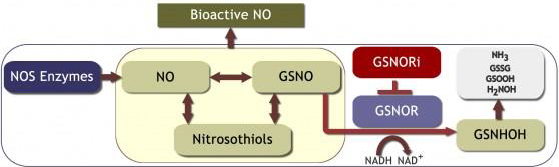
The chemical synthesis of GSNO

The generation of GSNO can serve as a stable and mobile NO pool which can effectively transduce NO signaling. Unlike other low molecular weight messengers that bind to and activate target cellular receptors, NO signaling is mediated by a coordinating complex between NO and transition metals or target cellular proteins, often via S-nitrosylation of cysteine residues. Studies suggest that NO metabolism has a significant role in human cardiovascular and respiratory diseases as well as in immune tolerance during organ transplantation.

== GSNO in health and disease ==
GSNO and NO concentrations regulate respiratory function by modulating airway tone and pro- and anti-inflammatory responses in the respiratory tract. Because NO is a labile gas and endogenous levels are difficult to manipulate, it has been proposed that exogenous GSNO could be used to regulate circulating levels of NO and NO-derived species, and GSNO could have value in patients with pulmonary diseases such as cystic fibrosis. Consistent with this therapeutic goal, a recent study showed that acute treatment with aerosolized GSNO was well tolerated by cystic fibrosis patients.

SNOs in the hepatic mitochondria appear to influence proper functioning of the liver. Mitochondrial SNO-proteins inhibit Complex I of the electron transport chain; modulate mitochondrial reactive oxygen species (ROS) production; influence calcium-dependent opening of the mitochondrial permeability transition pore; promote selective importation of mitochondrial proteins; and stimulate mitochondrial fission. Altered redox balance plays a crucial role in the pathogenesis of liver diseases including steatosis, steatohepatitis, and fibrosis. The ease of reversibility and the interplay of S-nitrosating and denitrosating enzymatic reactions support the hypothesis that SNOs regulate the mitochondrion through redox mechanisms.

In a study evaluating the effects on ursodeoxycholic acid (UDCA) on bile flow and cirrhosis, NO was found in bile as SNOs, primarily GSNO. UDCA-stimulated biliary NO secretion was abolished by the inhibition of iNOS with L-NAME in isolated perfused livers and also in rat livers depleted of GSH with buthionine sulfoximine. Moreover, the biliary secretion of NO species was significantly diminished in UDCA-infused transport mutant [ATP–binding cassette C2/multidrug resistance–associated protein 2–deficient] rats, and this finding was consistent with the involvement of the glutathione carrier ABCC2/Mrp2 in the canalicular transport of GSNO. It was particularly noteworthy that in cultured normal rat cholangiocytes, GSNO activated protein kinase B, protected against apoptosis, and enhanced UDCA-induced ATP release to the medium. Finally, they demonstrated that retrograde GSNO infusion into the common bile duct increased bile flow and biliary bicarbonate secretion. The study concluded that UDCA-induced biliary secretion of GSNO contributed to stimulating ductal secretion of bile.

== Neuromodulator ==
GSNO, along with glutathione and oxidized glutathione (GSSG), have been found to bind to the glutamate recognition site of the NMDA and AMPA receptors (via their γ-glutamyl moieties), and may be endogenous neuromodulators. At millimolar concentrations, they may also modulate the redox state of the NMDA receptor complex.
