= Piloty's acid =

Names
- Preferred IUPAC name N-Hydroxybenzenesulfonamide
- Other names benzenesulfohydroxamic acid

Identifiers
CAS Number	599-71-3
ChEMBL	ChEMBL55310
ChemSpider	62255
ECHA InfoCard	100.009.068
EC Number	209-973-8
PubChem CID	69033
UNII	C64L4UMH19
CompTox Dashboard (EPA)	DTXSID4060521
- InChI: InChI=1S/C6H7NO3S/c8-7-11(9,10)6-4-2-1-3-5-6/h1-5,7-8H Key: BRMDATNYMUMZLN-UHFFFAOYSA-N

Properties
Chemical formula	C_{6}H_{7}NO_{3}S
Molar mass	173.19 g·mol^{−1}
Appearance	white solid
Melting point	186 °C (367 °F; 459 K)
Acidity (pK_{a})	9.29
- Except where otherwise noted, data are given for materials in their standard state (at 25 °C [77 °F], 100 kPa). Infobox references

Piloty's acid is an organic compound with the formula C_{6}H_{5}SO_{2}N(H)OH. A white solid, it is the benzenesulfonyl derivative of hydroxylamine. It is one of the main reagents used to generate nitroxyl (HNO), a highly reactive species that is implicated in some chemical and biochemical reactions.

== See also ==
- Angeli's salt
