= Nitroxyl =

- Ball and stick model of nitroxyl

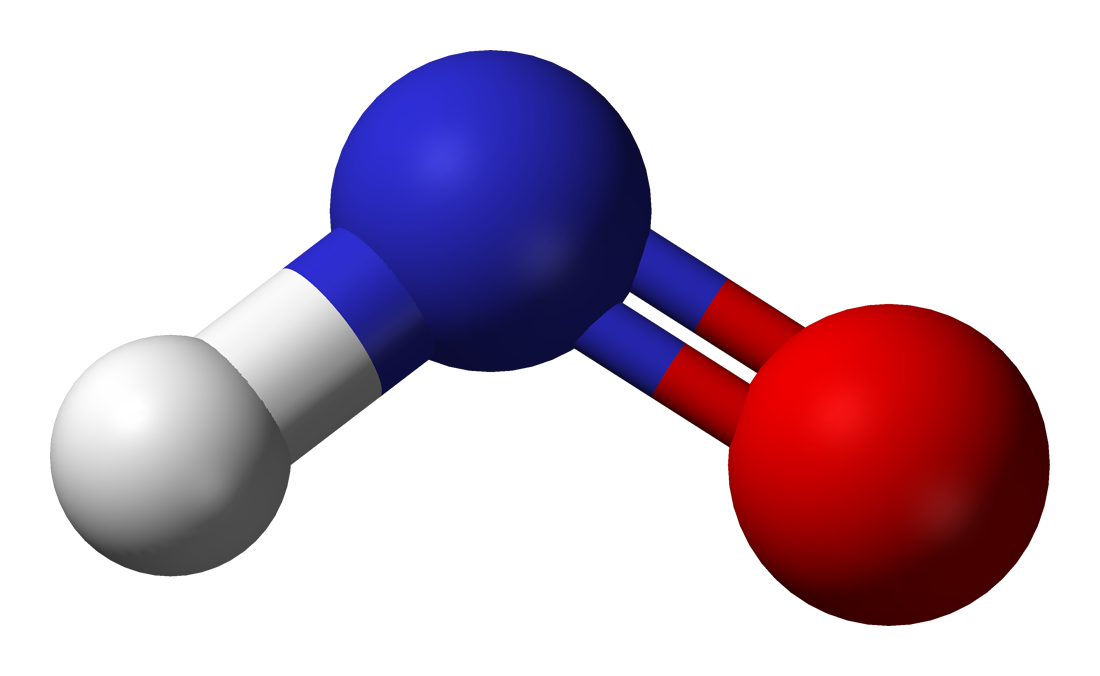

Names
- IUPAC name Azanone
- Systematic IUPAC name Oxidanimine
- Other names Hydrogen nitroxide Hydrogen oxonitrate(I); Hyponitrous acid monomer Nitronous oxide Nitrosyl hydride

Identifiers
CAS Number	14332-28-6
3D model (JSmol)	Interactive image
ChEMBL	ChEMBL1200689
ChemSpider	920
MeSH	Nitroxyl
PubChem CID	945
UNII	GFQ4MMS07W
- InChI: InChI=1S/HNO/c1-2/h1H Key: ODUCDPQEXGNKDN-UHFFFAOYSA-N
- SMILES: N=O

Properties
Chemical formula	HNO
Molar mass	31.014 g·mol^{−1}
log P	0.74

Structure
Coordination geometry	Digonal
Molecular shape	Bent

Thermochemistry
Heat capacity (C)	33.88 J K^{−1} mol^{−1}
Std molar entropy (S^{⦵}_{298})	220.91 J K^{−1} mol^{−1}
- Except where otherwise noted, data are given for materials in their standard state (at 25 °C [77 °F], 100 kPa). Infobox references

Nitroxyl (common name) or azanone (IUPAC name) is the chemical compound HNO. It is well known in the gas phase. Nitroxyl can be formed as a short-lived intermediate in solution. Its conjugate base, NO^{−}, the nitroxide anion, is the reduced form of nitric oxide (NO) and is isoelectronic with dioxygen. The bond dissociation energy of H−NO is 49.5 kcal/mol (207 kJ/mol), which is unusually weak for a bond to the hydrogen atom.

== Generation ==
Nitroxyl is produced from the reagents Angeli's salt (Na_{2}N_{2}O_{3}) and Piloty's acid (PhSO_{2}NHOH). Other notable studies on the production of HNO exploit cycloadducts of acyl nitroso species, which are known to decompose via hydrolysis to HNO and acyl acid. Upon photolysis these compounds release the acyl nitroso species which then further decompose. HNO is generated via organic oxidation of cyclohexanone oxime with lead tetraacetate to form 1-nitrosocyclohexyl acetate:

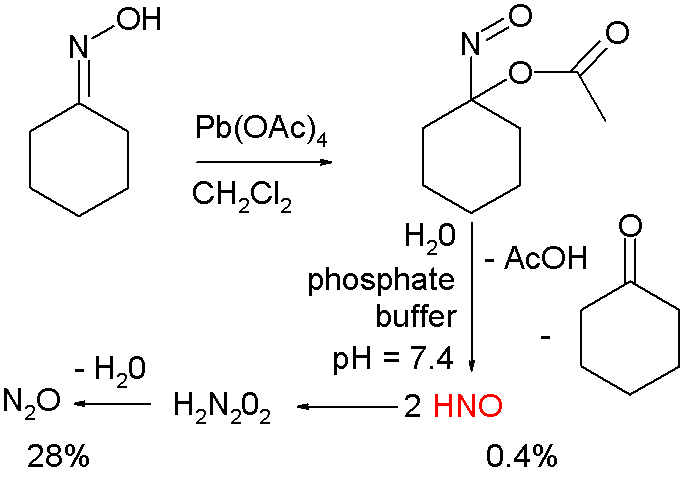
Nitrosocyclohexyl acetate

This compound can be hydrolyzed under basic conditions in a phosphate buffer to HNO, acetic acid, and cyclohexanone.

Dichloramine reacts with the hydroxide ion, which is always present in water, to yield nitroxyl and the chloride ion.

Alkali metals react with nitric oxide to give salts of the form MNO (M = metal). However, generation of the (unstable) free acid from these salts is not entirely straightforward (see below).

== Reactions ==
Nitroxyl is a weak acid, with pK_{a} of about 11, the conjugate base being the triplet state of NO^{−}, sometimes called nitroxide. Nitroxyl itself, however, is a singlet ground state. Thus, deprotonation of nitroxyl uniquely involves the forbidden spin crossing from the singlet state starting material to triplet state product:

^{1}HNO + B^{−} → ^{3}NO^{−} + BH

Due to the spin-forbidden nature of deprotonation, proton abstraction is many orders of magnitude slower (k = 4.9×10^{4} M^{−1} s^{−1} for deprotonation by OH^{−}) than what one would expect for a heteroatom proton-transfer process (processes that are so fast that they are sometimes diffusion-controlled).

The K_{a} of starting from or ending with the electronic excited states has also been determined. When process of deprotonating singlet state HNO to obtain singlet state NO^{−} has a pK_{a} is about 23. On the other hand, when deprotonating triplet HNO to obtain triplet NO^{−}, the pK_{a} is about −1.8.

Nitroxyl rapidly decomposes by a bimolecular pathway to nitrous oxide (k at 298 K = 8×10^{6} M s):

2 HNO → N_{2}O + H_{2}O

The reaction proceeds via dimerization to hyponitrous acid, H_{2}N_{2}O_{2}, which subsequently undergoes dehydration. Therefore, HNO is generally prepared in situ as described above.

Nitroxyl is very reactive towards nucleophiles, including thiols. The initial adduct rearranges to a sulfinamide:

HNO + RSH → RS(O)NH_{2}

== Detection ==
In biological samples, nitroxyl can be detected using fluorescent sensors, many of which are based on the reduction of copper(II) to copper(I) with concomitant increase in fluorescence.

== Medicinal chemistry ==
Nitroxyl donors, known as nitroso compounds, show potential in the treatment of heart failure and ongoing research is focused on finding new molecules for this task.

== See also ==
- Nitroxyl radicals (also called aminoxyl radicals) — chemical species containing the R_{2}N−O^{•} functional group
