= Angeli's salt =

Names
- IUPAC name Disodium nitroazanidolate
- Other names Sodium α-oxyhyponitrite

Identifiers
CAS Number	13826-64-7
3D model (JSmol)	Interactive image
ChemSpider	26377875; 8549896
PubChem CID	10129945
UNII	S8LUE47R4Z
- InChI: InChI=1S/N2O3.2Na/c3-1-2(4)5;;/q;2*+1 Key: XDPWLJKQGUTUKZ-UHFFFAOYSA-N
- SMILES: N(=O)[N+](=O)[O-].[Na+].[Na+]

Properties
Chemical formula	N_{2}Na_{2}O_{3}
Molar mass	121.991 g·mol^{−1}
Appearance	white solid
Solubility in water	Very soluble
Acidity (pK_{a})	pK_{a1}(H_{2}N_{2}O_{3}) = 2.5; pK_{a2}(H_{2}N_{2}O_{3}) = 9.7 (1 °C)
- Except where otherwise noted, data are given for materials in their standard state (at 25 °C [77 °F], 100 kPa). Infobox references

Angeli's salt, sodium trioxodinitrate, is the inorganic compound with the formula Na_{2}[N_{2}O_{3}]. It contains nitrogen in an unusual reduced state. It is a colorless, water-soluble solid, hence a salt. In research, this salt is used as a source of the metastable nitroxyl (HNO), which is a signalling molecule in nature. It is also known by the name sodium trioxodinitrate(II).

== Preparation and properties ==
As first reported by Angelo Angeli in 1896, the salt is prepared by combining hydroxylamine and an organic nitrate, as a source of nitronium (NO^{+}_{2}):

NH_{2}OH + RONO_{2} + 2 NaOR′ → ROH + 2 R′OH + Na_{2}N_{2}O_{3}

The structure of the hydrate has been confirmed by X-ray crystallography. The anion is planar. Starting from the ONN end, the bond distances are 1.35 Å (N–O), 1.26 Å (N–N), 1.31 Å (N–O_{trans}), and 1.32 Å (N–O_{cis}). The negative charge is on the oxygen atoms at opposite ends of the molecule. The angles are 112.9° (O_{single}–N–N), 118.4° (N–N–O_{trans}), and 122.5° (N–N–O_{cis}). This means that the nitrogen–nitrogen bond is a double bond, and that the cis oxygen is slightly repelled by the single oxygen.

== Decomposition ==
Aqueous solutions of trioxodinitrate are unstable below pH 10. The rate of decomposition increases between pH 10 and 8, remains essentially constant between pH 8 and 4, then accelerates again below pH 4.

Between pH 8 and 4, the main decomposition mechanism is tautomerization of monoprotonated trioxodinitrate (O^{−})_{2}N^{+}=N(OH) to O_{2}N−NH(O^{−}), which decomposes reversibly to nitrite (NO^{−}_{2}) and nitroxyl (HNO). The resulting nitroxyl dimerizes rapidly to hyponitrous acid (HON=NOH), which dehydrates to nitrous oxide.

HN_{2}O^{−}_{3} ⇌ HNO + NO^{−}_{2}
2HNO → H_{2}N_{2}O_{2} → H_{2}O + N_{2}O

Below pH 4, the main decomposition mechanism is tautomerization of diprotonated trioxodinitrate (O^{−})_{2}N^{+}=N^{+}H(OH) to reach the unstable transition state (O^{−})(H_{2}O^{+})N^{+}=N(O^{−}). This loses water to yield an excited state of trans-dinitrogen dioxide that, upon de-excitation, fragments to two nitric oxide molecules.

H_{2}N_{2}O_{3} → H_{2}O + 2NO

== Reactions ==
Reaction of Angeli's salt with secondary amines in the presence of a proton source results in extrusion of N_{2} via isodiazenes as proposed intermediates.
