= BioMotiv =

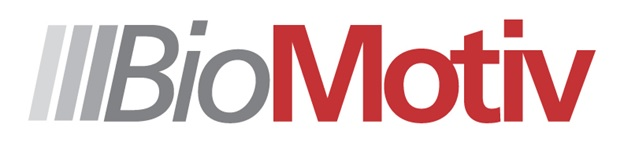
- Industry: Biotechnology
- Founded: Cleveland, Ohio, 2012
- Headquarters: Cleveland, United States
- Key people: Baiju Shah, CEO
- Subsidiaries: Allinaire Therapeutics; Dual Therapeutics; Kodosil Bio; Koutif Therapeutics; Nynex Therapeutics; Optikira; Orca Therapeutics; SapVax; Sujana; Inclera
- Website: www.biomotiv.com

BioMotiv is an accelerator company associated with The Harrington Project, an initiative centered at University Hospitals of Cleveland. Therapeutic opportunities were identified through relationships with The Harrington Discovery Institute, university and research institutions, disease foundations, and industry sources. Once opportunities are identified, BioMotiv oversees the development, funding, active management, and partnering of the therapeutic products.

== History ==
The Harrington Project was launched as an effort to bridge varying aspects of the drug development sphere. In response to recent decline in the number of traditional, early-stage biotechnology venture capital firms, BioMotiv utilizes an asset-centric model to in-license, fund, and manage technologies in-house. Its goal is to address the "valley of death" between research, discovery, and early clinical-stage drug development. Projects were advanced by the management team through clinical proof-of-concept, and then out-licensed via strategic alliances with pharmaceutical companies.

The company has raised over $146 million to date. Major investors include The Harrington Family, University Hospitals of Cleveland, Takeda Pharmaceutical Company, Biogen, Arix Bioscience, and Charles River Laboratories.

== Leadership ==
Ron Harrington, BioMotiv's Board of Managers Chairman and The Harrington Project's lead, led Edgepark Medical Supplies and after growing the business successfully, sold the company in 2011 to Goldman Sachs and Clayton, Dubilier & Rice (which renamed the company AssuraMed and sold it again in 2014 to Cardinal Health, Inc.).

BioMotiv recruited Baiju Shah, former CEO of BioEnterprise, a non-profit aimed at boosting Cleveland's healthcare economy, to lead its efforts. Prior to founding BioEnterprise, Baiju worked at McKinsey & Company.

Ted Torphy is BioMotiv's Chief Scientific Officer. Prior to BioMotiv, he served as Global Head of External Innovation & Business Models for Discovery Sciences, Vice President and Head of External Research and Early Development, and Corporate Vice President and Head of Johnson & Johnson's Corporate Office of Science & Technology.

David C. U'Prichard is the Chairman of the Advisory Board; he has served on a number of biotechnology boards, as a venture partner at several funds, and was Chairman of Research and Development at SmithKline Beecham.

== Subsidiaries ==
BioMotiv launched its first subsidiary company, Orca Pharmaceuticals, in 2013. Based in Oxford, England, it worked in collaboration with New York University Innovation Venture Fund to develop RAR-related orphan receptor gamma (RORy) inhibitors for treatments of psoriasis, ankylosing spondylitis, and inflammatory bowel disease.

Today, BioMotiv's subsidiary portfolio includes ten companies across five indication areas:

Company	Indication	Source Institution
Allinaire Therapeutics	Cardiology	Indiana University
Dual Therapeutics	Cancer	Mt. Sinai School of Medicine Case Western Reserve University
Kodosil	Immunology	BioAtla
Koutif Therapeutics	Immunology	University of Pittsburgh
Nynex Therapeutics	Cancer	University of Michigan
Optikira	Neurology	University of California, San Francisco University of Washington
Orca Therapeutics	Immunology	New York University
SapVax	Cancer	University of Auckland
Sujana	Cardiovascular	Case Western Reserve University Cleveland Clinic
Inclera	Various	Indiana University University of Pennsylvania

== See also ==
- Medical Research
- Translational Research
- Biotechnology
