= Saville reaction =

Chemical reaction

The Saville reaction is a chemical reaction in which mercury replaces a nitrosyl from a thiol group.

It is used as a method of replacing the nitrosyl from the modified cysteines and thus can serve in research of the redox modification of different proteins.
