= University Hospitals Cleveland Medical Center =

Coordinates: 41°30′19″N 81°36′31″W

- University Hospitals
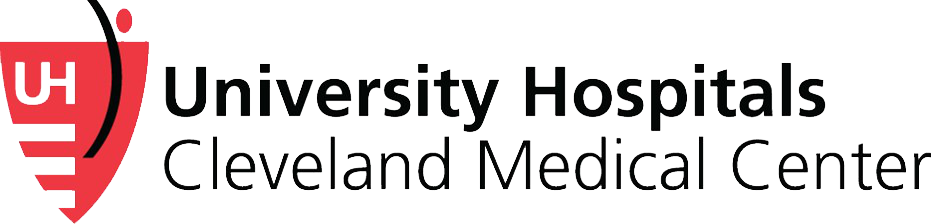

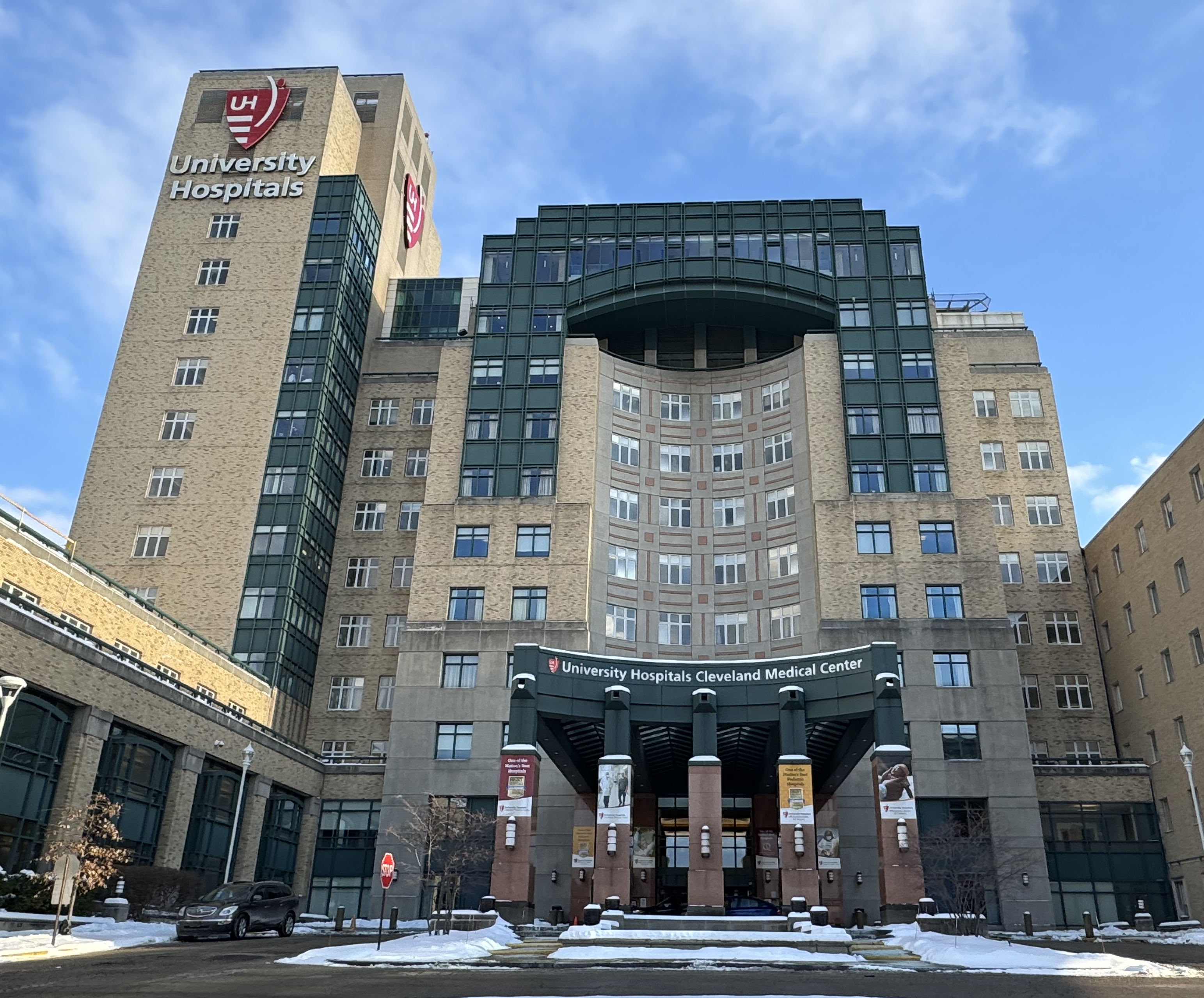
- Front view of Lerner Tower

Geography
- Location: 11100 Euclid Avenue, Cleveland, Ohio, United States

Organization
- Care system: Private
- Type: Teaching
- Affiliated university: Case Western Reserve University School of Medicine; Northeast Ohio Medical University

Services
- Emergency department: Level I trauma center
- Beds: 1,032
- Speciality: Multispecialty

History
- Founded: 1866

Links
- Website: http://www.uhhospitals.org
- Lists: Hospitals in Ohio
- Other links: List of hospitals in the United States

University Hospitals Cleveland Medical Center (UH Cleveland Medical Center), formerly known as University Hospitals Case Medical Center (UH Case Medical Center), is a large not-for-profit academic medical complex in Cleveland, Ohio, United States.

UH Cleveland Medical Center is the main campus of University Hospitals. With 150 locations throughout the Cleveland metropolitan area, the University Hospitals health system encompasses hospitals, outpatient centers, and primary care clinics.

University Hospitals Cleveland Medical Center is the main teaching hospital of Case Western Reserve University. It also has an affiliation with the Northeast Ohio Medical University.

== Locations ==
The main campus of the University Hospitals system is UH Cleveland Medical Center in the University Circle neighborhood of Cleveland, neighboring both Case Western Reserve University and the Cleveland Clinic to the west. The UH Cleveland Medical Center complex comprises the Alfred and Norma Lerner Tower, Samuel Mather Pavilion, Lakeside Hospital, Rainbow Babies & Children's Hospital, MacDonald Women's Hospital, Seidman Cancer Center, and Hanna Pavilion. In addition to the main campus, UH provides hospital services at 11 regional locations throughout Northeast Ohio.

Main Campus

- UH Cleveland Medical Center ("Lakeside", "Bolwell", "Humphrey", "Mather")
- UH Rainbow Babies & Children's Hospital ("Rainbow")
- UH Seidman Cancer Center ("Seidman")
- UH MacDonald Women's Hospital ("MacDonald")

Regional Hospitals

- UH Ahuja Medical Center - Beachwood
- UH Beachwood Medical Center - Beachwood (former Lake Health)
- UH Conneaut Medical Center - Conneaut
- UH Elyria Medical Center - Elyria
- UH Geauga Medical Center - Chardon
- UH Geneva Medical Center - Geneva
- UH Lake West Medical Center - Willoughby (former Lake Health)
- UH Parma Medical Center - Parma
- UH Portage Medical Center - Ravenna
- UH Samaritan Medical Center - Ashland
- UH St. John Medical Center - Westlake
- UH TriPoint Medical Center - Painesville (former Lake Health)

On April 16, 2021, University Hospitals acquired nearby Lake Health, which operated 10+ facilities.

=== Former Hospitals ===
- Crile General Hospital - Cleveland (changed affiliation to VA)
- Lakeside Hospital - Cleveland
- UH St. Michael Hospital - Cleveland
- UH Marymount Hospital - Garfield Heights (changed affiliation and merged with Cleveland Clinic)
- UH Richmond Medical Center - Richmond Heights, where inpatient psychiatry was previously housed
- UH Bedford Medical Center - Bedford

== Rankings ==
- UH Cleveland Medical Center is ranked in the top 25 nationally in Ear, Nose & Throat; Gastroenterology & GI Surgery, Gynecology; Nephrology; and Neurology & Neurosurgery.
- Rainbow Babies & Children's Hospital, is ranked #6 nationally for Neonatal Care by the U.S. News & World Report.
- Among UH Rainbow pediatric specialties, Neonatology, Pulmonology, Diabetes & Endocrinology, Orthopedics, Cancer, and Urology are ranked among the top 25 in the nation.
- Cleveland Medical Center and Case School of Medicine together form the largest biomedical research center in Ohio.
- In biomedical research, Case Medical Center ranks among top 15 centers in the United States with approximately $75 million in annual extramural research funding and a further $20 million in various clinical trials.
- University Hospitals Cleveland Medical Center also includes MacDonald Women's Hospital, Ohio's only hospital for women; and Seidman Cancer Center (formerly known as Ireland Cancer Center).

== Vision 2010 ==
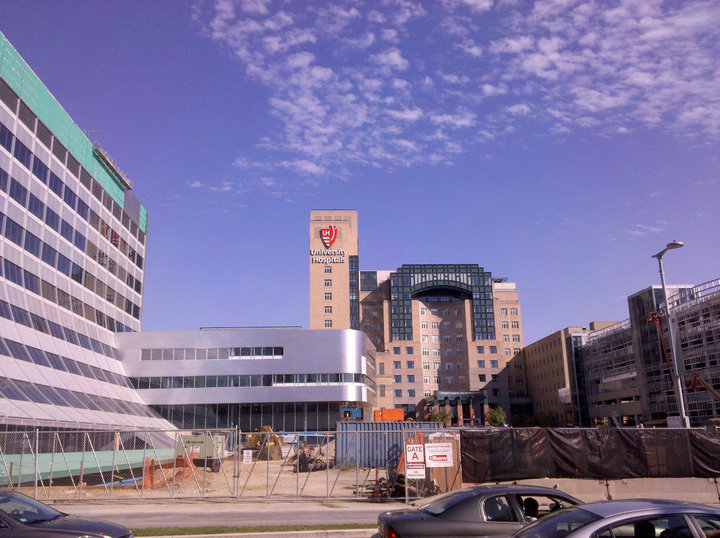
Facilities under construction in 2010

Vision 2010 was the largest construction and upgrade project in the history of University Hospitals. New construction included a new 200-bed cancer hospital (UH Seidman Cancer Center), upgraded emergency room facilities at CMC, a new neonatal intensive care unit (NICU) at Rainbow Babies & Children's Hospital, and new construction at other hospital sites. The capital expenditure for this project, according to hospital press releases, was to be approximately US$1 billion. Construction was originally due to be completed by the year 2010, but was not scheduled completed until 2011.

== Harrington Project ==
The Harrington Project for Discovery & Development, launched in 2012, is a $300 million initiative at the University Hospitals whose purpose is to speed the delivery of new drugs and enhance the medical reputations of Cleveland and the Hospitals. It was established through a $50 million gift from the Harrington family and an additional $100 million in support from University Hospitals. The project has three components, the Harrington Discovery Institute (HDI), the Innovation Support Center (ISC), and Biomotiv.

In June 2014, the Harrington Discovery Institute received a $25 million grant from the State of Ohio through the Third Frontier economic development program to further its mission.

== Notable alumni and faculty ==
- George Washington Crile (1910-1924 Chair of Surgery) - Performed first blood transfusion. Established Lakeside Hospital, and later co-founded Cleveland Clinic
- Claude Beck (Surgery residency alum; 1924 -1971 Professor of Cardiovascular Surgery - first such position in US)
  - Performed first surgical treatment of coronary artery disease (1935).
  - Performed first defibrillation using machine he built with James Rand (1947)
  - Developed concept of Beck's Triad
  - Started the first CPR teaching course for medical professionals (1950).
- Peter C. Agre (1978 Internal Medicine alumnus) - co-recipient 2003 Nobel Prize in Chemistry for discoveries that have clarified how salts and water are transported out of and into the cells of the body, leading to a better understanding of many diseases of the kidneys, heart, muscles and nervous system.
- Alfredo Palacio (Internal Medicine alumnus) - President of Ecuador (2005–2007)
- Peter Pronovost - intensive care physician known globally for his work on patient safety

== In popular culture ==
- In 2015, the cable network NatGeo broadcast Brain Surgery Live from UH Cleveland Medical Center, the first brain surgery ever televised live in the United States.
- In 2017, Roger Daltrey of The Who visited cancer patients at the Angie Fowler Adolescent and Young Adult Cancer Institute at UH Rainbow Babies & Children's Hospital, part of University Hospitals.
- In 2018, the nationally syndicated program The Doctors featured an in-utero cardiac procedure performed at University Hospitals.

== Controversy ==
University Hospitals faced multiple lawsuits following an incident in March 2018 at its Fertility Center that compromised 4,000+ eggs and embryos stored in liquid nitrogen as the result of an unexpected temperature fluctuation with a tissue cryo storage tank.

In 2021, amid the COVID-19 pandemic, University Hospitals required all workers to be vaccinated against the disease. It later permitted its careworkers to be unvaccinated against COVID due to a federal injunction. The mandate was reinstated following a Supreme Court ruling.

== See also ==
- Rainbow Babies & Children's Hospital
- Case Western Reserve University School of Medicine
- Cleveland Clinic
- Medical centers in the United States
