= Nitroso =

Class of functional groups with a –N=O group attached

Structural formula of nitroso group

In organic chemistry, nitroso refers to a functional group in which the nitric oxide (−N=O) group is attached to an organic moiety. As such, various nitroso groups can be categorized as C-nitroso compounds (e.g., nitrosoalkanes; R−N=O), S-nitroso compounds (nitrosothiols; RS−N=O), N-nitroso compounds (e.g., nitrosamines, RN(−R’)−N=O), and O-nitroso compounds (alkyl nitrites; RO−N=O).

== Synthesis ==
Nitroso compounds can be prepared by the reduction of nitro compounds or oxidation of hydroxylamines or oximes. Ortho-nitrosophenols may be produced by the Baudisch reaction. In the Fischer–Hepp rearrangement, aromatic 4-nitrosoanilines are prepared from the corresponding nitrosamines.

== Properties ==
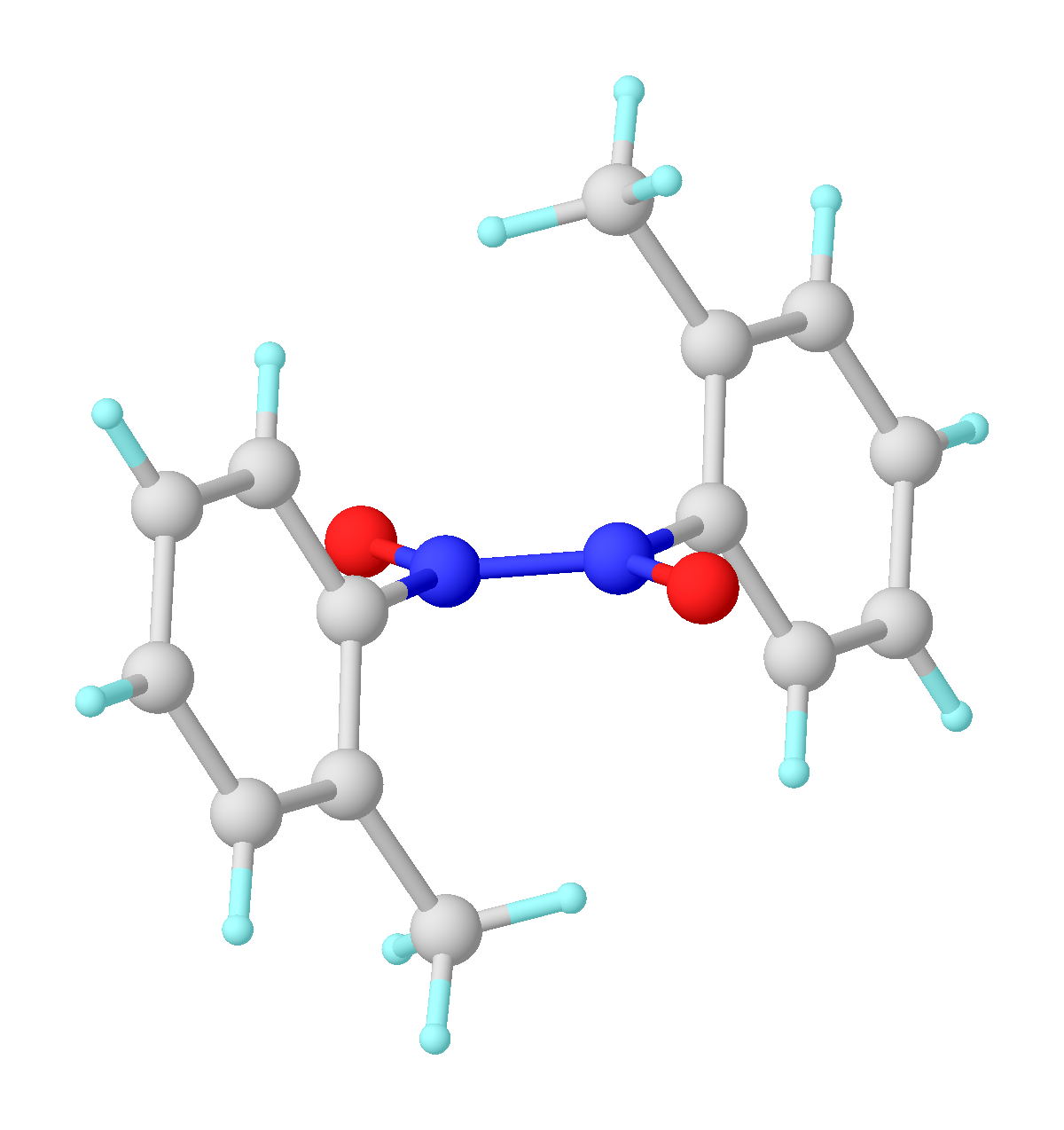
Structure of 2-nitrosotoluene dimer

Nitrosoarenes typically participate in a monomer–dimer equilibrium. The azobenzene N,N'-dioxide (Ar(^{–}O)N^{+}=^{+}N(O^{–})Ar) dimers, which are often pale yellow, are generally favored in the solid state, whereas the deep-green monomers are favored in dilute solution or at higher temperatures. They exist as cis and trans isomers. The central "double bond" in the dimer in fact has a bond order of about 1.5.

When stored in protic media, primary and secondary nitrosoalkanes isomerize to oximes. Some tertiary nitrosoalkanes also isomerize to oximes through C-C bond fission, particularly if the bond is electron-poor. Nitrosophenols and naphthols isomerize to the oxime quinone in solution, but reversibly; nitrosophenol ethers typically dealkylate to facilitate the isomerization. Nitroso tertiary anilines generally do not dealkylate in that way.

Due to the stability of the nitric oxide free radical, nitroso organyls tend to have very low C–N bond dissociation energies: nitrosoalkanes have BDEs on the order of 30–40 kcal/mol (130–170 kJ/mol), while nitrosoarenes have BDEs on the order of 50–60 kcal/mol (210–250 kJ/mol). As a consequence, they are generally heat- and light-sensitive. Compounds containing O–(NO) or N–(NO) bonds generally have even lower bond dissociation energies. For instance, N-nitrosodiphenylamine, Ph_{2}N–N=O, has a N–N bond dissociation energy of only 23 kcal/mol (96 kJ/mol).

Organonitroso compounds serve as a ligands giving transition metal nitroso complexes.

== Reactions ==
Many reactions make use of an intermediate nitroso compound, such as the Barton reaction and Davis–Beirut reaction, as well as the synthesis of indoles, for example: Baeyer–Emmerling indole synthesis, Bartoli indole synthesis. In the Saville reaction, mercury is used to replace a nitrosyl from a thiol group.

C-nitroso compounds are used in organic synthesis as synthons in some well-documented chemical reactions such as hetero Diels-Alder (HDA), nitroso-ene and nitroso-aldol reactions.

== Nitrosyl in inorganic chemistry ==
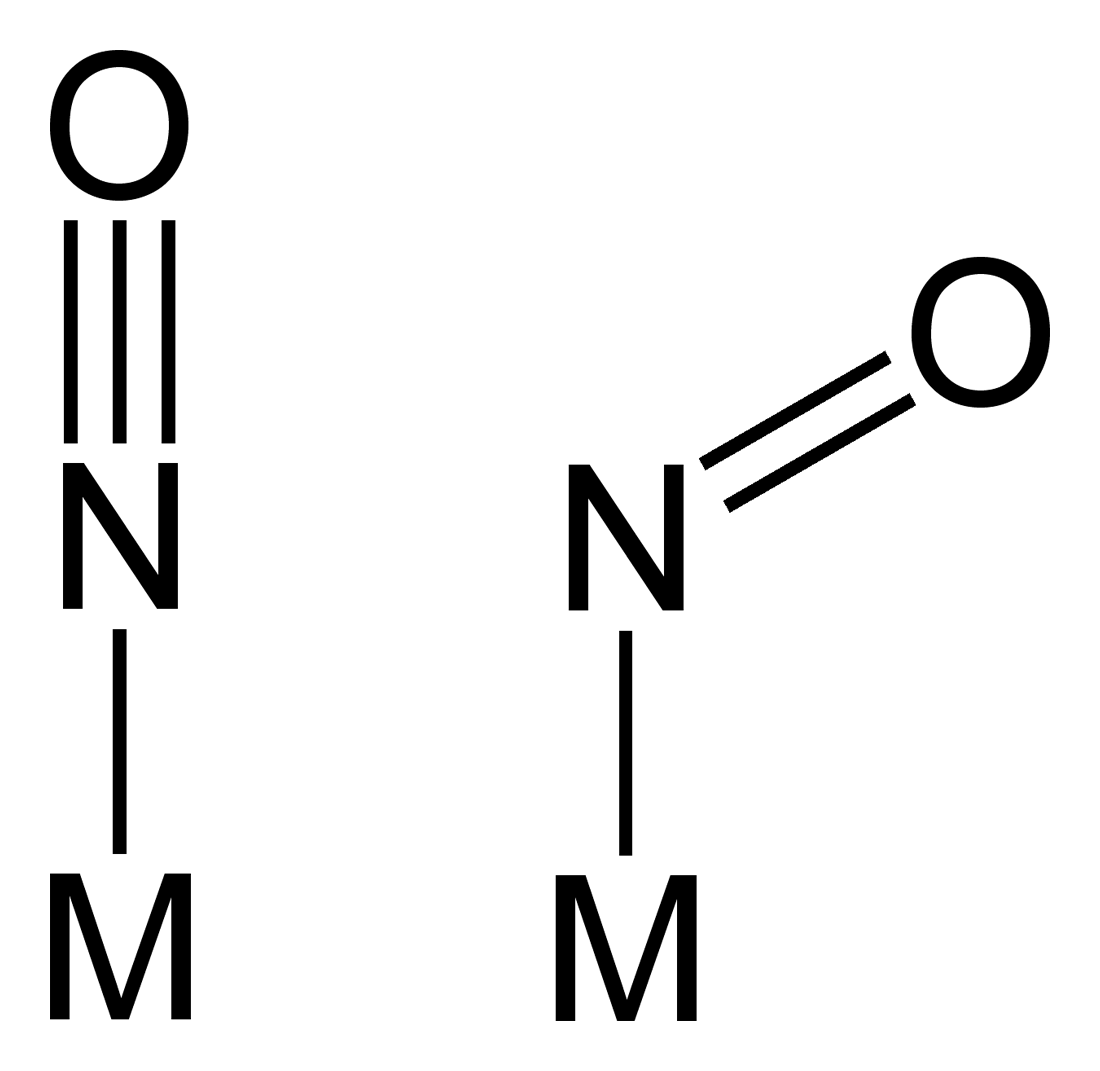
Linear and bent metal nitrosyls

Nitrosyls are non-organic compounds containing the NO group, for example directly bound to the metal via the N atom, giving a metal–NO moiety. Alternatively, a nonmetal example is the common reagent nitrosyl chloride (Cl−N=O). Nitric oxide is a stable radical, having an unpaired electron. Reduction of nitric oxide gives the nitrosyl anion, NO^{−}:

NO + e^{−} → NO^{−}

Oxidation of NO yields the nitrosonium cation, NO^{+}:

NO → NO^{+} + e^{−}

Nitric oxide can serve as a ligand forming metal nitrosyl complexes or just metal nitrosyls. These complexes can be viewed as adducts of NO^{+}, NO^{−}, or some intermediate case.

== In human health ==
Nitroso compounds react with primary amines in acidic environments to form nitrosamines, which human metabolism converts to mutagenic diazo compounds. Small amounts of nitro and nitroso compounds form during meat curing; the toxicity of these compounds preserves the meat against bacterial infection. After curing completes, the concentration of these compounds appears to degrade over time. Their presence in finished products has been tightly regulated since several food-poisoning cases in the early 20th century, but consumption of large quantities of processed meats can still cause a slight elevation in gastric and oesophageal cancer risk today.

For example, during the 1970s, certain Norwegian farm animals began exhibiting elevated levels of liver cancer. These animals had been fed herring meal preserved with sodium nitrite. The sodium nitrite had reacted with dimethylamine in the fish and produced dimethylnitrosamine.

The effects of nitroso compounds vary dramatically across the gastrointestinal tract, and with diet. Nitroso compounds present in stool do not induce nitrosamine formation, because stool has neutral pH. Stomach acid catalyzes nitrosamine compound formation and is the main location of the reaction during digestion.

The formation process is inhibited when amine concentration is low (e.g. a low-protein diet or no fermented food). The process may also be inhibited in the case of high vitamin C (ascorbic acid) or erythorbic acid concentration (e.g. high-fruit diet). However, when 10% of the meal is fat, the effect reverses, and ascorbic acid markedly increases nitrosamine formation. Vitamin C and erythorbic acid are already commonly used in the meat industry because they enhance the binding of nitrite to myoglobin, encouraging the formation of the desired pink color.

== See also ==
- Nitrosamine, the functional group with the NO attached to an amine, such as R_{2}N–NO
- Nitrosobenzene
- Nitric oxide
- Nitroxyl
