= Molten salt =

Salt that has melted, often by heating to high temperatures

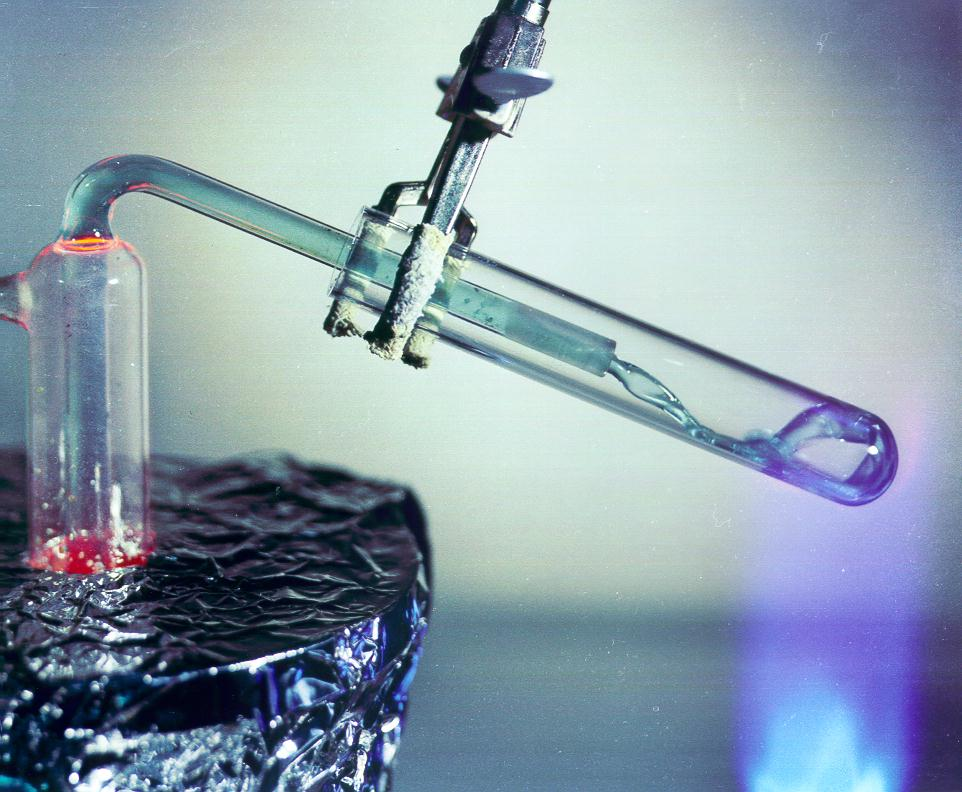
Molten FLiBe (2LiF·BeF_{2})

Molten salt is salt which is solid at standard temperature and pressure but liquefied due to elevated temperature. A salt that is liquid even at standard temperature and pressure is usually called a room-temperature ionic liquid, and molten salts are technically a class of ionic liquids.

== Examples ==
As a reference, molten sodium chloride, table salt, has a melting point (m.p.) of 801 °C (1,474 °F). A variety of eutectic mixtures have been developed with lower melting points:

=== Chlorides ===
- Lithium chloride and potassium chloride, m.p. 450 °C (842 °F).

=== Nitrates ===
Alkali metal nitrates are relatively low melting and thermally stable. The least stable, LiNO_{3} (m.p. 255 °C (491 °F)) decomposes only at 474 °C (885 °F). At the other extreme, cesium nitrate melts at 414 °C (777 °F) and decomposes at 584 °C.

- 60:40 mixture of sodium nitrate and potassium nitrate is a liquid between 260 and 550 °C (500 and 1,022 °F). It has a heat of fusion of 161 J/g, and a heat capacity of 1.53 J/(g·K).
- 1:1 mixture LiNO_{3}:KNO_{3}, m.p. 125 °C (257 °F).
- 40:7:53 NaNO_{2}:NaNO_{3}:KNO_{3}, m. p. 142 °C (288 °F), stable to 600 °C (1,112 °F).

== Uses ==
Molten salts have a variety of uses.

=== Production of magnesium and aluminium ===
One industrial application is the production of magnesium, which begins with production of magnesium chloride by chlorination of magnesium oxide:

MgO + C + Cl_{2} → MgCl_{2} + CO

Electrolysis of the resulting molten magnesium chloride is conducted at 700 °C (1,292 °F):

MgCl_{2} → Mg + Cl_{2}

Aluminium metal is produced from aluminium oxides by electrolysis of a molten mixture of sodium hexafluoroaluminate and alumina at 950 °C (1,740 °F). This conversion is called the Hall-Héroult process.

=== Heat transfer ===
Molten salts (fluoride, chloride, and nitrate) can be used as heat transfer fluids as well as for thermal storage. This thermal storage is used in concentrated solar power plants.

Molten-salt reactors are a type of nuclear reactor that uses molten salt(s) as a coolant or as a solvent in which the fissile material is dissolved. Experimental salts using lithium can be formed that have a melting point of 116 °C while still having a heat capacity of 1.54 J/(g·K).

=== Other uses ===
Molten chloride salt mixtures are commonly used as quenching baths for various alloy heat treatments, such as annealing and martempering of steel. Cyanide and chloride salt mixtures are used for surface modification of alloys such as carburizing and nitrocarburizing of steel.

Cryolite (a fluoride salt) is used as a solvent for aluminium oxide in the production of aluminium in the Hall-Héroult process.

Fluoride, chloride, and hydroxide salts can be used as solvents in pyroprocessing of nuclear fuel.

== Ambient-temperature molten salts ==
Ambient-temperature molten salts (also known as ionic liquids) are present in the liquid phase at standard conditions for temperature and pressure. Examples of such salts include N-ethylpyridinium bromide and aluminium chloride mix, discovered in 1951, and ethylammonium nitrate discovered by Paul Walden. Other ionic liquids take advantage of asymmetrical quaternary ammonium cations like alkylated imidazolium ions, and large, branched anions like the bistriflimide ion.

== See also ==
- Electromagnetic pump
- Ionic liquid
- Molten-salt battery
- Molten salt oxidation
- Molten-salt reactor
- Parabolic trough
- United States Department of Energy International Energy Storage Database

== Bibliography ==
- C.F. Baes, The chemistry and thermodynamics of molten salt reactor fuels, Proc. AIME Nuclear Fuel Reprocessing Symposium, Ames, Iowa, USA, 1969 (August 25), doi:10.1016/0022-3115(74)90124-X
