= Potassium nitrate (data page) =

Chemical data page

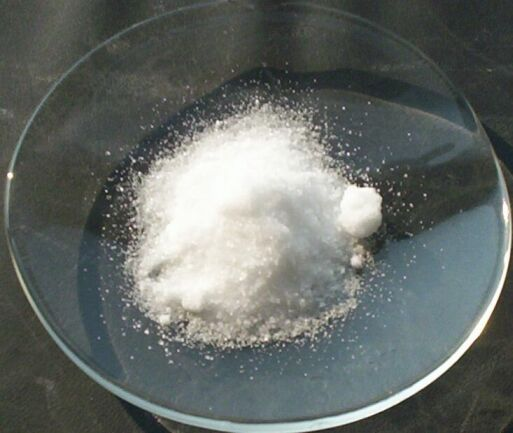
Potassium nitrate.

Potassium nitrate is an oxidizer so storing it near fire hazards or reducing agents should be avoided to minimise risk in case of a fire.

== Product Identification ==
Synonyms: Saltpetre; Niter/Nitre; Nitric acid potassium salt; Salt Peter
CAS No.: 7757-79-1
Molecular Weight: 101.1
Chemical Formula: KNO_{3}

== Hazards Identification ==
Emergency Overview
Danger - oxidizer. Contact with some materials may cause fire. Harmful if swallowed, inhaled or absorbed through the skin. Causes irritation to skin, eyes and respiratory tract.

SAF-T-DATA Ratings

Health Rating: 1 - Minimal
Flammability Rating: 0 - None
Reactivity Rating: 2 - Moderate (Oxidizer)
Contact Rating: 1 - Minimal (Life)
Lab Protective Equip: Safety goggles and surgical face mask (If you are planning to encounter this material close up for a period of time). Gloves optional.
Storage Color Code: Yellow (Reactive)

Potential Health Effects

Inhalation: Causes irritation to the respiratory tract. Symptoms may include coughing, shortness of breath.
Ingestion: Causes irritation to the gastrointestinal tract. Symptoms may include nausea, vomiting and diarrhea. May cause gastroenteritis and abdominal pains. Purging and diuresis can be expected. Rare cases of nitrates being converted to the more toxic nitrites have been reported, mostly with infants.
Skin Contact: Causes irritation to skin. Symptoms include redness, itching, and pain.
Eye Contact: Causes irritation, redness, and pain.
Chronic Exposure: Under some circumstances methemoglobinemia occurs in individuals when the nitrate is converted by bacteria in the stomach to nitrite. Nausea, vomiting, dizziness, rapid heart beat, irregular breathing, convulsions, coma, and death can occur should this conversion take place. Chronic exposure to nitrites may cause anemia and adverse effects to kidney.

== First Aid Measures ==
Inhalation:none
Skin Contact: none
Eye Contact: Flush eyes with water, lifting lower and upper eyelids occasionally.

== Fire Fighting Measures ==
Fire: Not combustible itself but substance is a strong oxidizer and its heat of reaction with reducing agents or combustibles may accelerate burning.
Explosion: No danger of explosion. KNO_{3} is an oxidising agent, so will accelerate combustion of combustibles.
Fire Extinguishing Media: Dry chemical, carbon dioxide, Halon, water spray, or fog. If water is used, apply from as far a distance as possible. Water spray may be used to keep fire exposed containers cool. Do not allow water runoff to enter sewers or waterways.
Special Information: Wear full protective clothing and breathing equipment for high-intensity fire or potential explosion conditions. This oxidizing material can increase the flammability of adjacent combustible materials.

== Accidental Release Measures ==
Remove all sources of ignition. Ventilate area of leak or spill. Wear appropriate personal protective equipment as specified in Section 8. Spills: Clean up spills in a manner that does not disperse dust into the air. Use non-sparking tools and equipment. Reduce airborne dust and prevent scattering by moistening with water. Pick up spill for recovery or disposal and place in a closed container.

== Handling and Storage ==
Keep in a tightly closed container, stored in a cool, dry, ventilated area. Protect against physical damage and moisture. Isolate from any source of heat or ignition. Avoid storage on wood floors. Separate from incompatibles, combustibles, organic or other readily oxidizable materials.

== Exposure Controls/Personal Protection ==
Ventilation System: A system of local and/or general exhaust is recommended to keep employee exposures as low as possible. Local exhaust ventilation is generally preferred because it can control the emissions of the contaminant at its source, preventing dispersion of it into the general work area. Please refer to the ACGIH document, Industrial Ventilation, A Manual of Recommended Practices, most recent edition, for details.
Personal Respirators (NIOSH Approved): For conditions of use where exposure to dust or mist is apparent and engineering controls are not feasible, a particulate respirator (NIOSH type N95 or better filters) may be worn. If oil particles (e.g. lubricants, cutting fluids, glycerine, etc.) are present, use a NIOSH type R or P filter. For emergencies or instances where the exposure levels are not known, use a full-face positive-pressure, air-supplied respirator.
Skin Protection: Not required.
Eye Protection: Not required. Optionally use chemical safety goggles where dusting or splashing of solutions is possible.

== Physical and Chemical Properties ==
Appearance: White crystals.
Odor: sour or salty.
Solubility: 36 gm/100 ml water
Specific Gravity: 2.1
pH: ca. 7
% Volatiles by volume @ 21C (70F): 0
Boiling Point: 400 °C (752 °F)
Melting Point: 333 °C (631 °F)
Vapor Density (Air=1): 3.00
Vapor Pressure (mm Hg): Negligible @ 20 °C

== Stability and Reactivity ==
Stability: Stable under ordinary conditions of use and storage. Hazardous Decomposition Products : Oxides of nitrogen and toxic metal fumes may form when heated to decomposition.
Hazardous Polymerization: Will not occur.
Incompatibilities: Heavy metals, phosphites, organic compounds, carbonaceous materials, strong acids, and many other substances.
Conditions to Avoid: Heat, flames, ignition sources and incompatibles.

== Disposal Considerations ==
Whatever cannot be saved for recovery or recycling should be handled as hazardous waste and sent to a RCRA approved waste facility. Processing, use or contamination of this product may change the waste management options. State and local disposal regulations may differ from federal disposal regulations. Dispose of container and unused contents in accordance with federal, state and local requirements.

This box:
- Except where noted otherwise, data relate to Standard temperature and pressure.
- Reliability of data general note.

== See also ==
- Potassium nitrate
- Nitric acid
- Niter
- Black powder
- Sodium nitrate
- Sodium nitrite
- Potassium nitrite
