= Sodium nitrite/sodium thiosulfate =

Combination drug

Combination of
- Sodium nitrite (medical use): Antidote
- Sodium thiosulfate (medical use): Antidote

Clinical data
- Trade names: Nithiodote
- AHFS/Drugs.com: Professional Drug Facts
- License data: US DailyMed: Sodium_nitrite_and_sodium_thiosulfate
- Routes of administration: Intravenous
- ATC code: None

Legal status
- Legal status: US: ℞-only

Identifiers
- PubChem CID: 56599290
- UNII: M0KG633D4F; HX1032V43M

Sodium nitrite/sodium thiosulfate, sold under the brand name Nithiodote, is a fixed-dose combination medication used as an antidote for cyanide poisoning. It contains sodium thiosulfate and sodium nitrite. It is given by intravenous infusion into a vein.

It was approved for medical use in the United States in January 2011.

== Medical uses ==
Sodium nitrite/sodium thiosulfate is indicated for the treatment of acute cyanide poisoning.

== See also ==
- Sodium nitrite
- Sodium thiosulfate
