= Barium nitrite =

Names
- Preferred IUPAC name Barium nitrite

Identifiers
CAS Number	13465-94-6 (anhydrous); 7787-38-4 (monohydrate)
3D model (JSmol)	Interactive image
ChemSpider	145952
ECHA InfoCard	100.033.358
EC Number	236-709-9
PubChem CID	166820
UNII	5N5G361962
CompTox Dashboard (EPA)	DTXSID30890698
- InChI: InChI=1S/Ba.2HNO2/c;2*2-1-3/h;2*(H,2,3)/q+2;;/p-2 Key: GJTDJAPHKDIQIQ-UHFFFAOYSA-L
- SMILES: N(=O)[O-].N(=O)[O-].[Ba+2]

Properties
Chemical formula	Ba(NO_{2})_{2}
Molar mass	229.34 g/mol
Appearance	white (anhydrous) white to yellowish (monohydrate)
Density	3.234 g/cm^{3} (anhydrous); 3.173 g/cm^{3} (monohydrate)
Melting point	267 °C (anhydrous) 217 °C decomposes (monohydrate)
Solubility in water	anhydrous 675 g/L (20 °C) monohydrate 548 g/L (0 °C); 3190 g/L (100 °C)
Solubility	anhydrous slightly soluble in ethanol monohydrate soluble in ethanol

Hazards
- Occupational safety and health (OHS/OSH)
Main hazards	Toxic
- GHS labelling
Pictograms	(GHS07: Exclamation mark)
Signal word	Warning
Hazard statements	H302, H332
Precautionary statements	P261, P264, P270, P271, P301+P317, P304+P340, P317, P330, P501

Related compounds
Related compounds	Sodium nitrite; Potassium nitrite
- Except where otherwise noted, data are given for materials in their standard state (at 25 °C [77 °F], 100 kPa). Infobox references

Barium nitrite is a chemical compound with the formula Ba(NO_{2})_{2}, the nitrous acid salt of barium. It is a water-soluble white to yellowish powder. It is used to prepare other metal nitrites, such as lithium nitrite.

== Synthesis ==
Barium nitrite can be prepared by reacting barium nitrate with lead metal sponge, or by reaction of lead nitrite with barium chloride.

The monohydrate can be crystallized from a stoichiometric solution of barium chloride and sodium nitrite.
