= Rubidium nitrate =

Chemical compound RbNO_{3}

- Rb^{+}(NO^{−}_{3})
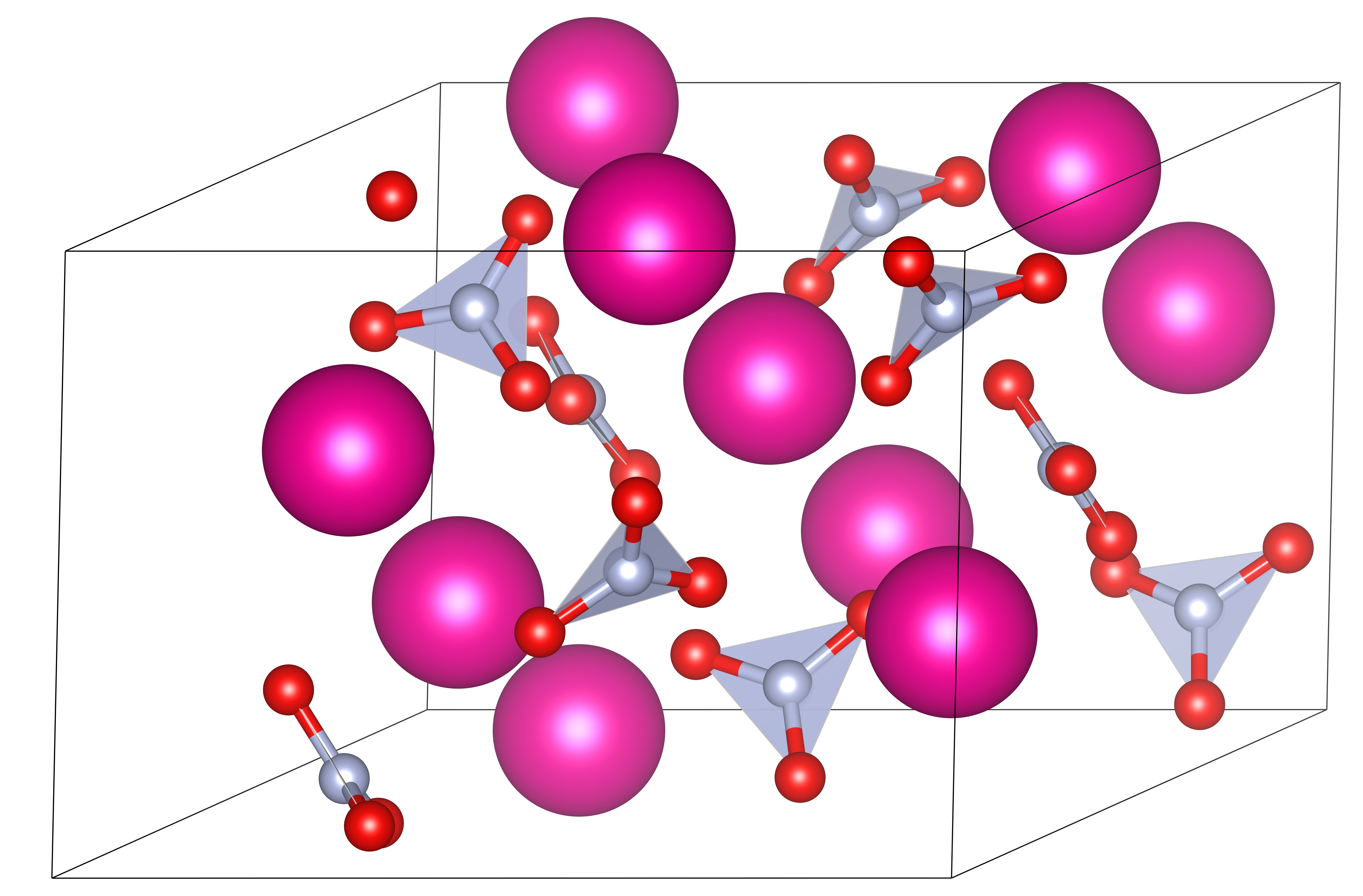
- Unit cell of rubidium nitrate

Names
- IUPAC name Rubidium nitrate

Identifiers
CAS Number	13126-12-0
3D model (JSmol)	Interactive image
ChemSpider	23971
ECHA InfoCard	100.032.767
EC Number	236-060-1
PubChem CID	25731
RTECS number	QV0900000
CompTox Dashboard (EPA)	DTXSID30884577
- InChI: InChI=1S/NO3.Rb/c2-1(3)4;/q-1;+1 Key: RTHYXYOJKHGZJT-UHFFFAOYSA-N; InChI=1S/NO3.Rb/c2-1(3)4;/q-1;+1 Key: RTHYXYOJKHGZJT-UHFFFAOYAE; Key: RTHYXYOJKHGZJT-UHFFFAOYSA-N
- SMILES: [Rb+].[O-][N+]([O-])=O

Properties
Chemical formula	RbNO_{3}
Molar mass	147.472 g·mol^{−1}
Appearance	White hygroscopic solid
Density	3.11 g/cm^{3}
Melting point	310 °C (590 °F; 583 K) decomposes
Boiling point	578 °C (1,072 °F; 851 K)
Solubility in water	44.28 g/100 mL (16 °C (61 °F)); 65.0 g/100 mL (25 °C (77 °F))
Solubility in acetone	very slightly soluble
Magnetic susceptibility (χ)	−41.0×10^{−6} cm^{3}/mol
Refractive index (n_{D})	1.524

Structure
Crystal structure	trigonal
Space group	P3_{1}
Lattice constant	a = 10.474 Å, c = 7.443 Å
Lattice volume (V)	707.2 Å^{3}

Hazards
- Occupational safety and health (OHS/OSH)
Main hazards	Oxidant
- GHS labelling
Pictograms	(GHS03: Oxidizing) (GHS07: Exclamation mark)
Signal word	Danger
Hazard statements	H272, H315, H319, H335
Precautionary statements	P210, P220, P261, P264, P264+P265, P271, P280, P302+P352, P304+P340, P305+P351+P338, P319, P321, P332+P317, P337+P317, P362+P364, P370+P378, P403+P233, P405, P501
NFPA 704 (fire diamond)	1 0 0 OX
Flash point	Non-flammable
- Lethal dose or concentration (LD, LC)
LD_{50} (median dose)	4625 mg/kg (rat, oral)

Related compounds
Other anions	Rubidium sulfate; Rubidium chloride
Other cations	Lithium nitrate; Sodium nitrate; Potassium nitrate; Caesium nitrate
- Except where otherwise noted, data are given for materials in their standard state (at 25 °C [77 °F], 100 kPa). verify (what is ?) Infobox references

Rubidium nitrate is an inorganic compound with the formula RbNO_{3}. This alkali metal nitrate salt is a white hygroscopic solid that is highly soluble in water.

== Properties ==
In a flame test, RbNO_{3} gives a mauve/light purple colour.

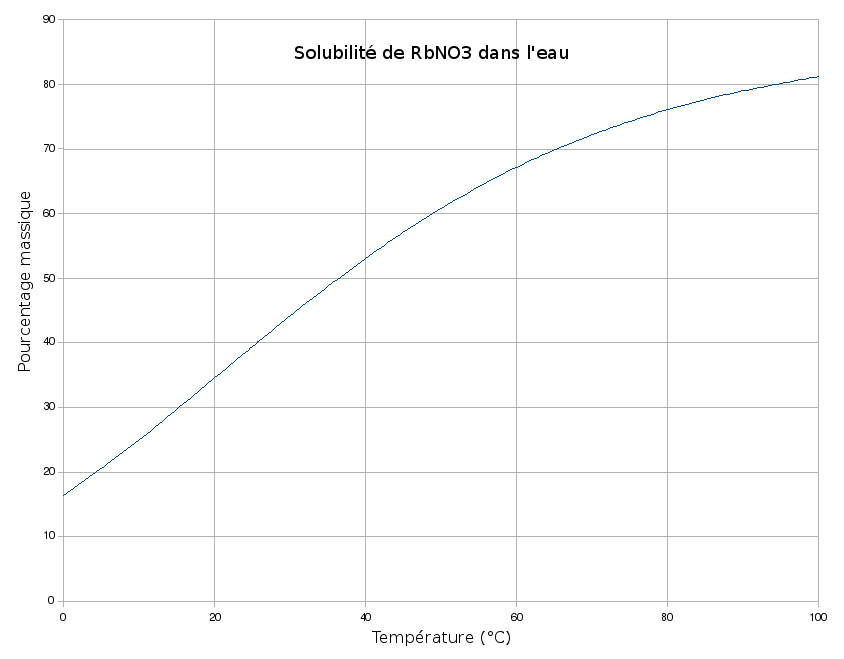
Solubility of rubidium nitrate in water

== Production ==
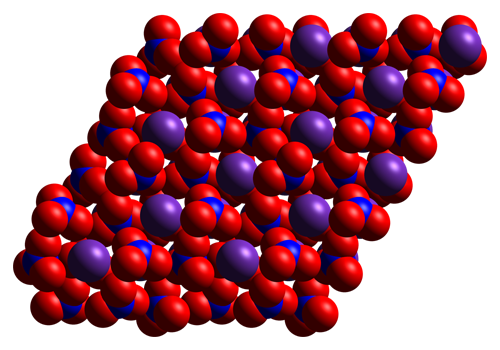
structure of solid rubidium nitrate

RbNO_{3} can be prepared either by dissolving rubidium metal, its hydroxide or carbonate in nitric acid.

RbOH + HNO_{3} → RbNO_{3} + H_{2}O
Rb_{2}CO_{3} + 2 HNO_{3} → 2 RbNO_{3} + CO_{2} + H_{2}O
2 Rb + 2 HNO_{3} → 2 RbNO_{3} + H_{2}

== Uses ==
Rubidium compounds have very few applications. Like caesium nitrate, it is used in infrared radiation optics. It is also used as a raw material for preparation of other rubidium compounds and rubidium metal, for manufacture of catalysts and in scintillation counters.
