= Potassium nitrate =

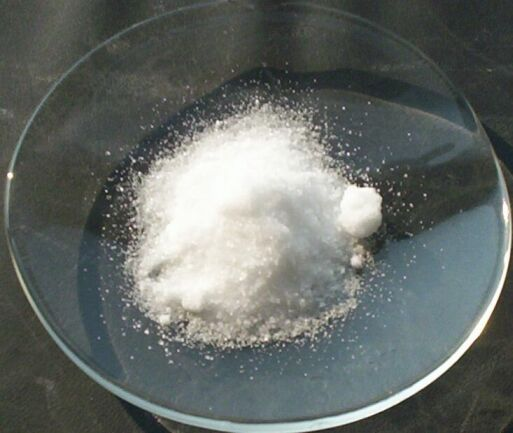
- Potassium nitrate

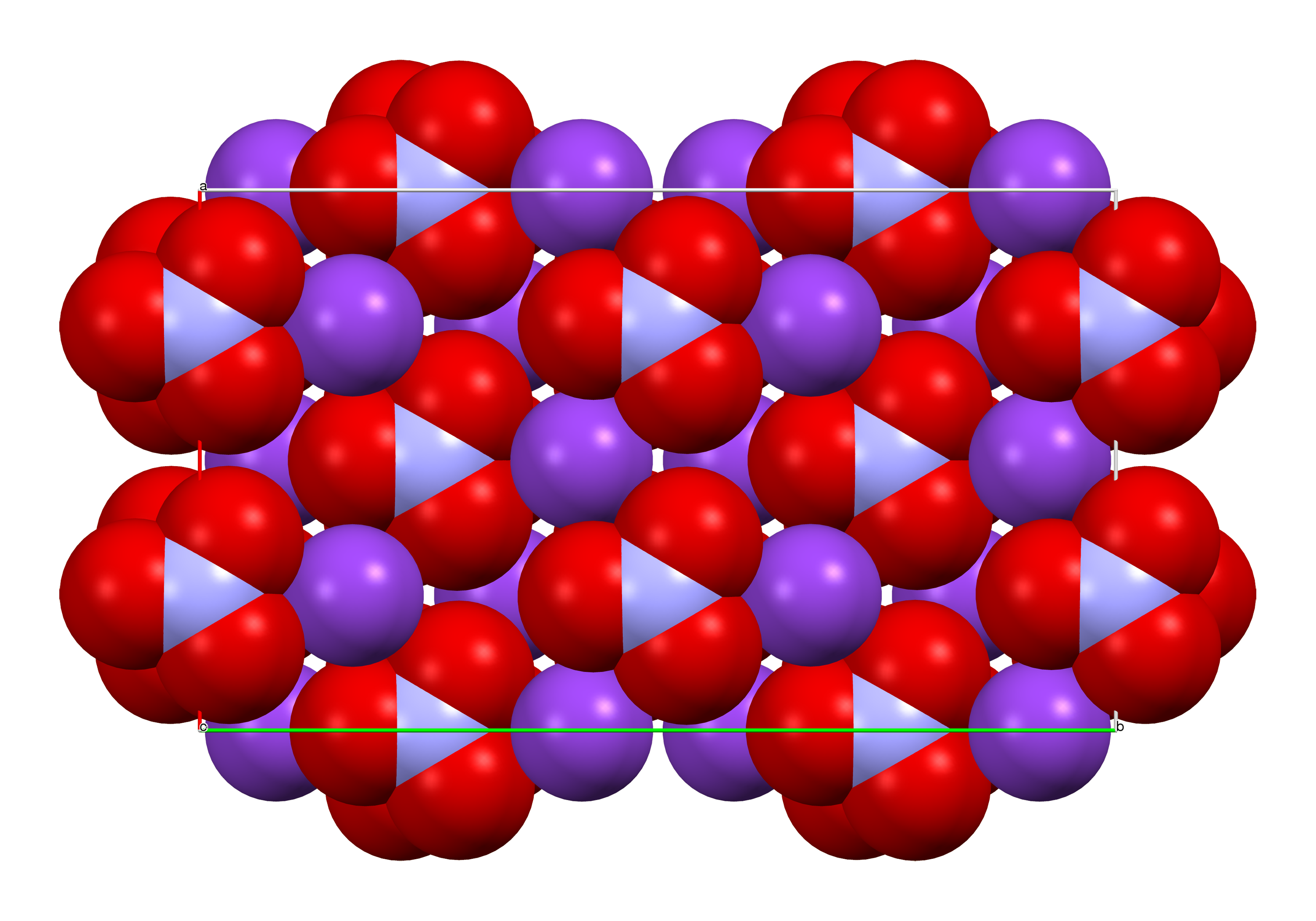

Names
- IUPAC name Potassium nitrate
- Other names: Saltpeter; Saltpetre; Indian Saltpetre; Nitrate of potash; Nitre

Identifiers
CAS Number	7757-79-1
3D model (JSmol)	Interactive image
ChEMBL	ChEMBL1644029
ChemSpider	22843
ECHA InfoCard	100.028.926
EC Number	231-818-8
E number	E252 (preservatives)
KEGG	D02051
PubChem CID	24434
RTECS number	TT3700000
UNII	RU45X2JN0Z
UN number	1486
CompTox Dashboard (EPA)	DTXSID4029692
- InChI: InChI=1S/K.NO3/c;2-1(3)4/q+1;-1 Key: FGIUAXJPYTZDNR-UHFFFAOYSA-N; InChI=1/K.NO3/c;2-1(3)4/q+1;-1 Key: FGIUAXJPYTZDNR-UHFFFAOYAM
- SMILES: [K+].[O-][N+]([O-])=O

Properties
Chemical formula	KNO_{3}
Molar mass	101.102 g·mol^{−1}
Appearance	white solid
Odor	odorless
Density	2.109 g/cm^{3} (16 °C (61 °F; 289 K))
Melting point	334 °C (633 °F; 607 K)
Boiling point	400 °C (752 °F; 673 K) (decomposes)
Solubility in water	133 g/L (0 °C (32 °F; 273 K)); 316 g/L (20 °C (68 °F; 293 K)); 383 g/L (25 °C (77 °F; 298 K)); 2439 g/L (100 °C (212 °F; 373 K))
Solubility	slightly soluble in ethanol soluble in glycerol, ammonia
Basicity (pK_{b})	15.3
Magnetic susceptibility (χ)	−33.7×10^{−6} cm^{3}/mol
Refractive index (n_{D})	1.335; 1.5056; 1.5604

Structure
Crystal structure	Orthorhombic, Aragonite

Thermochemistry
Heat capacity (C)	95.06 J⋅mol^{−1}·K^{-1}
Std enthalpy of formation (Δ_{f}H^{⦵}_{298})	−494.00 kJ⋅mol^{−1}

Hazards
- GHS labelling
Pictograms	(GHS03: Oxidizing) (GHS07: Exclamation mark)
Signal word	Warning
Hazard statements	H272
Precautionary statements	P210, P220, P221, P280, P370+P378, P501
NFPA 704 (fire diamond)	1 1 2 OX
Flash point	non-flammable (oxidizer)
- Lethal dose or concentration (LD, LC)
LD_{50} (median dose)	1901 mg/kg (oral, rabbit); 3750 mg/kg (oral, rat)
Safety data sheet (SDS)	ICSC 0184

Related compounds
Other anions	Potassium nitrite
Other cations	Lithium nitrate; Sodium nitrate; Calcium nitrate; Rubidium nitrate; Strontium nitrate; Silver nitrate; Caesium nitrate; Barium nitrate; Ammonium nitrate
Related compounds	Potassium chloride; Potassium sulfate

Supplementary data page
- Potassium nitrate (data page)
- Except where otherwise noted, data are given for materials in their standard state (at 25 °C [77 °F], 100 kPa). verify (what is ?) Infobox references

Potassium nitrate is a chemical compound with a sharp, salty, bitter taste and the chemical formula KNO_{3}. It is a potassium salt of nitric acid. This salt consists of potassium cations K^{+} and nitrate anions NO^{−}_{3}, and is therefore an alkali metal nitrate. It occurs in nature as a mineral, nitre (or niter in the United States). It is a source of nitrogen, and nitrogen was named after niter. Potassium nitrate is one of several nitrogen-containing compounds collectively referred to as saltpetre (or saltpeter in American English).

Major uses of potassium nitrate are in fertilizers, tree stump removal, rocket propellants and fireworks. It is one of the major constituents of traditional gunpowder (black powder). In processed meats, potassium nitrate reacts with hemoglobin and myoglobin generating a red color.

== Etymology ==
Nitre, or potassium nitrate, because of its early and global use and production, has many names.

As for nitrate, Egyptian and Hebrew words for it had the consonants n-t-r, indicating likely cognation in the Greek nitron, which was Latinised to nitrum or nitrium. Thence Old French had niter and Middle English nitre. By the 15th century, Europeans referred to it as saltpetre, specifically Indian saltpetre (Chilean saltpetre is sodium nitrate) and later as nitrate of potash, as the chemistry of the compound was more fully understood.

The Arabs called it "Chinese snow" (Arabic: ثلج الصين, romanized: thalj al-ṣīn) as well as bārūd (بارود), a term of uncertain origin that later came to mean gunpowder. It was called "Chinese salt" by the Iranians/Persians or "salt from Chinese salt marshes" (Persian: نمک شوره چينی namak shūra chīnī). The Tiangong Kaiwu, published in the 17th century by members of the Qing dynasty, detailed the production of gunpowder and other useful products from nitre.

== History ==
=== Saltpeter ===
Major natural sources of potassium nitrate were the deposits crystallizing from cave walls and the accumulations of bat guano in caves. Extraction is accomplished by immersing the guano in water for a day, filtering, and harvesting the crystals in the filtered water. Traditionally, guano was the source used in Laos for the manufacture of gunpowder for Bang Fai rockets.

Calcium nitrate, or lime saltpetre, was discovered on the walls of stables, from the urine of barnyard animals.

In Mauryan India saltpeter manufacturers formed the Nuniya & Labana caste. Saltpeter finds mention in Kautilya's Arthashastra (compiled 300 BCE – 300 CE), which mentions using its poisonous smoke as a weapon of war, although its use for propulsion did not appear until medieval times.

=== Purification and production ===
A purification process for potassium nitrate was outlined in 1270 by the chemist and engineer Hasan al-Rammah of Syria in his book al-Furusiyya wa al-Manasib al-Harbiyya (The Book of Military Horsemanship and Ingenious War Devices). In this book, al-Rammah describes first the purification of barud (crude saltpeter mineral) by boiling it with minimal water and using only the hot solution, then the use of potassium carbonate (in the form of wood ashes) to remove calcium and magnesium by precipitation of their carbonates from this solution, leaving a solution of purified potassium nitrate, which could then be dried. This was used for the manufacture of gunpowder and explosive devices. The terminology used by al-Rammah indicated the gunpowder he wrote about originated in China.

At least as far back as 1845, nitratite deposits were exploited in Chile and California.

==== Nitraries ====
Potassium nitrate was produced in a nitrary or "saltpetre works". The process involved burial of excrements (human or animal) in a field beside the nitraries, watering them and waiting until leaching allowed saltpeter to migrate to the surface by efflorescence. Operators then gathered the resulting powder and transported it to be concentrated by ebullition in the boiler plant.

Besides "Montepellusanus", during the thirteenth century (and beyond) the only supply of saltpeter across Christian Europe (according to "De Alchimia" in 3 manuscripts of Michael Scot, 1180–1236) was "found in Spain in Aragon in a certain mountain near the sea".

In 1561, Elizabeth I, Queen of England, who was at war with Philip II of Spain, became unable to import saltpeter (of which the Kingdom of England had no home production), and had to pay "300 pounds gold" to the German captain Gerrard Honrik for the manual "Instructions for making saltpeter to growe" (the secret of the "Feuerwerkbuch" -the nitraries-).

==== Nitre bed ====
A nitre bed is a similar process used to produce nitrate from excrement. Unlike the leaching-based process of the nitrary, however, one mixes the excrements with soil and waits for soil microbes to convert amino-nitrogen into nitrates by nitrification. The nitrates are extracted from soil with water and then purified into saltpeter by adding wood ash. The process was discovered in the early 15th century and was very widely used until the Chilean mineral deposits were found.

The Confederate side of the American Civil War had a significant shortage of saltpeter. As a result, the Nitre and Mining Bureau was set up to encourage local production, including by nitre beds and by providing excrement to government nitraries. On November 13, 1862, the government advertised in the Charleston Daily Courier for 20 or 30 "able bodied Negro men" to work in the new nitre beds at Ashley Ferry, S.C. The nitre beds were large rectangles of rotted manure and straw, moistened weekly with urine, "dung water", and liquid from privies, cesspools and drains, and turned over regularly. The National Archives published payroll records that account for more than 29,000 people compelled to such labor in the state of Virginia. The South was so desperate for saltpeter for gunpowder that one Alabama official reportedly placed a newspaper ad asking that the contents of chamber pots be saved for collection. In South Carolina, in April 1864, the Confederate government forced 31 enslaved people to work at the Ashley Ferry Nitre Works, outside Charleston.

Perhaps the most exhaustive discussion of the niter-bed production is the 1862 text by Joseph LeConte. He was writing with the express purpose of increasing production in the Confederate States to support their needs during the American Civil War. Since he was calling for the assistance of rural farming communities, the descriptions and instructions are both simple and explicit. He details the "French Method", along with several variations, as well as a "Swiss method".

==== French method ====
Turgot and Lavoisier created the Régie des Poudres et Salpêtres a few years before the French Revolution. Niter-beds were prepared by mixing manure with either mortar or wood ashes, common earth and organic materials such as straw to give porosity to a compost pile typically 4 feet (1.2 m) high, 6 feet (1.8 m) wide, and 15 feet (4.6 m) long. The heap was usually under a cover from the rain, kept moist with urine, turned often to accelerate the decomposition, then finally leached with water after approximately one year, to remove the soluble calcium nitrate which was then converted to potassium nitrate by filtering through potash.

==== Swiss method ====
LeConte describes a process using only urine and not dung, saying it is "practiced by the small farmers in Switzerland". Urine is collected directly, in a sandpit under a stable. The sand itself is dug out and leached for nitrates which are then converted to potassium nitrate using potash, as above.

==== From nitric acid ====
From 1903 until the World War I era, potassium nitrate for black powder and fertilizer was produced on an industrial scale from nitric acid produced using the Birkeland–Eyde process, which used an electric arc to oxidize nitrogen from the air. During World War I the newly industrialized Haber process (1913) was combined with the Ostwald process after 1915, allowing Germany to produce nitric acid for the war after being cut off from its supplies of mineral sodium nitrates from Chile (see nitratite).

== Modern production ==
Potassium nitrate can be made by combining ammonium nitrate and potassium hydroxide.

NH_{4}NO_{3} + KOH → NH_{3} + KNO_{3} + H_{2}O

An alternative way of producing potassium nitrate without a by-product of ammonia is to combine ammonium nitrate, found in instant ice packs, and potassium chloride, easily obtained as a sodium-free salt substitute.

NH_{4}NO_{3} + KCl → NH_{4}Cl + KNO_{3}

Potassium nitrate can also be produced by neutralizing nitric acid with potassium hydroxide. This reaction is highly exothermic.

KOH + HNO_{3} → KNO_{3} + H_{2}O

On industrial scale it is prepared by the double displacement reaction between sodium nitrate and potassium chloride.

NaNO_{3} + KCl → NaCl + KNO_{3}

== Properties ==
Potassium nitrate has an orthorhombic crystal structure at room temperature, which transforms to a trigonal system at 128 °C (262 °F). On cooling from 200 °C (392 °F), another trigonal phase forms between 124 °C (255 °F) and 100 °C (212 °F).

Sodium nitrate is isomorphous with calcite, the most stable form of calcium carbonate, whereas room-temperature potassium nitrate is isomorphous with aragonite, a slightly less stable polymorph of calcium carbonate. The difference is attributed to the similarity in size between nitrate (NO^{−}_{3}) and carbonate (CO^{2−}_{3}) ions and the fact that the potassium ion (K^{+}) is larger than sodium (Na^{+}) and calcium (Ca^{2+}) ions.

In the room-temperature structure of potassium nitrate, each potassium ion is surrounded by 6 nitrate ions. In turn, each nitrate ion is surrounded by 6 potassium ions.

Room temperature crystal structure and coordination geometry of potassium nitrate
Unit cell	Potassium coordination	Nitrate coordination

Potassium nitrate is moderately soluble in water, but its solubility increases with temperature. The aqueous solution is almost neutral, exhibiting pH 6.2 at 14 °C (57 °F) for a 10% solution of commercial powder. It is not very hygroscopic, absorbing about 0.03% water in 80% relative humidity over 50 days. It is insoluble in alcohol and is not poisonous; it can react explosively with reducing agents, but it is not explosive on its own.

=== Thermal decomposition ===
Between 550–790 °C (1,022–1,454 °F), potassium nitrate reaches a temperature-dependent equilibrium with potassium nitrite:

2 KNO_{3} ⇌ 2 KNO_{2} + O_{2}

== Uses ==
Potassium nitrate has a wide variety of uses, largely as a source of nitrate.

=== Nitric acid production ===
Historically, nitric acid was produced by combining sulfuric acid with nitrates such as saltpeter. In modern times this is reversed: nitrates are produced from nitric acid produced via the Ostwald process.

=== Oxidizer ===
A demonstration of the oxidation of a piece of charcoal in molten potassium nitrate

The most famous use of potassium nitrate is probably as the oxidizer in blackpowder. From the most ancient times until the late 1880s, blackpowder provided the explosive power for all the world's firearms. After that time, small arms and large artillery increasingly began to depend on cordite, a smokeless powder. Blackpowder remains in use today in black powder rocket motors, but potassium nitrate is also combined with other fuels like sugars in "rocket candy" (a popular amateur rocket propellant). It is also used in fireworks such as smoke bombs. It is also added to cigarettes to maintain an even burn of the tobacco and is used to ensure complete combustion of paper cartridges for cap and ball revolvers. It can also be heated to several hundred degrees to be used for niter bluing, which is less durable than other forms of protective oxidation, but allows for specific coloration of steel parts, such as screws, pins, and other small parts of firearms.

=== Meat processing ===
Potassium nitrate has been a common ingredient of salted meat since antiquity or the Middle Ages. The widespread adoption of nitrate use is more recent and is linked to the development of large-scale meat processing. The use of potassium nitrate has been mostly discontinued because it gives slow and inconsistent results compared with sodium nitrite preparations such as "Prague powder" or pink "curing salt". Even so, potassium nitrate is still used in some food applications, such as salami, dry-cured ham, charcuterie, and (in some countries) in the brine used to make corned beef (sometimes together with sodium nitrite). In the Shetland Islands (UK) it is used in the curing of mutton to make reestit mutton, a local delicacy. When used as a food additive in the European Union, the compound is referred to as E252; it is also approved for use as a food additive in the United States and Australia and New Zealand (where it is listed under its INS number 252).

==== Cancer risk ====
Since October 2015, WHO classifies processed meat as Group 1 carcinogen (based on epidemiological studies, convincingly carcinogenic to humans).

In April 2023 the French Court of Appeals of Limoges confirmed that food-watch NGO Yuka was legally legitimate in describing potassium nitrate E252 as a "cancer risk", and thus rejected an appeal by the French charcuterie industry against the organization.

=== Fertilizer ===
Potassium nitrate is used in fertilizers as a source of nitrogen and potassium – two of the macronutrients for plants. When used by itself, it has an NPK rating of 13-0-44.

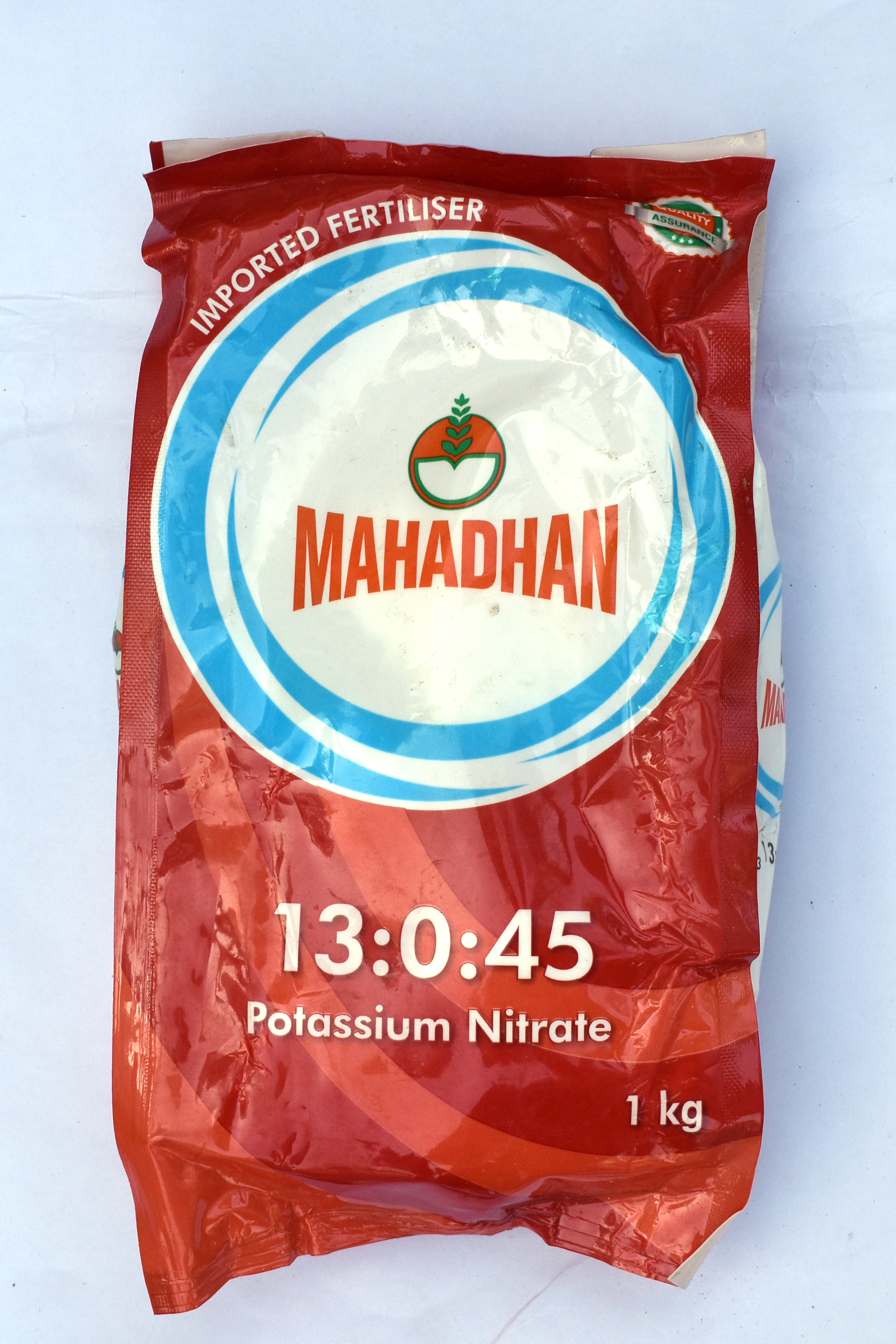
Potassium nitrate 13-0-45 KNO3 fertilizer in 1 KG commercial package

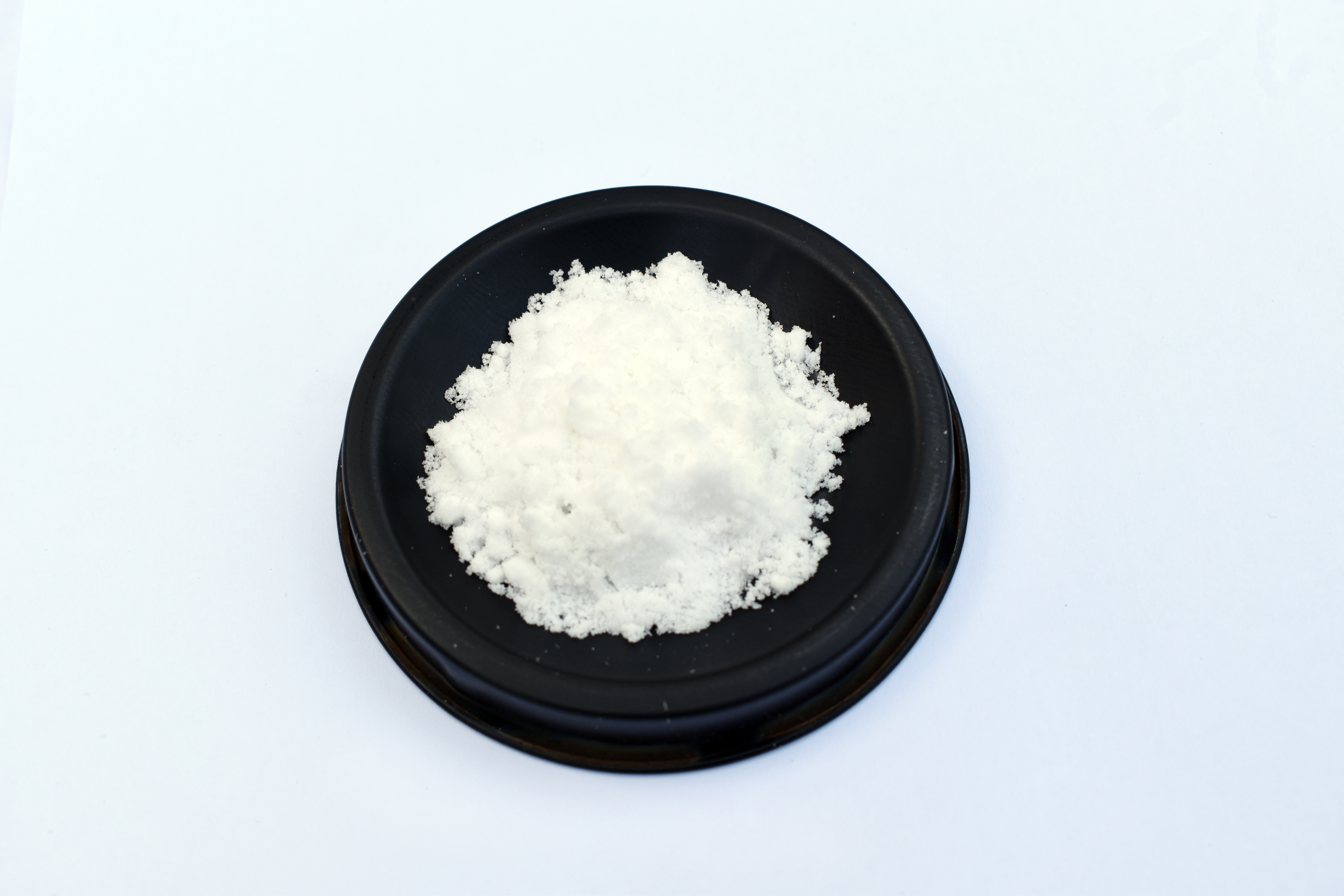
Potassium Nitrate 13-0-45 KNO3 fertilizer

=== Pharmacology ===
- Used in some toothpastes for sensitive teeth. It has been used since 1980, although the efficacy is not strongly supported by the literature.
- Used historically to treat asthma. Used in some toothpastes to relieve asthma symptoms.
- Used in Thailand as main ingredient in kidney tablets to relieve the symptoms of cystitis, pyelitis and urethritis.
- Combats high blood pressure and was once used as a hypotensive.

=== Other uses ===
- Used as an electrolyte in a salt bridge.
- Active ingredient of condensed aerosol fire suppression systems. When burned with the free radicals of a fire's flame, it produces potassium carbonate.
- Works as an aluminium cleaner.
- Component (usually about 98%) of some tree stump removal products. It accelerates the natural decomposition of the stump by supplying nitrogen for the fungi attacking the wood of the stump.
- In heat treatment of metals as a medium temperature molten salt bath, usually in combination with sodium nitrite. A similar bath is used to produce a durable blue/black finish typically seen on firearms. Its oxidizing quality, water solubility, and low cost make it an ideal short-term rust inhibitor.
- In glass toughening: molten potassium nitrate bath is used to increase glass strength and scratch-resistance.
- To induce flowering of mango trees in the Philippines.
- Thermal storage medium in power generation systems. Sodium and potassium nitrate salts are stored in a molten state with the solar energy collected by the heliostats at the Gemasolar Thermosolar Plant. Ternary salts, with the addition of calcium nitrate or lithium nitrate, have been found to improve the heat storage capacity in the molten salts.

== In folklore ==
Potassium nitrate was once thought to induce impotence, and is still rumored to be in institutional food (such as military fare). There is no scientific evidence for such properties.

In the farming lore from the Corn Belt of the 1800s, drought-killed corn in manured fields could accumulate saltpeter to the extent that upon opening the stalk for examination it would "fall as a fine powder upon the table".

== See also ==
- History of gunpowder
- Humberstone and Santa Laura Saltpeter Works
- Niter, a mineral form of potassium nitrate
- Nitratine
- Nitrocellulose
- Potassium perchlorate
