= Molten salt oxidation =

Process for destroying hazardous materials

Molten salt oxidation (MSO) is a high-temperature, flameless thermodynamic process used for the destruction of hazardous materials. Waste materials are introduced into a bath of molten salt, where organic components are oxidized to simple gases such as carbon dioxide and water. A key operational limitation is the gradual accumulation of inorganic contaminants in the molten salt, which necessitates periodic regeneration or replacement of the melt.

The molten salt of choice has been sodium carbonate (m.p 851°C), but other salts can be used. Sulfur, halogens, phosphorus and similar volatile pollutants are oxidized and retained in the melt. Most organic carbon content leaves as relatively pure CO/CO_{2}/H_{2}/H_{2}O gas (depending on the feed conditions, whether steam or air is used), and the effluent only requires a cold trap and a mild aqueous wash (except mercury-containing wastes). It has been used for safe biological and chemical weapons destruction, and processing waste such as scrap tires where direct incineration/effluent treatment is difficult.

== See also ==
- Recovery boiler – a technology with similar issues used in Kraft process chemical pulping of paper, though temperatures <500°C
