= Lithium nitrite =

Names
- Preferred IUPAC name Lithium nitrite

Identifiers
CAS Number	13568-33-7
3D model (JSmol)	Interactive image
ChemSpider	145980
ECHA InfoCard	100.033.600
EC Number	236-976-1
PubChem CID	166849
CompTox Dashboard (EPA)	DTXSID90884518
- InChI: InChI=1S/Li.HNO2/c;2-1-3/h;(H,2,3)/q+1;/p-1 Key: IDNHOWMYUQKKTI-UHFFFAOYSA-M; InChI=1/Li.HNO2/c;2-1-3/h;(H,2,3)/q+1;/p-1 Key: IDNHOWMYUQKKTI-REWHXWOFAV
- SMILES: [Li+].N(=O)[O-]

Properties
Chemical formula	LiNO_{2}
Molar mass	52.9465 g/mol
Appearance	white, hygroscopic crystals
Melting point	222 °C (432 °F; 495 K)
Solubility in water	49 wt.% (20 °C)

Thermochemistry
Std molar entropy (S^{⦵}_{298})	96.0 J/mol K
Std enthalpy of formation (Δ_{f}H^{⦵}_{298})	−372.4 kJ/mol
Gibbs free energy (Δ_{f}G^{⦵})	−302.0 kJ/mol
Enthalpy of fusion (Δ_{f}H^{⦵}_{fus})	9.2 kJ/mol
- Except where otherwise noted, data are given for materials in their standard state (at 25 °C [77 °F], 100 kPa). Infobox references

Lithium nitrite is the lithium salt of nitrous acid, with formula LiNO_{2}. This compound is hygroscopic and very soluble in water. It is used as a corrosion inhibitor in mortar. It is also used in the production of explosives, due to its ability to nitrosate ketones under certain conditions.

== Preparation ==
Lithium nitrate (LiNO_{3}) will undergo thermal decomposition above 500 °C to yield the evolution of lithium nitrite and oxygen as in the following reaction:

2 LiNO_{3} → 2 LiNO_{2} + O_{2} (at ~500 °C)

Lithium nitrite can also be prepared by the reaction of nitric oxide (NO) with lithium hydroxide (LiOH) as shown below:

4 NO + 2 LiOH → 2 LiNO_{2} + N_{2}O + H_{2}O

6 NO + 4 LiOH → 4 LiNO_{2} + N_{2} + 2 H_{2}O

== Crystallization and crystal structure ==
Lithium nitrite crystals can be obtained most efficiently by reacting lithium sulfate and barium nitrite in an aqueous solution. However, these crystals can also be prepared by mixing equal amounts of lithium sulfate and potassium nitrite in highly concentrated aqueous solution. This is followed by considerable evaporation and filtration, which removes the resulting precipitate of potassium sulfate and lithium potassium sulfate after further evaporation and extraction with absolute alcohol.

Lithium nitrite is exceptionally soluble in absolute alcohol. However, potassium nitrite is not very soluble. This makes absolute alcohol a choice solvent for the crystallization of lithium nitrite because the crystals can be extracted in a substantially pure state. The alcoholic solution will leave a white residue of small crystals upon evaporation. The addition of a small amount of water to this residue will yield the larger needle-shaped crystals of lithium nitrite monohydrate (LiNO_{2}·H_{2}O).

The above methods will result in flat, needle-shaped crystals. These crystals are white and typically 1–2 cm. in length. Below 100 °C, these crystals will melt in their own water of crystallization and will tend to lose water slowly. Rapid dehydration will occur at temperatures above 160 °C as well as a minuscule loss of nitrogen oxide. This rapid dehydration leaves behind a residue which consists almost entirely of the anhydrous salt. This anhydrous salt is extraordinarily soluble in water and will readily form a supersaturated solution. Monohydrate crystals will deposit from this supersaturated solution upon cooling or with the addition of ready formed salt crystals.

== Industrial uses ==
Reinforcement bars, ready mixed concrete materials, and repair materials are often subject to corrosion. These resources will rapidly degrade due to chloride attack and carbonatation. This not only affects the service lives of such materials, but it also requires a considerable cost for the repair of such defects. Lithium nitrite and calcium nitrite are generally used in the construction industry as a means to protect reinforced concrete structures from corrosion. Unlike calcium nitrite inhibitors, lithium nitrite is particularly valued for corrosion inhibition and resistance of carbonation when an accelerated hardening process is not used and when a high concentration of 10% or more cement is added by weight.

Generally speaking, studying the effectiveness of such inhibitors has been done using destructive methods. These studies require placing specimens to accelerated corrosion and measuring the degree of corrosion. "However, it is extremely difficult to measure the effect of corrosion inhibitors in actual structures using a destructive method."

Recently, sensors that can measure changes in electrical resistance due to the corrosion in iron and thus indicate the degree of corrosion of a material have been developed. These sensors provide a non-destructive way to evaluate the degree of corrosion in concrete materials. Therefore, the effect of lithium nitrite as a corrosion inhibitor has also been studied by non-destructive means.

A study was conducted in Korea to experimentally determine the most effective dose and performance of lithium nitrite corrosion inhibitors. This experiment employed the molar ratio of nitrite ions to chloride ions (NO_{2}^{−}/Cl^{−}) as a test parameter. This study concluded that a lithium nitrite dosage of 0.6 in the nitrite-chloride ion molar ratio is a successful dosage for mortar containing chlorides.

== Cited sources ==
- Haynes, William M., ed. (2016). CRC Handbook of Chemistry and Physics (97th ed.). CRC Press. ISBN 9781498754293.
