= Alkali metal nitrate =

Class of chemical compounds

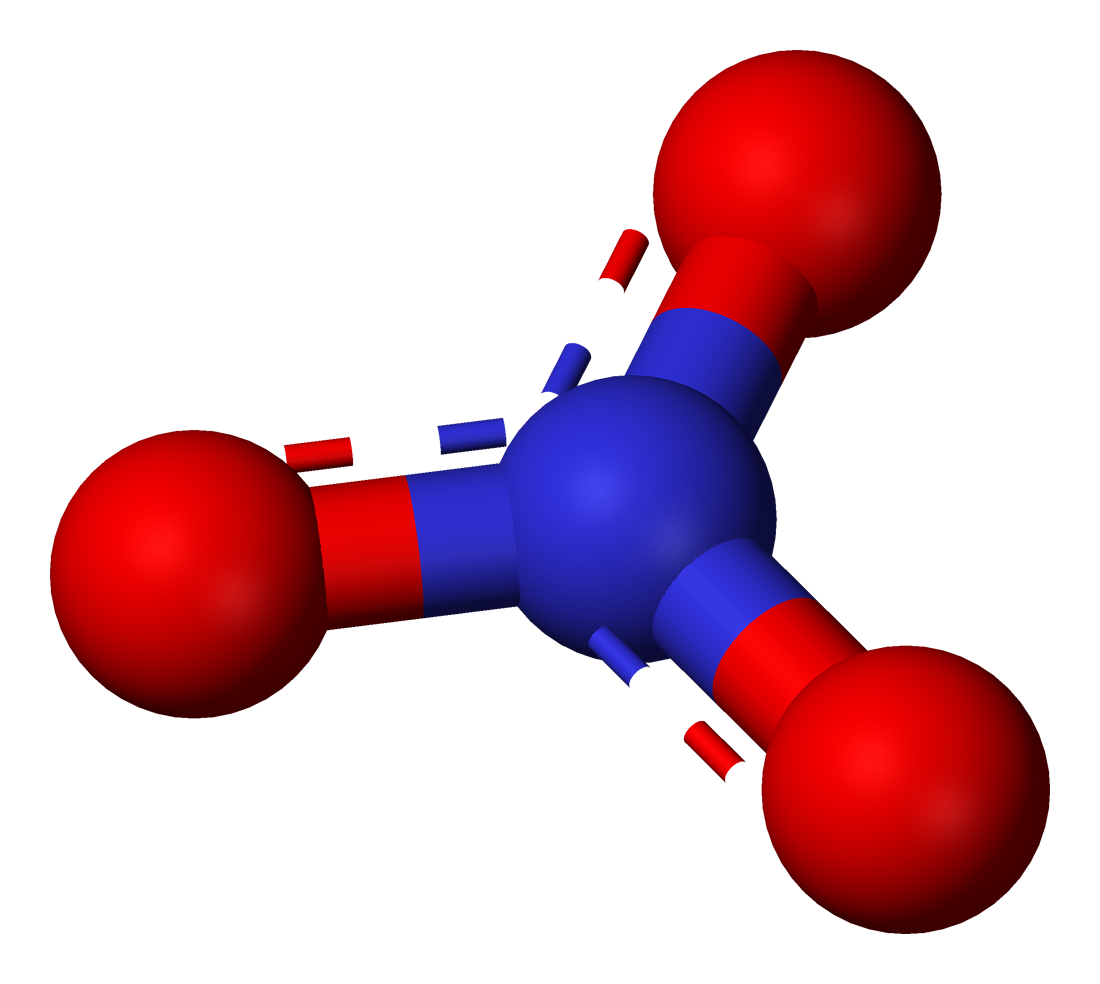
The nitrate ion

Alkali metal nitrates are chemical compounds consisting of an alkali metal (lithium, sodium, potassium, rubidium and caesium) and the nitrate ion. Only two are of major commercial value, the sodium and potassium salts. They are white, water-soluble salts with melting points ranging from 255 °C (LiNO_{3}) to 414 °C (CsNO_{3}) on a relatively narrow span of 159 °C

Compound	Chemical Formula	Molar Mass	Melting Point	Decomposition Point (°C)	Structure
Lithium nitrate	LiNO_{3}	68.946 g/mol	255 °C (491 °F; 528 K)	474	
Sodium nitrate	NaNO_{3}	84.9947 g/mol	308 °C (586 °F; 581° K )	525	
Potassium nitrate	KNO_{3}	101.1032 g/mol	334 °C (633 °F; 607 K)	533	
Rubidium nitrate	RbNO_{3}	147.473 g/mol	310 °C (590 °F; 583 K)	548	
Caesium nitrate	CsNO_{3}	194.91 g/mol	414 °C (777 °F; 687 K)	584	

The melting point of the alkali metal nitrates tends to increase from 255 °C to 414 °C (with an anomaly for rubidium being not properly aligned in the series) as the atomic mass and the ionic radius (naked cation) of the alkaline metal increases, going down in the column. Similarly, but not presented here in the table, the solubility of these salts in water also decreases with the atomic mass of the metal.

== Applications ==
Sodium and potassium nitrates are commonly used as fertilizers. As they are also strong oxidizers, they enter pyrotechnic compositions and the manufacturing of explosives.

Eutectic mixtures of alkali metal nitrates are used as molten salts. For example, a 40:7:53 mixture of NaNO_{2}: NaNO_{3}:KNO_{3} melts at 142 °C and is stable to about 600 °C.

A minor use is for coloring the light emitted by fireworks:

- lithium nitrate produces a red color,
- sodium nitrate produces a yellow/orange color,
- potassium nitrate and rubidium nitrate produce violet colors,
- caesium nitrate produces an indigo color.

In a general way, the emitted color progressively turns from the red to the violet in the visible spectrum of light when going down in the column of the alkaline metals in the periodic table of Mendeleev. It corresponds to a decrease of the wavelength of the light emitted during the electrons de-excitation step in the atoms brought at high temperature. The photons emitted by caesium are more energetic than these of lithium.

== See also ==
- Alkali metal hydride
- Alkali metal halide
- Ammonium nitrate
- Nitric acid
