= Caesium nitrate =

Chemical compound CsNO_{3}

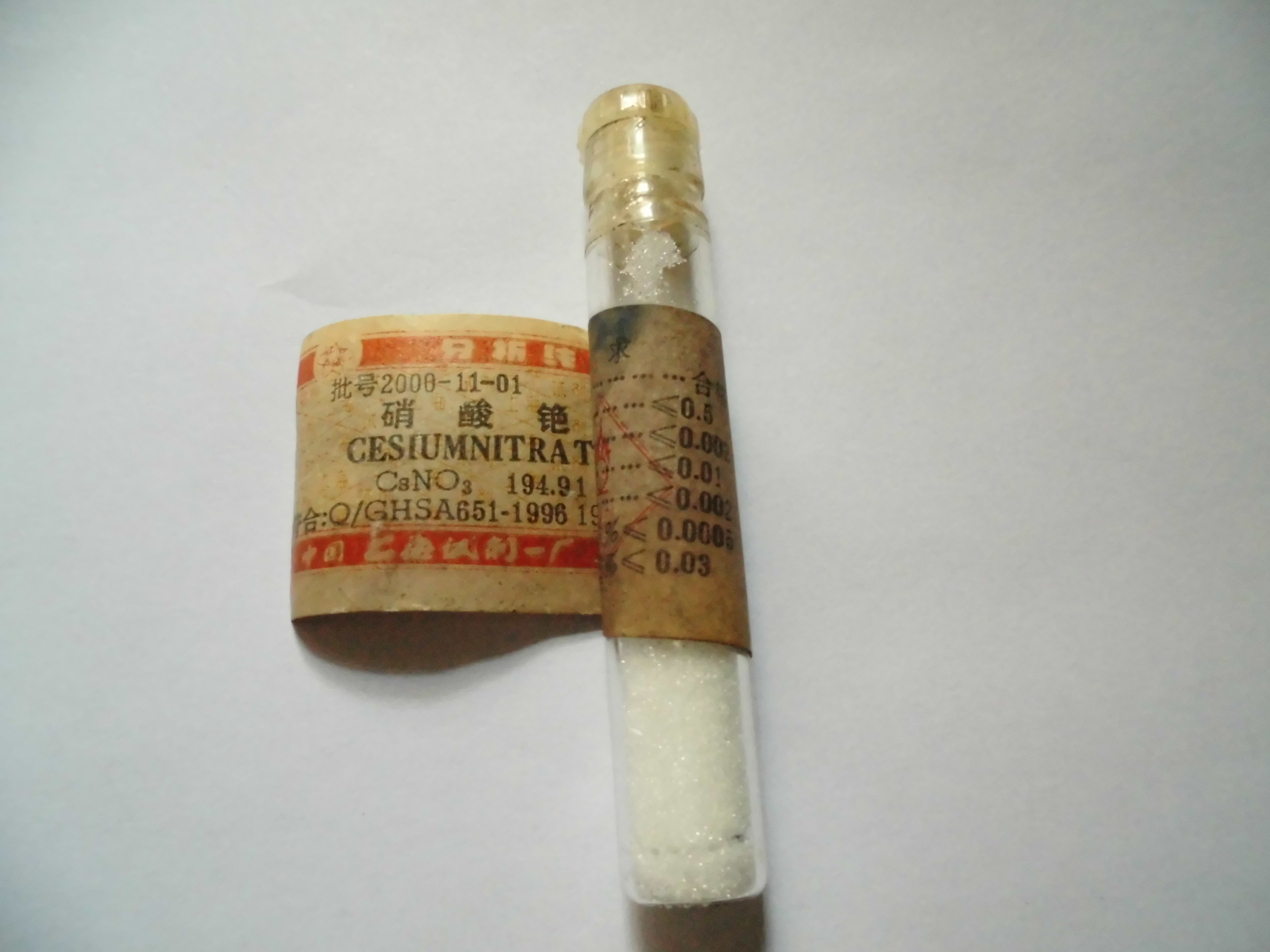

Identifiers
CAS Number	7789-18-6
3D model (JSmol)	Interactive image
ChEBI	CHEBI:231514
ChemSpider	56425
ECHA InfoCard	100.029.224
EC Number	232-146-8
PubChem CID	62674
RTECS number	FL0700000
UNII	0K0743KO17
UN number	1451
CompTox Dashboard (EPA)	DTXSID2064860
- InChI: InChI=1S/Cs.NO3/c;2-1(3)4/q+1;-1 Key: NLSCHDZTHVNDCP-UHFFFAOYSA-N; InChI=1/Cs.NO3/c;2-1(3)4/q+1;-1 Key: NLSCHDZTHVNDCP-UHFFFAOYAE
- SMILES: [Cs+].[O-][N+]([O-])=O

Properties
Chemical formula	CsNO_{3}
Molar mass	194.91 g/mol
Appearance	white solid
Density	3.685 g/cm^{3}
Melting point	414 °C (777 °F; 687 K)
Boiling point	decomposes, see text
Solubility in water	9.16 g/100 ml (0 °C); 196.8 g/100 ml (100 °C)
Solubility in acetone	soluble
Solubility in ethanol	slightly soluble

Hazards
- GHS labelling
Pictograms	
Signal word	Warning
Hazard statements	H272, H315, H319, H335
Precautionary statements	P210, P220, P221, P280, P370+P378, P501
Flash point	Non-flammable
- Lethal dose or concentration (LD, LC)
LD_{50} (median dose)	2390 mg/kg (oral, rat)

Related compounds
Other anions	Caesium nitrite
Other cations	Lithium nitrate Sodium nitrate Potassium nitrate Rubidium nitrate
- Except where otherwise noted, data are given for materials in their standard state (at 25 °C [77 °F], 100 kPa). verify (what is ?) Infobox references

Caesium nitrate or cesium nitrate is a salt with the chemical formula CsNO_{3}. An alkali metal nitrate, it is used in pyrotechnic compositions, as a colorant and an oxidizer, e.g. in decoys and illumination flares. The caesium emissions are chiefly due to two powerful spectral lines at 852.113 nm and 894.347 nm.

Caesium nitrate prisms are used in infrared spectroscopy, in x-ray phosphors, and in scintillation counters. It is also used in making optical glasses and lenses.

As with other alkali metal nitrates, caesium nitrate decomposes on gentle heating to give caesium nitrite:

2 CsNO_{3} → 2 CsNO_{2} + O_{2}

Caesium also forms two unusual acid nitrates, which can be described as CsNO_{3}·HNO_{3} and CsNO_{3}·2HNO_{3} (melting points 100 °C and 36–38 °C respectively).
