= Potassium nitrite =

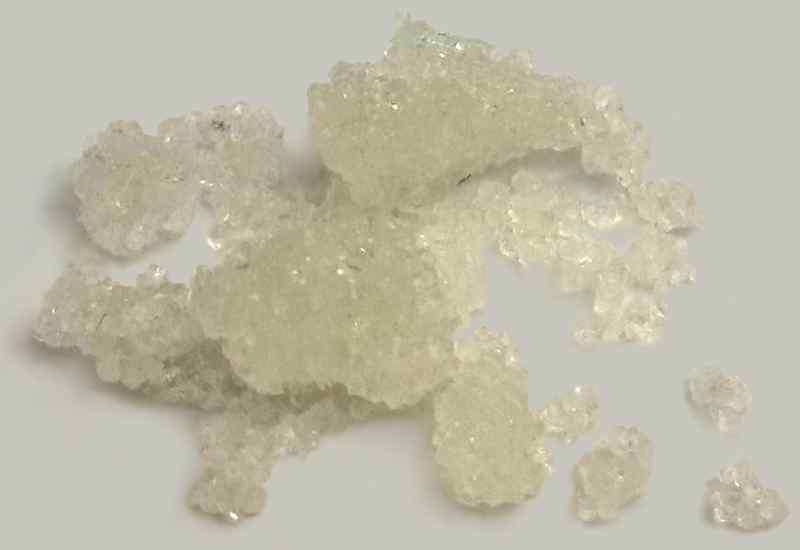

Identifiers
CAS Number	7758-09-0
3D model (JSmol)	Interactive image
ChEMBL	ChEMBL3186418
ChemSpider	22857
ECHA InfoCard	100.028.939
EC Number	231-832-4
E number	E249 (preservatives)
PubChem CID	516910
RTECS number	TT3750000
UNII	794654G42L
UN number	1488
CompTox Dashboard (EPA)	DTXSID5042320
- InChI: InChI=1S/K.HNO2/c;2-1-3/h;(H,2,3)/q+1;/p-1 Key: BXNHTSHTPBPRFX-UHFFFAOYSA-M; InChI=1/K.HNO2/c;2-1-3/h;(H,2,3)/q+1;/p-1 Key: BXNHTSHTPBPRFX-REWHXWOFAI
- SMILES: [K+].[O-]N=O

Properties
Chemical formula	KNO_{2}
Molar mass	85.10379 g/mol
Appearance	white or slight yellow solid deliquescent
Density	1.914986 g/cm^{3}
Melting point	440.02 °C (824.04 °F; 713.17 K) (decomposes)
Boiling point	537 °C (999 °F; 810 K) (explodes)
Solubility in water	281 g/100 mL (0 °C); 312 g/100 mL (25 °C); 413 g/100 mL (100 °C)
Solubility	soluble in alcohol, ammonia
Magnetic susceptibility (χ)	−23.3·10^{−6} cm^{3}/mol

Thermochemistry
Heat capacity (C)	107.4 J/mol K
Std enthalpy of formation (Δ_{f}H^{⦵}_{298})	−369.8 kJ/mol

Hazards
- GHS labelling
Pictograms	(GHS03: Oxidizing) (GHS06: Toxic) (GHS09: Environmental hazard)
Signal word	Danger
Hazard statements	H272, H301, H400
Precautionary statements	P210, P220, P221, P264, P270, P273, P280, P301+P310, P321, P330, P370+P378, P391, P405, P501
NFPA 704 (fire diamond)	3 0 2 OX
Flash point	Non-flammable
- Lethal dose or concentration (LD, LC)
LD_{50} (median dose)	235 mg/kg
Safety data sheet (SDS)	External MSDS

Related compounds
Other anions	Potassium nitrate
Other cations	Sodium nitrite
- Except where otherwise noted, data are given for materials in their standard state (at 25 °C [77 °F], 100 kPa). verify (what is ?) Infobox references

Potassium nitrite (distinct from potassium nitrate) is the inorganic compound with the chemical formula KNO_{2}. It is an ionic salt of potassium ions K^{+} and nitrite ions NO_{2}^{−}, which forms a white or slightly yellow, hygroscopic crystalline powder that is soluble in water.

It is a strong oxidizer and may accelerate the combustion of other materials. Like other nitrite salts such as sodium nitrite, potassium nitrite is toxic if swallowed, and laboratory tests suggest that it may be mutagenic or teratogenic. Gloves and safety glasses are usually used when handling potassium nitrite.

== Discovery ==
Nitrite is present at trace levels in soil, natural waters, plant and animal tissues, and fertilizer. The pure form of nitrite was first made by the Swedish chemist Carl Wilhelm Scheele working in the laboratory of his pharmacy in the market town of Köping. He heated potassium nitrate at red heat for half an hour and obtained what he recognized as a new “salt.” The two compounds (potassium nitrate and nitrite) were characterized by Péligot and the reaction was established as:

2 KNO_{3} → 2 KNO_{2} + O_{2}

== Production ==
Potassium nitrite can be obtained by the reduction of potassium nitrate. The production of potassium nitrite by absorption of nitrogen oxides in potassium hydroxide or potassium carbonate is not employed on a large scale because of the high price of these alkalies. Furthermore, the fact that potassium nitrite is highly soluble in water makes the solid difficult to recover.

== Reactions ==
The mixing of cyanamide and KNO_{2} produces changes from white solids to yellow liquid and then to orange solid, forming cyanogen and ammonia gases. No external energy is used and the reactions are carried out with a small amount of O_{2}.

Potassium nitrite forms potassium nitrate when heated in the presence of oxygen from 550 °C to 790 °C. The rate of reaction increases with temperature, but the extent of reaction decreases. At 550 °C and 600 °C the reaction is continuous and eventually goes to completion. From 650 °C to 750 °C, as the case of decomposition of potassium nitrate is, the system attains equilibrium. At 790 °C, a rapid decrease in volume is first observed, followed by a period of 15 minutes during which no volume changes occur. This is then followed by an increase in volume due primarily to the evolution of nitrogen, which is attributed to the decomposition of potassium nitrite.

Potassium nitrite reacts at an extremely slow rate with a liquid ammonia solution of potassium amide at room temperatures, and in the presence of ferric oxide or cobaltic oxide, to form nitrogen and potassium hydroxide.

== Medical uses ==
Interest in a medical role for inorganic nitrite was first aroused because of the spectacular success of organic nitrites and related compounds in the treatment of angina pectoris. While working with Butter at the Edinburgh Royal Infirmary in the 1860s, Brunton noted that the pain of angina could be lessened by venesection and wrongly concluded that the pain must be due to elevated blood pressure. As a treatment for angina, the reduction of circulating blood by venesection was inconvenient. Therefore, he decided to try the effect on a patient of inhaling amyl nitrite, a recently synthesized compound and one that his colleague had shown lowered blood pressure in animals. Pain associated with an anginal attack disappeared rapidly, and the effect lasted for several minutes, generally long enough for the patient to recover by resting. For a time, amyl nitrite was the favored treatment for angina, but due to its volatility, it was replaced by chemically related compounds that had the same effect.

The effect of potassium nitrite on the nervous system, brain, spinal cord, pulse, arterial blood pressure, and respiration of healthy human volunteers was noted, as was the variability between individuals. The most significant observation was that even a small dose of <0.5 grains (≈30 mg) given by mouth caused, at first, an increase in arterial blood pressure, followed by a moderate decrease. With larger doses, pronounced hypotension ensued. They also noted that potassium nitrite, however administered, had a profound effect on the appearance and oxygen-carrying capacity of the blood. They compared the biological action of potassium nitrite with that of amyl and ethyl nitrites and concluded that the similarity of action depends on the conversion of organic nitrites to nitrous acid.

Solutions of acidified nitrite have been used successfully to generate NO and to induce vasorelaxation in isolated blood vessel studies, and the same reaction mechanism has been proposed to explain the biological action of nitrite.

== Other uses ==
Potassium nitrite is used in the manufacturing of heat transfer salts. As a food additive with the E number E249, potassium nitrite is used as a preservative similar to sodium nitrite and is approved for usage in the EU, USA, Australia, and New Zealand (where it is listed under its INS number 249).

Potassium nitrite is also used by modern luthiers to darken the tone and possibly improve the acoustic characteristics of violins, used after completing the box and before varnishing. The KNO_{2} is applied then exposed to sunlight.

== Reactivity hazards ==
When reacting with acids, potassium nitrite forms toxic nitrous oxides. Fusion with ammonium salts results in effervescence and ignition. Reactions with reducing agents can result in fires and explosions.

== Storage requirements ==
Potassium nitrite is stored with other oxidizing agents but separated from flammables, combustibles, reducing agents, acids, cyanides, ammonium compounds, amides, and other nitrogenous salts in a cool, dry, well ventilated location.

== See also ==
- Sodium nitrite
- Potassium nitrate
- Nitrite
