= Sodium nitrate =

Chemical compound

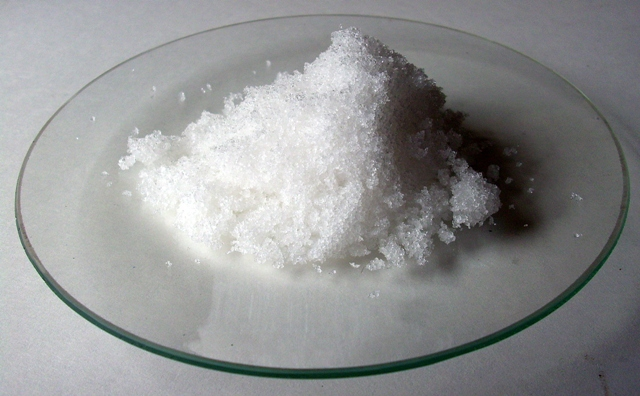

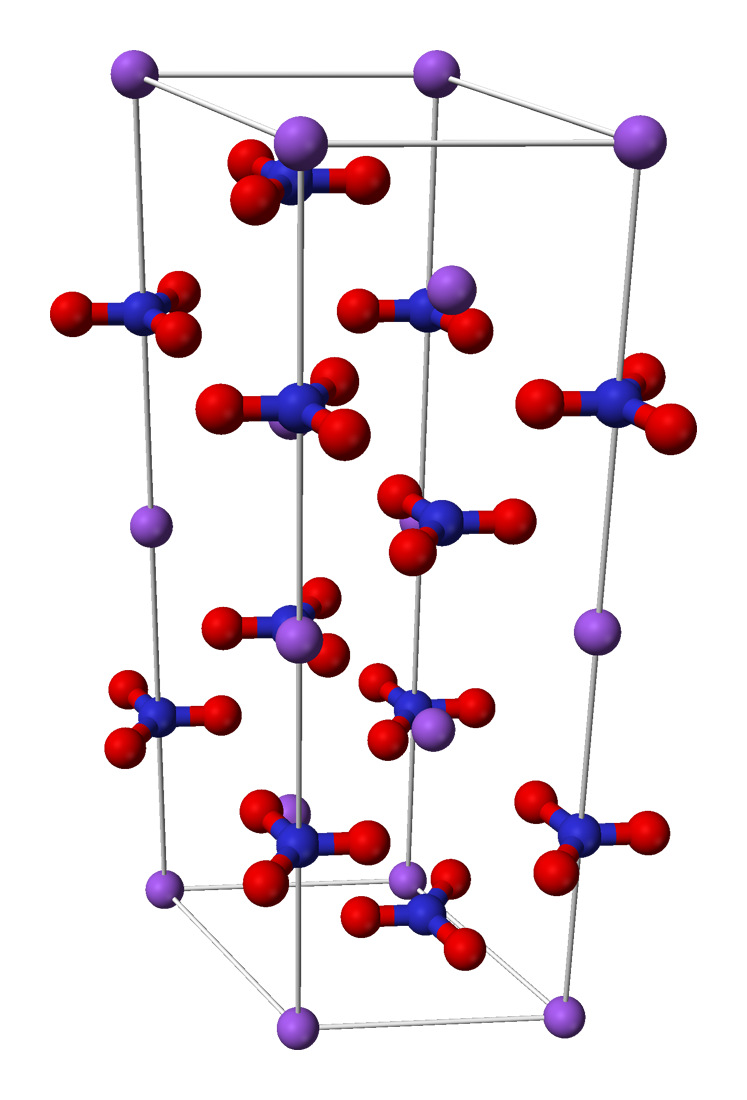

Names
- IUPAC name Sodium nitrate
- Other names Peru saltpeter Soda niter cubic niter

Identifiers
CAS Number	7631-99-4
3D model (JSmol)	Interactive image
ChEMBL	ChEMBL1644698
ChemSpider	22688
ECHA InfoCard	100.028.686
EC Number	231-554-3
E number	E251 (preservatives)
PubChem CID	24268
RTECS number	WC5600000
UNII	8M4L3H2ZVZ
UN number	1498
CompTox Dashboard (EPA)	DTXSID6020937
- InChI: InChI=1S/NO3.Na/c2-1(3)4;/q-1;+1 Key: VWDWKYIASSYTQR-UHFFFAOYSA-N; InChI=1/NO3.Na/c2-1(3)4;/q-1;+1 Key: VWDWKYIASSYTQR-UHFFFAOYAL
- SMILES: [Na+].[O-] [N+]([O-])=O

Properties
Chemical formula	NaNO_{3}
Molar mass	84.9947 g/mol
Appearance	White powder or colorless crystals
Odor	sweet
Density	2.257 g/cm^{3}, solid
Melting point	308 °C (586 °F; 581 K)
Boiling point	380 °C (716 °F; 653 K) decomposes
Solubility in water	73 g/100 g water (0 °C); 91.2 g/100 g water (25 °C); 180 g/100 g water (100 °C)
Solubility	very soluble in ammonia, hydrazine soluble in alcohol slightly soluble in pyridine insoluble in acetone
Magnetic susceptibility (χ)	−25.6·10^{−6} cm^{3}/mol
Refractive index (n_{D})	1.587 (trigonal); 1.336 (rhombohedral)
Viscosity	2.85 cP (317 °C)

Structure
Crystal structure	trigonal and rhombohedral

Thermochemistry
Heat capacity (C)	93.05 J/(mol K)
Std molar entropy (S^{⦵}_{298})	116 J/(mol K)
Std enthalpy of formation (Δ_{f}H^{⦵}_{298})	−467 kJ/mol
Gibbs free energy (Δ_{f}G^{⦵})	−365.9 kJ/mol

Hazards
- Occupational safety and health (OHS/OSH)
Main hazards	Harmful (Xn); Oxidant (O)
- GHS labelling
Pictograms	(GHS07: Exclamation mark) (GHS03: Oxidizing)
NFPA 704 (fire diamond)	1 0 0 OX
Flash point	Non-flammable
- Lethal dose or concentration (LD, LC)
LD_{50} (median dose)	3236 mg/kg
Safety data sheet (SDS)	ICSC 0185

Related compounds
Other anions	Sodium nitrite
Other cations	Lithium nitrate Potassium nitrate Rubidium nitrate Caesium nitrate
Related compounds	Sodium sulfate Sodium chloride
- Except where otherwise noted, data are given for materials in their standard state (at 25 °C [77 °F], 100 kPa). verify (what is ?) Infobox references

Sodium nitrate is the chemical compound with the formula NaNO_{3}. This alkali metal nitrate salt is also known as Chile saltpeter (large deposits of which were historically mined in Chile) to distinguish it from ordinary saltpeter, potassium nitrate. The mineral form is also known as nitratine, nitratite or soda niter.

Sodium nitrate is a white deliquescent solid very soluble in water. It is a readily available source of the nitrate anion (NO_{3}^{−}), which is useful in several reactions carried out on industrial scales for the production of fertilizers, pyrotechnics, smoke bombs and other explosives, glass and pottery enamels, food preservatives (esp. meats), and solid rocket propellant. It has been mined extensively for these purposes.

== History ==
An early scientific account of the South American deposits was published in 1821 by the Peruvian mineralogist Mariano Eduardo de Rivero y Ustáriz, who analyzed a sample from the Tarapacá district, then part of Peru. The specimen had been supplied by Pedro Fuentes and was held in the Paris laboratory of the mineralogist René Just Haüy. Rivero concluded that the mineral could be used for industrial purposes like glassmaking, fertilizer, and gunpowder, although commercial work did not begin until 1831.

The first shipment of saltpeter to Europe arrived in England from Peru in 1820 or 1825, right after that country's independence from Spain, but did not find any buyers and was dumped at sea to avoid customs tolls. With time, however, the mining of South American saltpeter became a profitable business (in 1859, England alone consumed 47,000 metric tons). Chile fought the War of the Pacific (1879–1884) against the allies Peru and Bolivia and took over their richest deposits of saltpeter. In 1919, Ralph Walter Graystone Wyckoff determined its crystal structure using X-ray crystallography.

== Occurrence ==
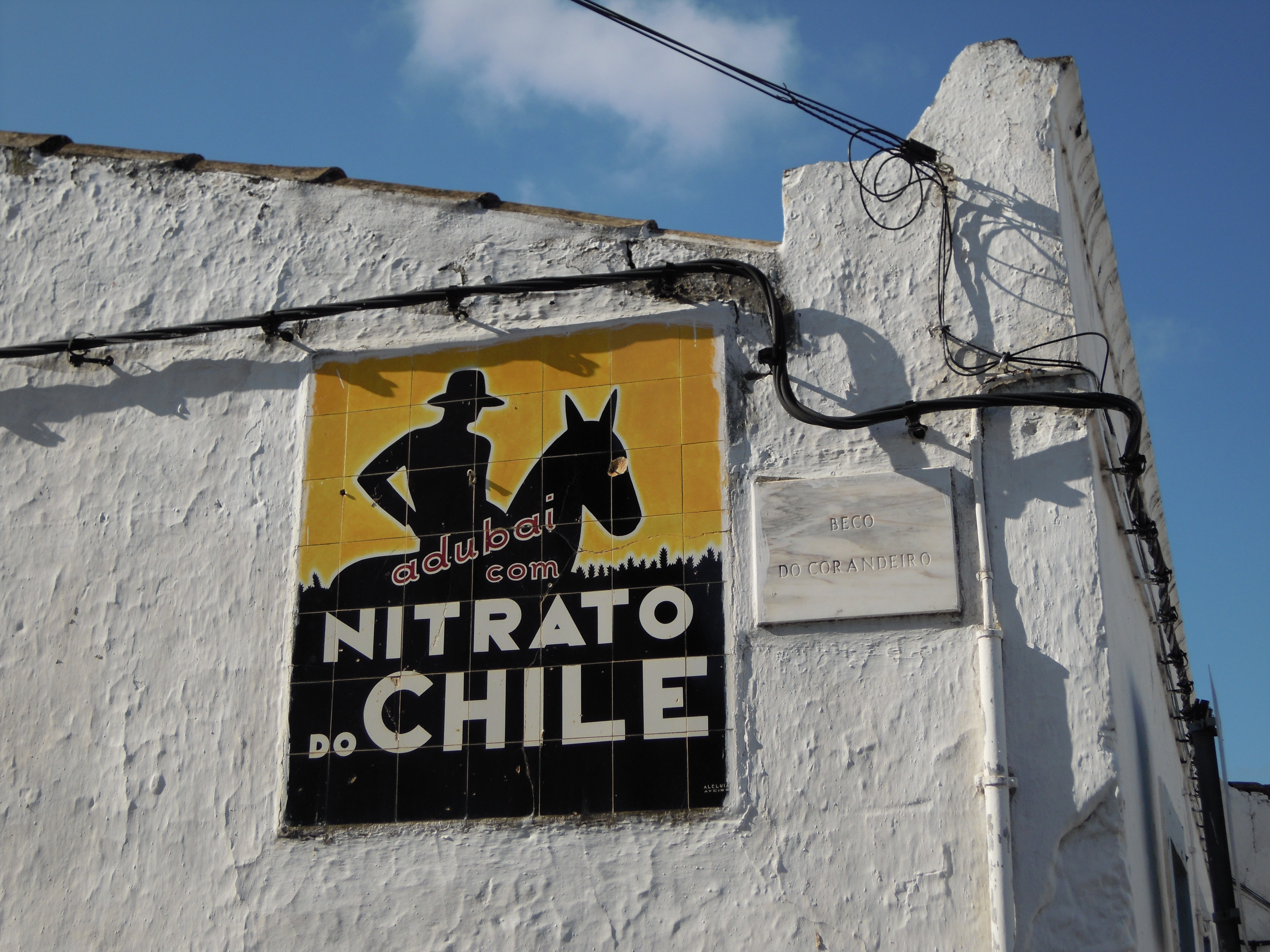
Advertisement for sodium nitrate fertilizer from Chile on a wall of a village in the Algarve area of Portugal

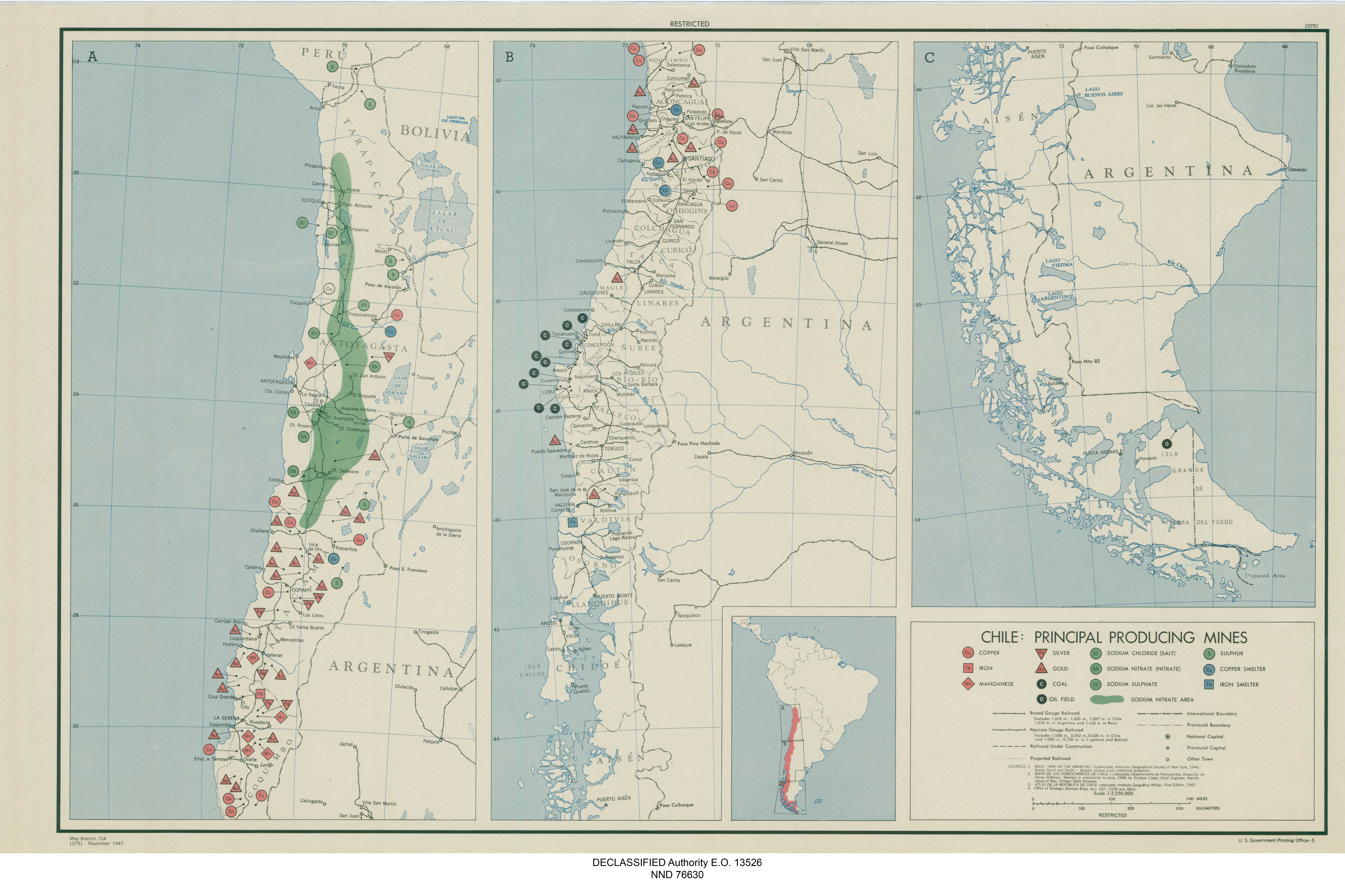
Mines of Chile, green is sodium nitrate area

The largest accumulations of naturally occurring sodium nitrate are found in Chile and Peru, where nitrate salts are bound within mineral deposits called caliche ore. Nitrates accumulate on land through marine-fog precipitation and sea-spray oxidation/desiccation followed by gravitational settling of airborne NaNO_{3}, KNO_{3}, NaCl, Na_{2}SO_{4}, and I, in the hot-dry desert atmosphere. El Niño/La Niña extreme aridity/torrential rain cycles favor nitrates accumulation through both aridity and water solution/remobilization/transportation onto slopes and into basins; capillary solution movement forms layers of nitrates; pure nitrate forms rare veins. For more than a century, the world supply of the compound was mined almost exclusively from the Atacama desert in northern Chile until, at the turn of the 20th century, German chemists Fritz Haber and Carl Bosch developed a process for producing ammonia from the atmosphere on an industrial scale (see Haber process). With the onset of World War I, Germany began converting ammonia from this process into a synthetic Chilean saltpeter, which was as practical as the natural compound in production of gunpowder and other munitions. By the 1940s, this conversion process resulted in a dramatic decline in demand for sodium nitrate procured from natural sources.

Chile still has the largest reserves of caliche, with active mines in such locations as Valdivia, María Elena and Pampa Blanca, and there it used to be called white gold. Sodium nitrate, potassium nitrate, sodium sulfate and iodine are all obtained by the processing of caliche. The former Chilean saltpeter mining communities of Humberstone and Santa Laura were declared UNESCO World Heritage sites in 2005.

== Synthesis ==
Sodium nitrate is also synthesized industrially by neutralizing nitric acid with sodium carbonate or sodium bicarbonate:

2 HNO_{3} + Na_{2}CO_{3} → 2 NaNO_{3} + H_{2}O + CO_{2}

HNO_{3} + NaHCO_{3} → NaNO_{3} + H_{2}O + CO_{2}

or also by neutralizing it with sodium hydroxide (however, this reaction is very exothermic):

HNO_{3} + NaOH → NaNO_{3} + H_{2}O

or by mixing stoichiometric amounts of ammonium nitrate and sodium hydroxide, sodium bicarbonate or sodium carbonate:

NH_{4}NO_{3} + NaOH → NaNO_{3} + NH_{4}OH

NH_{4}NO_{3} + NaHCO_{3} → NaNO_{3} + NH_{4}HCO_{3}

2NH_{4}NO_{3} + Na_{2}CO_{3} → 2NaNO_{3} + (NH_{4})_{2}CO_{3}

== Uses ==
Most sodium nitrate is used in fertilizers, where it supplies a water-soluble form of nitrogen. Its use, which is mainly outside of high-income countries, is attractive since it does not alter the pH of the soil. Another major use is as a complement to ammonium nitrate in explosives. Molten sodium nitrate and its solutions with potassium nitrate have good thermal stability (up to 600 °C) and high heat capacities. These properties are suitable for thermally annealing metals and for storing thermal energy in solar applications.

=== Food ===
Sodium nitrate is also a food additive used as a preservative and color fixative in cured meats and poultry; it is listed under its INS number 251 or E number E251. It is approved for use in the EU, US and Australia and New Zealand. Sodium nitrate should not be confused with sodium nitrite, which is also a common food additive and preservative used, for example, in deli meats.

=== Thermal storage ===
Sodium nitrate has also been investigated as a phase-change material for thermal energy recovery, owing to its relatively high melting enthalpy of 178 J/g. Examples of the applications of sodium nitrate used for thermal energy storage include solar thermal power technologies and direct steam generating parabolic troughs.

=== Steel coating ===
Sodium nitrate is used in a steel coating process in which it forms a surface of magnetite layer.

== Health concerns ==
Studies have shown a link between increased levels of nitrates and increased deaths from certain diseases including Alzheimer's disease, diabetes mellitus, stomach cancer, and Parkinson's disease: possibly through the damaging effect of nitrosamines on DNA; however, little has been done to control for other possible causes in the epidemiological results. Nitrosamines, formed in cured meats containing sodium nitrate and nitrite, have been linked to gastric cancer and esophageal cancer. Sodium nitrate and nitrite are associated with a higher risk of colorectal cancer.

Nitrates are key intermediates and effectors in the primary vasculature signaling which is necessary for all mammals to survive.

== See also ==
- Sodium nitrite
