= Lithium nitrate =

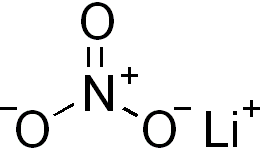

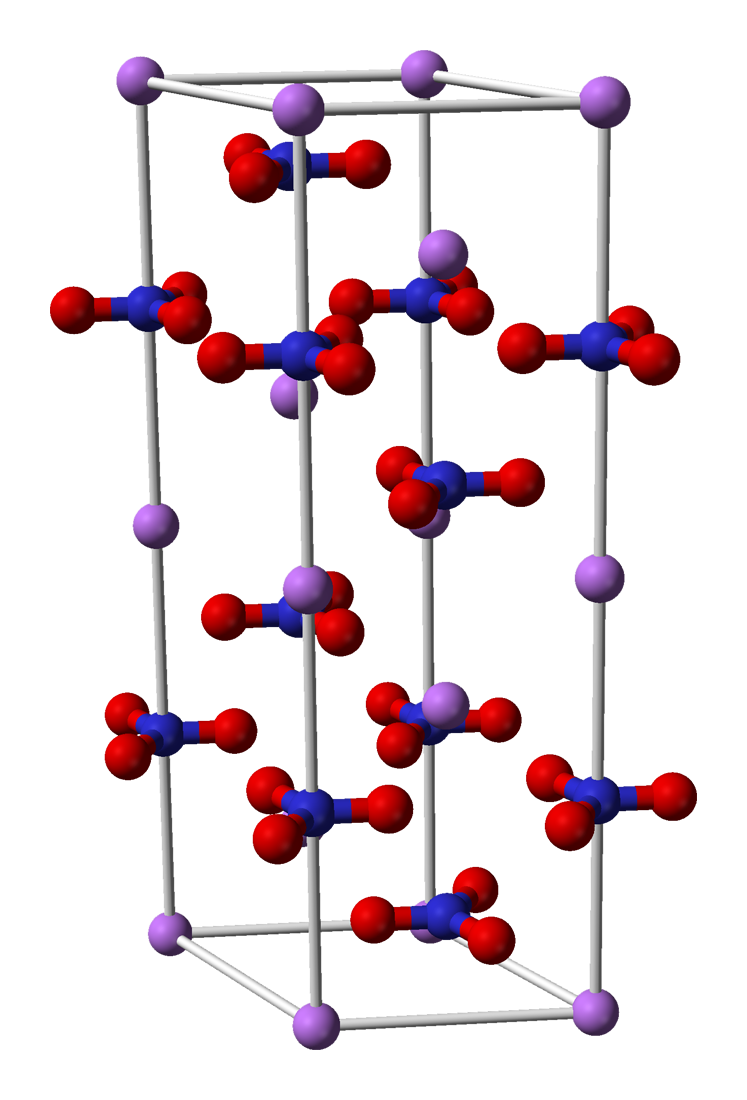
- __ Li^{+} __ N __ O

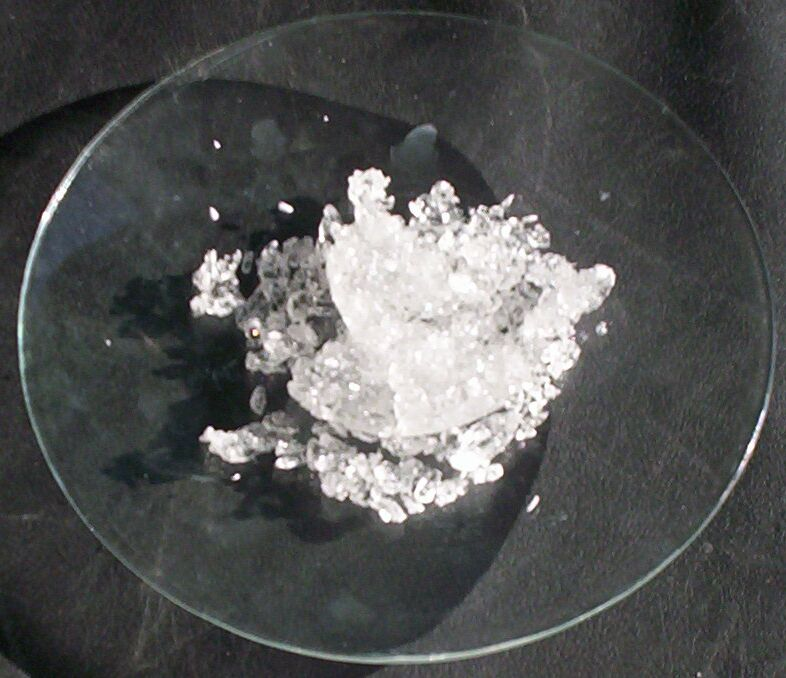

Identifiers
CAS Number	7790-69-4
3D model (JSmol)	Interactive image
ChemSpider	8305408
ECHA InfoCard	100.029.290
PubChem CID	10129889
RTECS number	QU9200000
UNII	68XG6U4533
CompTox Dashboard (EPA)	DTXSID90884437
- InChI: Key: IIPYXGDZVMZOAP-UHFFFAOYSA-N; InChI=1S/Li.NO3/c;2-1(3)4/q+1;-1 Key: IIPYXGDZVMZOAP-UHFFFAOYSA-N; InChI=1/Li.NO3/c;2-1(3)4/q+1;-1 Key: IIPYXGDZVMZOAP-UHFFFAOYAC
- SMILES: [Li+].[N+](=O)([O-])[O-]

Properties
Chemical formula	LiNO_{3}
Molar mass	68.946 g/mol
Appearance	White to light yellow solid
Density	2.38 g/cm^{3}
Melting point	255 °C (491 °F; 528 K)
Boiling point	600 °C (1,112 °F; 873 K) (decomposes)
Solubility in water	52.2 g/100 mL (20 °C); 90 g/100 mL (28 °C); 234 g/100 mL (100 °C)
Solubility	soluble in ethanol, methanol, pyridine, ammonia, acetone
Magnetic susceptibility (χ)	−62.0·10^{−6} cm^{3}/mol (+3 H_{2}O)
Refractive index (n_{D})	1.735

Thermochemistry
Heat capacity (C)	64 J/(mol K)
Std molar entropy (S^{⦵}_{298})	105 J/(mol K)
Std enthalpy of formation (Δ_{f}H^{⦵}_{298})	−7.007 kJ/g or −482.3 kJ/mol
Gibbs free energy (Δ_{f}G^{⦵})	−389.5 kJ/mol
Std enthalpy of combustion (Δ_{c}H^{⦵}_{298})	25.5 kJ/mol

Hazards
- Occupational safety and health (OHS/OSH)
Main hazards	Oxidant, irritant
NFPA 704 (fire diamond)	1 0 0 OX
Flash point	Non-flammable
- Lethal dose or concentration (LD, LC)
LD_{50} (median dose)	1426 mg/kg (oral, rat)

Related compounds
Other cations	Sodium nitrate Potassium nitrate Rubidium nitrate Caesium nitrate
Related compounds	Lithium sulfate Lithium chloride
- Except where otherwise noted, data are given for materials in their standard state (at 25 °C [77 °F], 100 kPa). verify (what is ?) Infobox references

Lithium nitrate is an inorganic compound with the formula LiNO_{3}. It is the lithium salt of nitric acid (an alkali metal nitrate). The salt is deliquescent, absorbing water to form the hydrated form, lithium nitrate trihydrate. Its eutectics are of interest for heat transfer fluids.

It is made by treating lithium carbonate or lithium hydroxide with nitric acid.

== Uses ==
This deliquescent colourless salt is an oxidizing agent used in the manufacture of red-colored fireworks and flares.

=== Thermal storage ===
The hydrated form, lithium nitrate trihydrate, has an extremely high specific heat of fusion, 287±7 J/g, and hence can be used for thermal energy storage at its melt temperature of 303.3 K.

Lithium nitrate has been proposed as a medium to store heat collected from the sun for cooking. A Fresnel lens would be used to melt solid lithium nitrate, which would then function as a "solar battery", allowing heat to be redistributed later by convection.

== Synthesis ==
Lithium nitrate can be synthesized by reacting nitric acid and lithium carbonate.

Li_{2}CO_{3} + 2 HNO_{3} → 2 LiNO_{3} + H_{2}O + CO_{2}

Generally when forming LiNO_{3}, a pH indicator is used to determine when all of the acid has been neutralized. However, this neutralization can also be recognized with the loss of carbon dioxide production. In order to rid the final product of excess water, the sample is heated.

== Toxicity ==
Lithium nitrate can be toxic to the body when ingested by targeting the central nervous system, thyroids, kidneys, and cardio-vascular system. When exposed to the skin, eyes, and mucous membranes, lithium nitrate can cause irritation to these areas.
