= Sodium nitrite =

Chemical compound

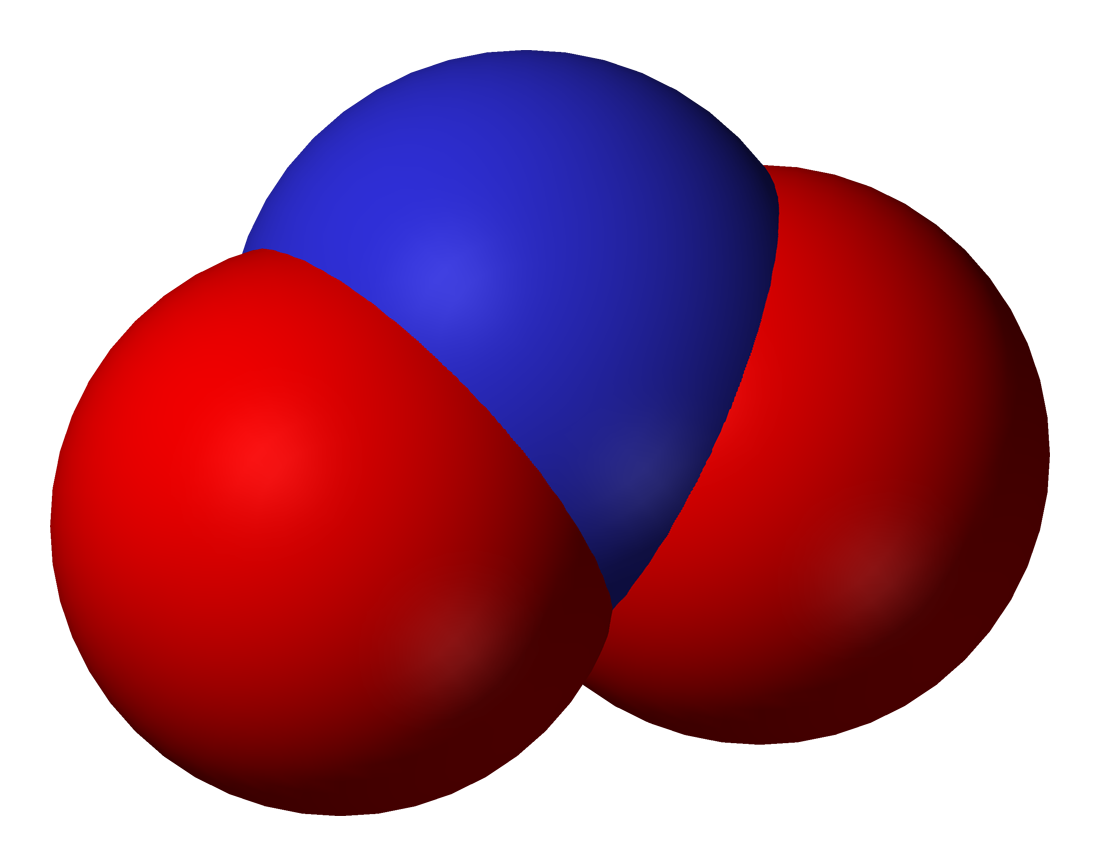
The nitrite anion (space-filling model)
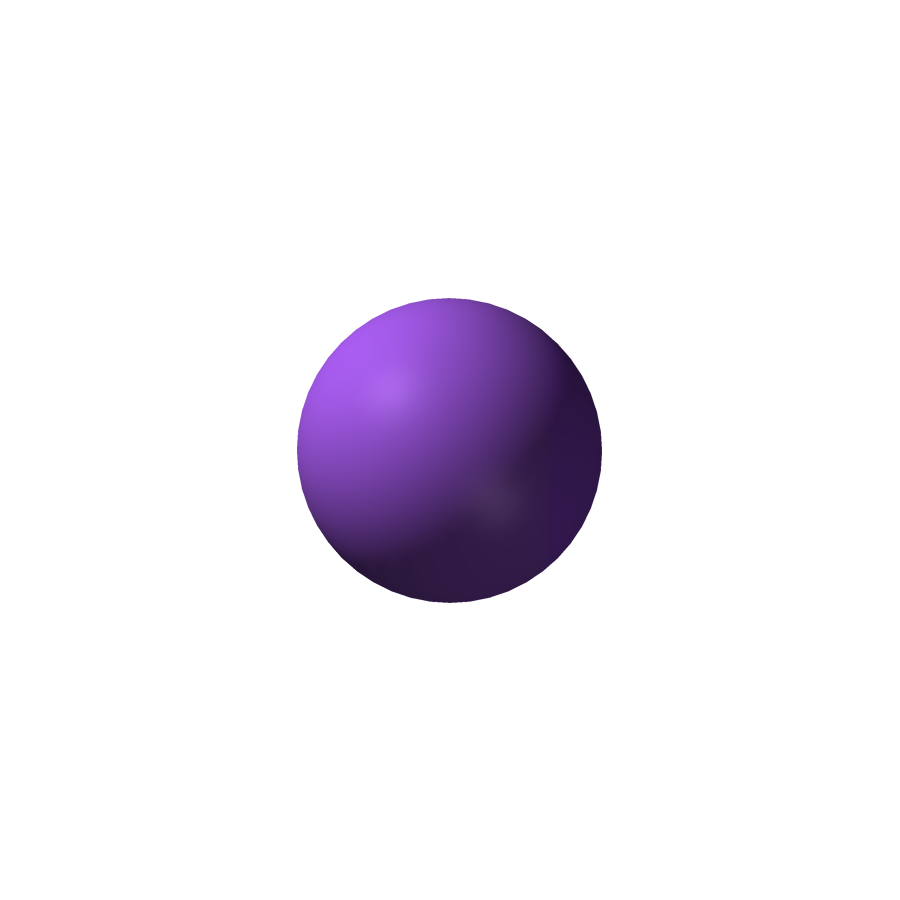
The sodium cation
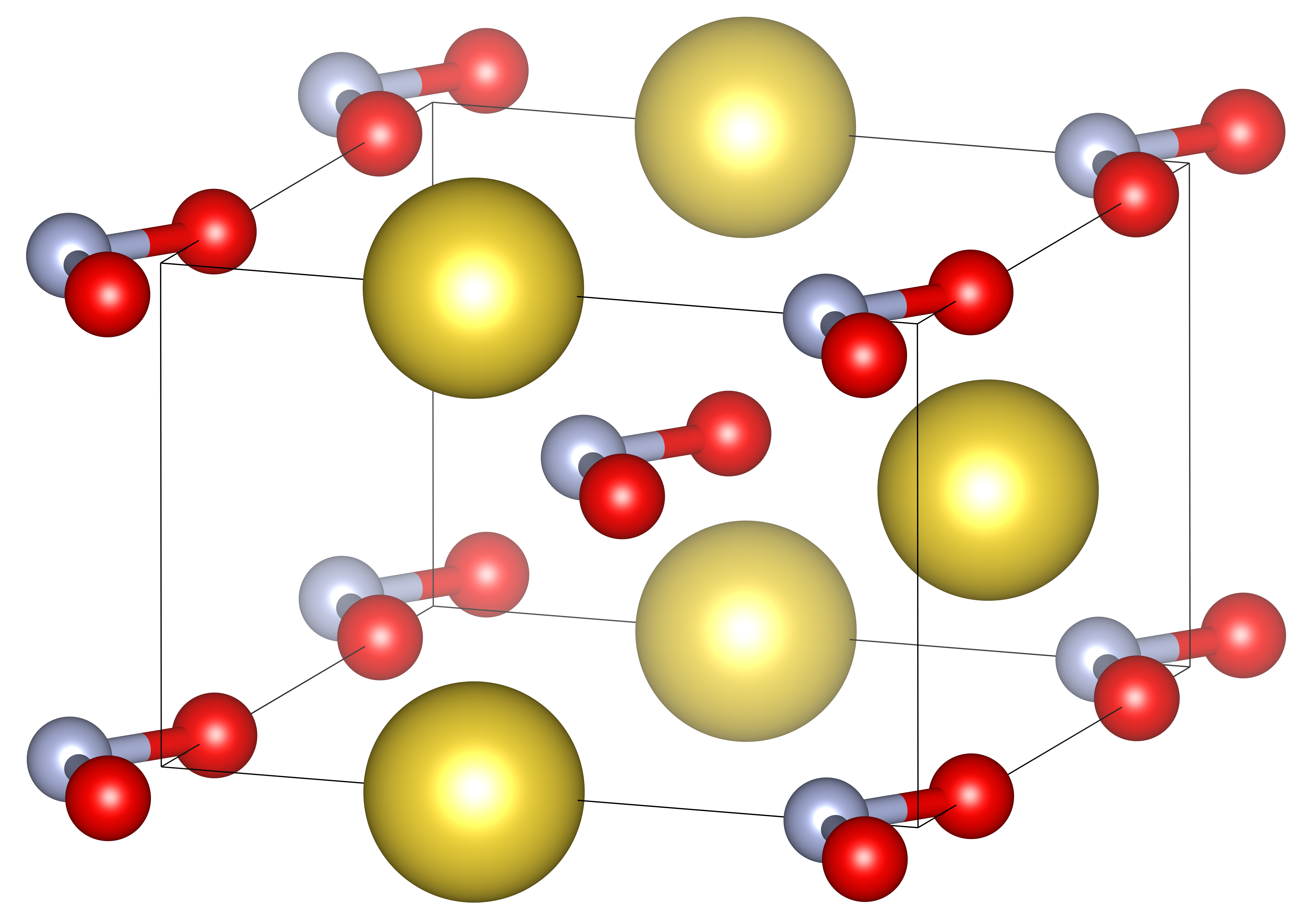
- Unit cell of sodium nitrite under standard conditions

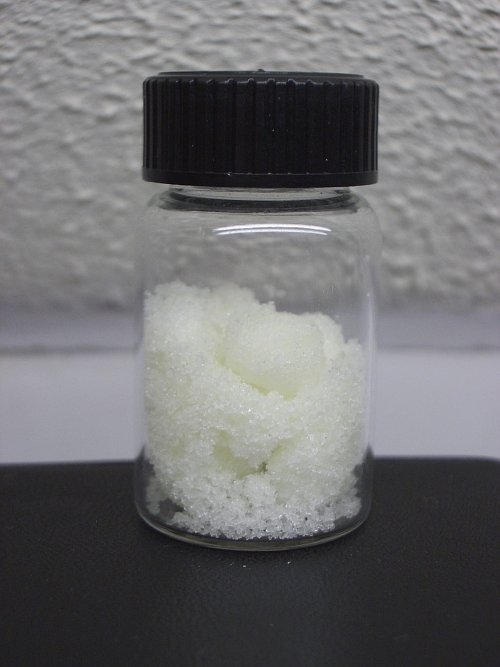
- Sodium nitrite

Names
- IUPAC name Sodium nitrite
- Preferred IUPAC name Sodium nitrite

Identifiers
CAS Number	7632-00-0
3D model (JSmol)	Interactive image
ChEBI	CHEBI:78870
ChEMBL	ChEMBL93268
ChemSpider	22689
ECHA InfoCard	100.028.687
EC Number	231-555-9
E number	E250 (preservatives)
KEGG	D05865
PubChem CID	23668193
RTECS number	RA1225000
UNII	M0KG633D4F
UN number	1500 3287
CompTox Dashboard (EPA)	DTXSID0020941
- InChI: InChI=1S/HNO2.Na/c2-1-3;/h(H,2,3);/q;+1/p-1 Key: LPXPTNMVRIOKMN-UHFFFAOYSA-M; InChI=1/HNO2.Na/c2-1-3;/h(H,2,3);/q;+1/p-1 Key: LPXPTNMVRIOKMN-REWHXWOFAO
- SMILES: N(=O)[O-].[Na+]

Properties
Chemical formula	NaNO_{2}
Molar mass	68.9953 g/mol
Appearance	white or slightly yellowish crystalline solid
Density	2.168 g/cm^{3}
Melting point	271 °C (520 °F; 544 K) (decomposes at 320 °C)
Solubility in water	71.4 g/(100 mL) (0 °C); 84.8 g/(100 mL) (25 °C); 160 g/(100 mL) (100 °C)
Solubility in methanol	4.4 g/(100 mL)
Solubility in ethanol	Soluble
Solubility in diethyl ether	0.3 g/(100 mL)
Solubility in ammonia	Very soluble
Acidity (pK_{a})	~9
Magnetic susceptibility (χ)	−14.5·10^{−6} cm^{3}/mol
Refractive index (n_{D})	1.65

Structure
Crystal structure	Orthorhombic
Space group	Im2m
Lattice constant	a = 3.5653(8) Å, b = 5.5728(7) Å, c = 5.3846(13) Å
Formula units (Z)	2

Thermochemistry
Std molar entropy (S^{⦵}_{298})	106 J/(mol·K)
Std enthalpy of formation (Δ_{f}H^{⦵}_{298})	−359 kJ/mol
Gibbs free energy (Δ_{f}G^{⦵})	−295 kJ/mol

Pharmacology
ATC code	V03AB08 (WHO)

Hazards
- GHS labelling
Pictograms	(GHS03: Oxidizing) (GHS06: Toxic) (GHS09: Environmental hazard)
Signal word	Danger
Hazard statements	H272, H301, H319, H400
Precautionary statements	P220, P273, P301+P310, P305+P351+P338
NFPA 704 (fire diamond)	3 0 1 OX
Autoignition temperature	489 °C (912 °F; 762 K)
- Lethal dose or concentration (LD, LC)
LD_{50} (median dose)	180 mg/kg (rats, oral)
Safety data sheet (SDS)	"Sodium nitrite". Safety Data Sheet. Sigma-Aldrich. 28 December 2022.

Related compounds
Other anions	Sodium nitrate
Other cations	Potassium nitrite; Ammonium nitrite; Lithium nitrite; Silver nitrite
Related compounds	Nitrous acid
- Except where otherwise noted, data are given for materials in their standard state (at 25 °C [77 °F], 100 kPa). verify (what is ?) Infobox references

Sodium nitrite is an inorganic compound with the chemical formula NaNO_{2}. It is a white to slightly yellowish crystalline powder that is very soluble in water and is hygroscopic. From an industrial perspective, it is the most important nitrite salt. It is a precursor to a variety of organic compounds, such as pharmaceuticals, dyes, and pesticides, but it is probably best known as a food additive used in processed meats and (in some countries) in fish products.

== Uses ==
=== Industrial chemistry ===
The main use of sodium nitrite is for the industrial production of organonitrogen compounds. It is a reagent for conversion of amines into diazo compounds, which are key precursors to many dyes, such as diazo dyes. Nitroso compounds are produced from nitrites. These are used in the rubber industry.

It is used in a variety of metallurgical applications, for phosphatizing and detinning.

Sodium nitrite is an effective corrosion inhibitor and is used as an additive in industrial greases, as an aqueous solution in closed loop cooling systems, and in a molten state as a heat transfer medium.

=== Food additive and preservative ===
Sodium nitrite is used to speed up the curing of meat, inhibit the germination of Clostridium botulinum spores, and also impart an attractive pink color. Nitrite reacts with the meat myoglobin to cause color changes, first converting to nitrosomyoglobin (bright red), then, on heating, to nitrosohemochrome (a pink pigment).

Historically, salt has been used for the preservation of meat. The salt-preserved meat product was usually brownish-gray in color. When sodium nitrite is added with the salt, the meat develops a red, then pink color, which is associated with cured meats such as ham, bacon, hot dogs, and bologna.

In the early 1900s, irregular curing was commonplace. This led to further research surrounding the use of sodium nitrite as an additive in food, standardizing the amount present in foods to minimize the amount needed while maximizing its food additive role. Through this research, sodium nitrite has been found to give taste and color to the meat and inhibit lipid oxidation that leads to rancidity, with varying degrees of effectiveness for controlling growth of disease-causing microorganisms. The ability of sodium nitrite to address the above-mentioned issues has led to production of meat with extended storage life and has improved desirable color and taste. According to scientists working for the meat industry, nitrite has improved food safety. This view is disputed in the light of the possible carcinogenic effects caused by adding nitrites to meat.

Nitrite has the E number E250. Potassium nitrite (E249) is used in the same way. It is approved for usage in the European Union, United States, and Australia and New Zealand.

In meat processing, sodium nitrite is never used in a pure state but always mixed with common salt. This mixture is known as nitrited salt, curing salt or nitrited curing salt. In Europe, nitrited curing salt contains between 99.1% and 99.5% common salt and between 0.5% and 0.9% nitrite. In the US, nitrited curing salt is dosed at 6.25% and must be remixed with salt before use.

==== Color and taste ====
The appearance and taste of meat is an important component of consumer acceptance. Sodium nitrite is responsible for the desirable red color (or shaded pink) of meat. Very little nitrite is needed to induce this change. It has been reported that as little as 2 to 14 parts per million (ppm) is needed to induce this desirable color change. However, to extend the lifespan of this color change, significantly higher levels are needed. The mechanism responsible for this color change is the formation of nitrosylating agents by nitrite, which has the ability to transfer nitric oxide that subsequently reacts with myoglobin to produce the cured meat color. The unique taste associated with cured meat is also affected by the addition of sodium nitrite. However, the mechanism underlying this change in taste is still not fully understood.

==== Inhibition of microbial pathogens ====
In conjunction with salt and pH levels, sodium nitrite reduces the ability of Clostridium botulinum spores to grow to the point of producing toxin. Some dry-cured meat products are manufactured without nitrites. For example, Parma ham, which has been produced without nitrite since 1993, was reported in 2018 to have caused no cases of botulism. This is because the interior of the muscle is sterile and the surface is exposed to oxygen. Other manufacture processes do not assure these conditions, and reduction of nitrite results in toxin production.

Sodium nitrite has shown varying degrees of effectiveness for controlling growth of other spoilage or disease causing microorganisms. Although the inhibitory mechanisms are not well known, its effectiveness depends on several factors including residual nitrite level, pH, salt concentration, reductants present and iron content. The type of bacteria also affects sodium nitrite's effectiveness. It is generally agreed that sodium nitrite is not effective for controlling Gram-negative enteric pathogens such as Salmonella and Escherichia coli.

Other food additives (such as lactate and sorbate) provide similar protection against bacteria, but do not provide the desired pink color.

==== Inhibition of lipid peroxidation ====
Sodium nitrite is also able to effectively delay the development of oxidative rancidity. Lipid peroxidation is considered to be a major reason for the deterioration of quality of meat products (rancidity and unappetizing flavors). Sodium nitrite acts as an antioxidant in a mechanism similar to the one responsible for the coloring effect. Nitrite reacts with heme proteins and metal ions, neutralizing free radicals by nitric oxide (one of its byproducts). Neutralization of these free radicals terminates the cycle of lipid oxidation that leads to rancidity.

=== Medication ===
Sodium nitrite
- Chemical structure

Clinical data
- AHFS/Drugs.com: FDA Professional Drug Information
- Pregnancy category: AU: Exempt
- ATC code: V03AB08 (WHO)

Legal status
- Legal status: AU: S4 (Prescription only); US: ℞-only

Identifiers
- CAS Number: 7632-00-0
- PubChem CID: 24269
- DrugBank: DB09112
- ChemSpider: 22689
- UNII: M0KG633D4F
- KEGG: D05865
- E number: E250 (preservatives)
- CompTox Dashboard (EPA): DTXSID0020941
- ECHA InfoCard: 100.028.687

Chemical and physical data
- Formula: NNaO_{2}
- Molar mass: 68.995 g·mol^{−1}
- 3D model (JSmol): Interactive image
- SMILES: N(=O)[O-].[Na+]
- InChI: InChI=1S/HNO2.Na/c2-1-3;/h(H,2,3);/q;+1/p-1; Key:LPXPTNMVRIOKMN-UHFFFAOYSA-M

Sodium nitrite is used as a medication together with sodium thiosulfate to treat cyanide poisoning. It is recommended only in severe cases of cyanide poisoning and has largely been replaced by use of hydroxocobalamin, a form of vitamin B_{12}, but given in much higher doses than needed nutritionally. In those who have both cyanide poisoning and carbon monoxide poisoning sodium thiosulfate by itself is usually recommended if the facility does not have sufficient hydroxycobalamin. It is given by slow injection into a vein.

NaNO_{2} side effects are chiefly related to creation of methemoglobinemia and vasodilation. Side effects can include low blood pressure, headache, shortness of breath, loss of consciousness, and vomiting. Greater care should be taken in people with underlying heart disease. The patient's levels of methemoglobin should be regularly checked during treatment. While not well studied during pregnancy, there is some evidence of potential harm to the baby. Sodium nitrite works by creating methemoglobin, where the iron atom at the center of the heme group is in the oxidized ferric (Fe^{3+}) state, which binds with cyanide with greater affinity than its binding to the cytochrome C oxidase, and thus removes it from blocking the metabolic function of mitochondria.

Sodium nitrite came into medical use in the 1920s and 1930s. It is on the World Health Organization's List of Essential Medicines.

=== Suicide ===
Several academic publications in 2020 and 2021 discussed the toxicity of sodium nitrite, and an apparent recent increase in suicides using sodium nitrite which had been ordered online. The usage of sodium nitrite as a suicide method has been heavily discussed on suicide forums, primarily Sanctioned Suicide.

Sodium nitrite was also the focal-point of the McCarthy et al. v Amazon lawsuit alleging that Amazon knowingly assisted in the deaths of healthy children by selling them "suicide kits" as Amazon's "frequently bought together" feature recommended buying sodium nitrite, an antiemetic, and a suicide instruction book together. This lawsuit was dismissed in June 2023. On February 19, 2026, the Washington Supreme Court ruled unanimously that Amazon.com must face lawsuits brought by families with relatives who took their own lives by consuming sodium nitrite they bought on the online retailer's platform. It rejected a lower court's ruling that the families could not pursue negligence claims under a Washington state product liability law, because suicide was a superseding cause of their relatives' deaths. The online marketplace eBay has globally prohibited the sale of sodium nitrite since 2019. In 2023, legislation was introduced in the United States with the aim of deeming sodium nitrite products with a sodium nitrite concentration of greater than 10% by volume to be banned consumer products under the Consumer Product Safety Act. Kenneth Law, a Canadian distributor of sodium nitrite, was convicted of assisting suicide in 2026.

In cases of suspected suicide attempts involving sodium nitrite, it is critical that responding individuals administer immediate intravenous methylene blue. Methylene blue is the antidote to the methemoglobinemia caused by intentional ingestion of sodium nitrite as a suicide agent.

== Toxicity ==
Sodium nitrite is toxic. The LD_{50} in rats is 180 mg/kg and in humans LD_{Lo} is 71 mg/kg i.e., between 0.7 and 6 g. The mechanism by which sodium nitrite causes death is methemoglobinemia. The oftentimes severe methemoglobinemia found in sodium nitrite poisoning cases results in systemic hypoxia, metabolic acidosis, and cyanosis. The reported signs of sodium nitrite poisoning are as follows:

Symptoms of [nitrite] poisoning can vary depending on the amount and duration of the exposure. Those with very mild methemoglobinemia might not have any symptoms at all, or might appear a little pale and feel tired. Moderate-to-severe poisoning is associated with cyanosis (blueness of the skin), confusion, loss of consciousness, seizures, abnormal heart rhythms, and death.

With prompt action, sodium nitrite poisoning is reversible using an antidote, methylene blue. It has been reported that sodium nitrite poisoning can also be detected post-mortem:

Postmortem detection of [methemoglobinemia] is typically established via screening techniques such as scene evidence suggesting fatal consumption of a toxic salt in addition to the characteristic grey-purple lividity observed upon the body. The diagnosis can be established via postmortem blood testing demonstrating elevated methemoglobin saturation. Additionally, we have confirmed that postmortem MRI in cases of [methemoglobinemia] demonstrates a T1-bright (hyperintense) signal of the blood; both within intracardiac blood on chest MRIs and postmortem blood samples in tubes.

Death by sodium nitrite ingestion can happen at lower doses than the previously known LD_{Lo}. Sodium nitrite has been used for homicide and suicide. To prevent accidental intoxication, sodium nitrite (blended with salt) sold as a food additive in the US is dyed bright pink to avoid mistaking it for plain salt or sugar. In other countries, nitrited curing salt is not dyed but is strictly regulated.

=== Occurrence in vegetables ===
Nitrites do not occur naturally in vegetables in significant quantities, but deliberate fermentation of celery juice, for instance, with a naturally high level of nitrates, can produce nitrite levels sufficient for commercial meat curing. Boiling vegetables does not affect nitrite levels.

The presence of nitrite in animal tissue is a consequence of metabolism of nitric oxide, a neurotransmitter. Nitric oxide can be generated de novo from nitric oxide synthase utilizing arginine or from ingested nitrite.

=== Pigs ===
Due to sodium nitrite's high level of toxicity to swine (Sus scrofa) it is now being developed in Australia to control feral pigs and wild boar. The sodium nitrite induces methemoglobinemia in swine, i.e. it reduces the amount of oxygen that is released from hemoglobin, so the animal will feel faint and pass out, and then die in a humane manner after first being rendered unconscious. The Texas Parks and Wildlife Department operates a research facility at Kerr Wildlife Management Area, where they examine feral pig feeding preferences and bait tactics to administer sodium nitrite.

=== Cancer ===
The World Health Organization (WHO) advises that there was sufficient evidence that "processed meats" caused cancer, particularly colon cancer, and the WHO's International Agency for Research on Cancer (IARC) classified "processed meats" as carcinogenic to humans (Group 1); "processed meat" referring to meat that has been transformed through salting, curing, fermentation, smoking, or other processes to enhance flavour or improve preservation.

Nitrosamines can be formed during the curing process used to preserve meats, when sodium nitrite-treated meat is cooked, and also from the reaction of nitrite with secondary amines under acidic conditions (such as occurs in the human stomach). Dietary sources of nitrosamines include US cured meats preserved with sodium nitrite as well as the dried salted fish eaten in Japan. In the 1920s, a significant change in US meat curing practices resulted in a 69% decrease in average nitrite content. This event preceded the beginning of a dramatic decline in gastric cancer mortality. Around 1970, it was found that ascorbic acid (vitamin C), an antioxidant, inhibits nitrosamine formation. Consequently, the addition of at least 550 ppm of ascorbic acid is required in meats manufactured in the United States. Manufacturers sometimes instead use erythorbic acid, a cheaper but equally effective isomer of ascorbic acid. Additionally, manufacturers may include α-tocopherol (vitamin E) to further inhibit nitrosamine production. α-Tocopherol, ascorbic acid, and erythorbic acid all inhibit nitrosamine production by their oxidation-reduction properties. Ascorbic acid, for example, forms dehydroascorbic acid when oxidized, which when in the presence of nitrosonium, a potent nitrosating agent formed from sodium nitrite, reduces the nitrosonium into nitric oxide. The nitrosonium ion formed in acidic nitrite solutions is commonly mislabeled nitrous anhydride, an unstable nitrogen oxide that cannot exist in vitro.

Ingesting nitrite under conditions that result in endogenous nitrosation has been classified as "probably carcinogenic to humans" by International Agency for Research on Cancer (IARC).

== Production ==
Industrial production of sodium nitrite follows one of two processes, the reduction of nitrate salts, or the oxidation of lower nitrogen oxides.

One method uses molten sodium nitrate as the salt, and lead which is oxidized, while a more modern method uses scrap iron filings to reduce the nitrate.

NaNO_{3} + Pb → NaNO_{2} + PbO
NO^{−}_{3} + Fe + 2H^{+} → NO^{−}_{2} + Fe^{2+} + H_{2}O

A more commonly used method involves the general reaction of nitrogen oxides in alkaline aqueous solution, with the addition of a catalyst. The exact conditions depend on which nitrogen oxides are used, and what the oxidant is, as the conditions need to be carefully controlled to avoid over oxidation of the nitrogen atom.

2 NaOH + NO_{2} + NO → 2 NaNO_{2} + H_{2}O
2 NaOH + N_{2}O_{3} → 2 NaNO_{2} + H_{2}O

Sodium nitrite has also been produced by reduction of nitrate salts by exposure to heat, light, ionizing radiation, metals, hydrogen, and electrolytic reduction.

NaNO_{3} + CaSO_{3} → NaNO_{2} + CaSO_{4}

== Chemical reactions ==
In the laboratory, sodium nitrite can be used to destroy excess sodium azide.

2 NaN_{3} + 2 NaNO_{2} + 4 H^{+} → 3 N_{2} + 2 NO + 4 Na^{+} + 2 H_{2}O

Above 330 °C sodium nitrite decomposes (in air) to sodium oxide, nitric oxide and nitrogen dioxide.

2 NaNO_{2} → Na_{2}O + NO + NO_{2}

Sodium nitrite can also be used in the production of nitrous acid:

2 NaNO_{2} + H_{2}SO_{4} → 2 HNO_{2} + Na_{2}SO_{4}

The nitrous acid then, under normal conditions, decomposes:

2 HNO_{2} → NO_{2} + NO + H_{2}O

The resulting nitrogen dioxide hydrolyzes to a mixture of nitric and nitrous acids:

2 NO_{2} + H_{2}O → HNO_{3} + HNO_{2}

== Isotope labelling ^{15}N ==
15N isotope enriched NaNO2

In organic synthesis isotope enriched sodium nitrite-^{15}N can be used instead of normal sodium nitrite as their reactivity is nearly identical in most reactions.

The obtained products carry isotope ^{15}N and hence nitrogen NMR can be efficiently carried out.
