= Nitrosyl chloride =

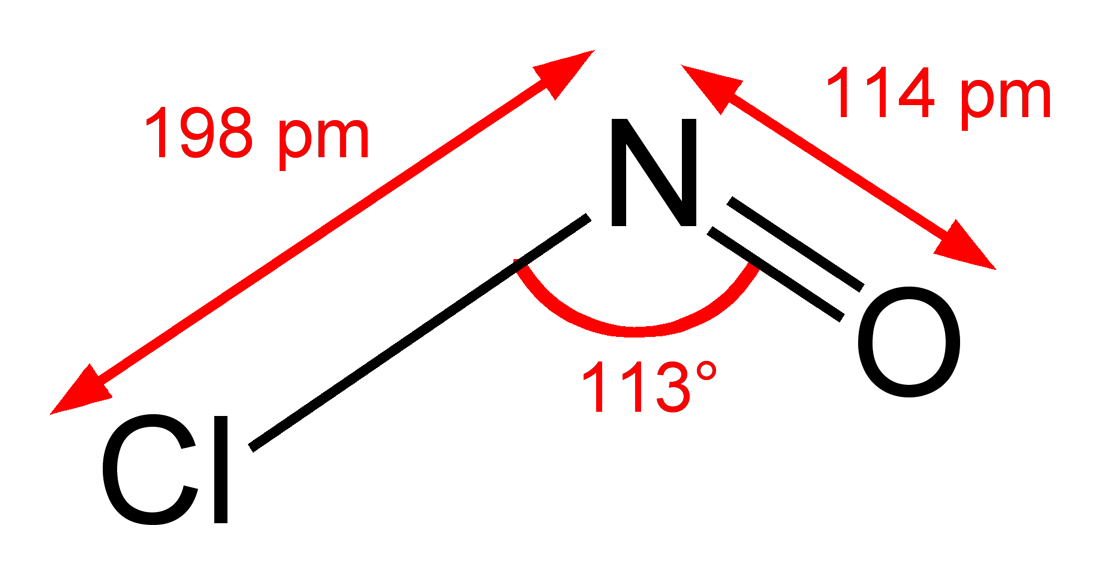
- Skeletal formula of nitrosyl chloride with measurements

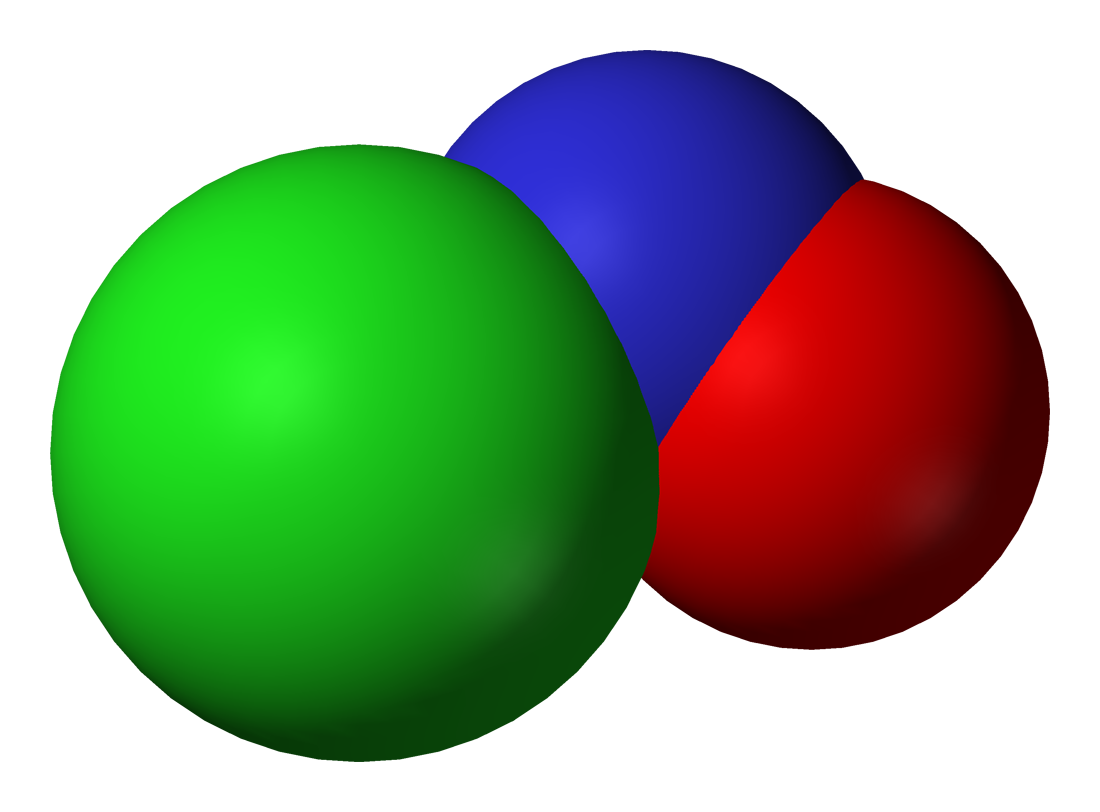
- Spacefill model of nitrosyl chloride

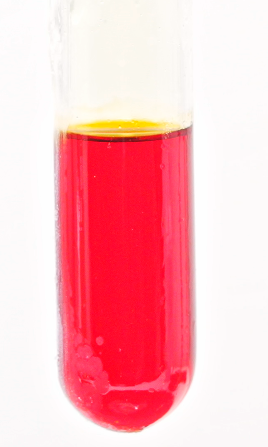

Names
- IUPAC name Nitrosyl chloride

Identifiers
| CAS Number | 2696-92-6 |
| 3D model (JSmol) | Interactive image |
| ChemSpider | 16641 |
| ECHA InfoCard | 100.018.430 |
| EC Number | 220-273-1 |
| E number | E919 (glazing agents, ...) |
| MeSH | nitrosyl+chloride |
| PubChem CID | 17601 |
| RTECS number | QZ7883000 |
| UNII | NHE5I1E5H6 |
| UN number | 1069 |
| CompTox Dashboard (EPA) | DTXSID5051945 |
- InChI: InChI=1S/ClNO/c1-2-3 Key: VPCDQGACGWYTMC-UHFFFAOYSA-N
- SMILES: ClN=O

Properties
| Chemical formula | NOCl |
| Molar mass | 65.459 g mol^{−1} |
| Appearance | yellow gas |
| Density | 2.872 mg mL^{−1} |
| Melting point | −59.4 °C (−74.9 °F; 213.8 K) |
| Boiling point | −5.55 °C (22.01 °F; 267.60 K) |
| Solubility in water | Reacts |

Structure
| Molecular shape | Dihedral, digonal |
| Hybridisation | sp^{2} at N |
| Dipole moment | 1.90 D |

Thermochemistry
| Std molar entropy (S^{⦵}_{298}) | 261.68 J K^{−1} mol^{−1} |
| Std enthalpy of formation (Δ_{f}H^{⦵}_{298}) | 51.71 kJ mol^{−1} |

Hazards
| NFPA 704 (fire diamond) | 3 0 1 W; OX |
| Safety data sheet (SDS) | inchem.org |

Related compounds
| Related compounds | Nitroxyl; Nitrosyl fluoride; Nitrosyl bromide; Nitrosyl iodide; Nitryl chloride; Chlorine nitrate |
- Except where otherwise noted, data are given for materials in their standard state (at 25 °C [77 °F], 100 kPa). verify (what is ?) Infobox references

Nitrosyl chloride is the chemical compound with the formula NOCl. It is a yellow gas that is commonly encountered as a component of aqua regia, a mixture of 3 parts concentrated hydrochloric acid and 1 part of concentrated nitric acid. It is a strong electrophile and oxidizing agent. It is sometimes called Tilden's reagent, after William A. Tilden, who was the first to produce it as a pure compound.

== Structure and synthesis ==
The molecule is bent. A double bond exists between N and O (distance = 1.16 Å) and a single bond between N and Cl (distance = 1.96 Å). The O=N–Cl angle is 113°.

=== Production ===
Nitrosyl chloride can be produced in many ways.

- Combining nitrosylsulfuric acid and HCl affords the compound. This method is used industrially.

HCl + NOHSO_{4} → H_{2}SO_{4} + NOCl

- A more convenient laboratory method involves the (reversible) dehydration of nitrous acid by HCl

HNO_{2} + HCl → H_{2}O + NOCl

- By the direct combination of chlorine and nitric oxide; This reaction reverses above 100 °C.

Cl_{2} + 2 NO → 2 NOCl

- By reduction of nitrogen dioxide with hydrogen chloride:

2NO_{2} + 4 HCl → 2NOCl + 2H_{2}O + Cl_{2}

=== Occurrence in aqua regia ===
NOCl also arises from the combination of hydrochloric and nitric acids according to the following reaction:

HNO_{3} + 3 HCl → 2[Cl] + 2 H_{2}O + NOCl

In nitric acid, NOCl is readily oxidized into nitrogen dioxide. The presence of NOCl in aqua regia was described by Edmund Davy in 1831.

== Reactions ==
NOCl behaves as an electrophile and an oxidant in most of its reactions. With halide acceptors it gives nitrosonium salts, and synthesis of nitrosonium tetrachloroferrate is typically performed in liquid NOCl:

NOCl + FeCl_{3} → [NO]^{+}[FeCl_{4}]^{−}

In a related reaction, sulfuric acid gives nitrosylsulfuric acid, the mixed acid anhydride of nitrous and sulfuric acid:

ClNO + H_{2}SO_{4} → ONHSO_{4} + HCl

NOCl reacts with silver thiocyanate to give silver chloride and the pseudohalogen nitrosyl thiocyanate:

ClNO + AgSCN → AgCl + ONSCN

Similarly, it reacts with silver cyanide to give nitrosyl cyanide.

Nitrosyl chloride is used to prepare metal nitrosyl complexes. With molybdenum hexacarbonyl, NOCl gives the dinitrosyldichloride complex:

Mo(CO)_{6} + 2 NOCl → MoCl_{2}(NO)_{2} + 6 CO

It dissolves platinum:

Pt + 6 NOCl → (NO^{+})_{2}[PtCl_{6}]^{2-} + 4 NO

=== Applications in organic synthesis ===
Aside from its role in the production of caprolactam, NOCl finds some other uses in organic synthesis. It adds to alkenes to afford α-chloro oximes. The addition of NOCl follows the Markovnikov rule. Ketenes also add NOCl, giving nitrosyl derivatives:

H_{2}C=C=O + NOCl → ONCH_{2}C(O)Cl

Carbonyl compounds enolize; and then NOCl attacks the nucleophilic end of the alkene to give a vicinal keto- or aldo-oxime.

Epoxides react with NOCl to give an α-chloronitritoalkyl derivatives. In the case of propylene oxide, the addition proceeds with high regiochemistry:

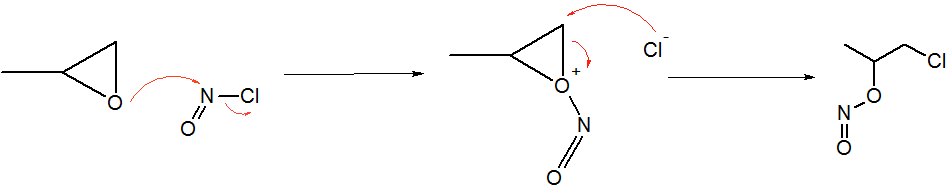

It converts amides to N-nitroso derivatives. NOCl converts some cyclic amines to the alkenes. For example, aziridine reacts with NOCl to give ethene, nitrous oxide and hydrogen chloride.

== Industrial applications ==
NOCl and cyclohexane react photochemically to give cyclohexanone oxime hydrochloride. This process exploits the tendency of NOCl to undergo photodissociation into NO and Cl radicals. The cyclohexanone oxime is converted to caprolactam, a precursor to nylon-6.

== Historical importance ==
Before the advent of modern spectroscopic methods for chemical analysis, informative chemical degradation and structure elucidation required the characterization of the individual components of various extracts. Notably, the aforementioned introduction of nitrosyl chloride by Tilden in 1875, as a reagent for producing crystalline derivatives of terpenes, e.g. α-pinene from oil of turpentine allowed investigators to readily distinguish one terpene from another.:

== Safety ==
Nitrosyl chloride is very toxic and irritating to the lungs, eyes, and skin.

== Bibliography ==
- Williams, D. L. H. (1988). Nitrosation. Cambridge, UK: Cambridge University. ISBN 0-521-26796-X.
