= Solid acid =

Acid that is insoluble in the reaction medium

Solid acids are acids that are insoluble in the reaction medium. They are often used as heterogeneous catalysts. Many solid acids are zeolites. A variety of techniques are used to quantify the strength of solid acids.

== Examples ==
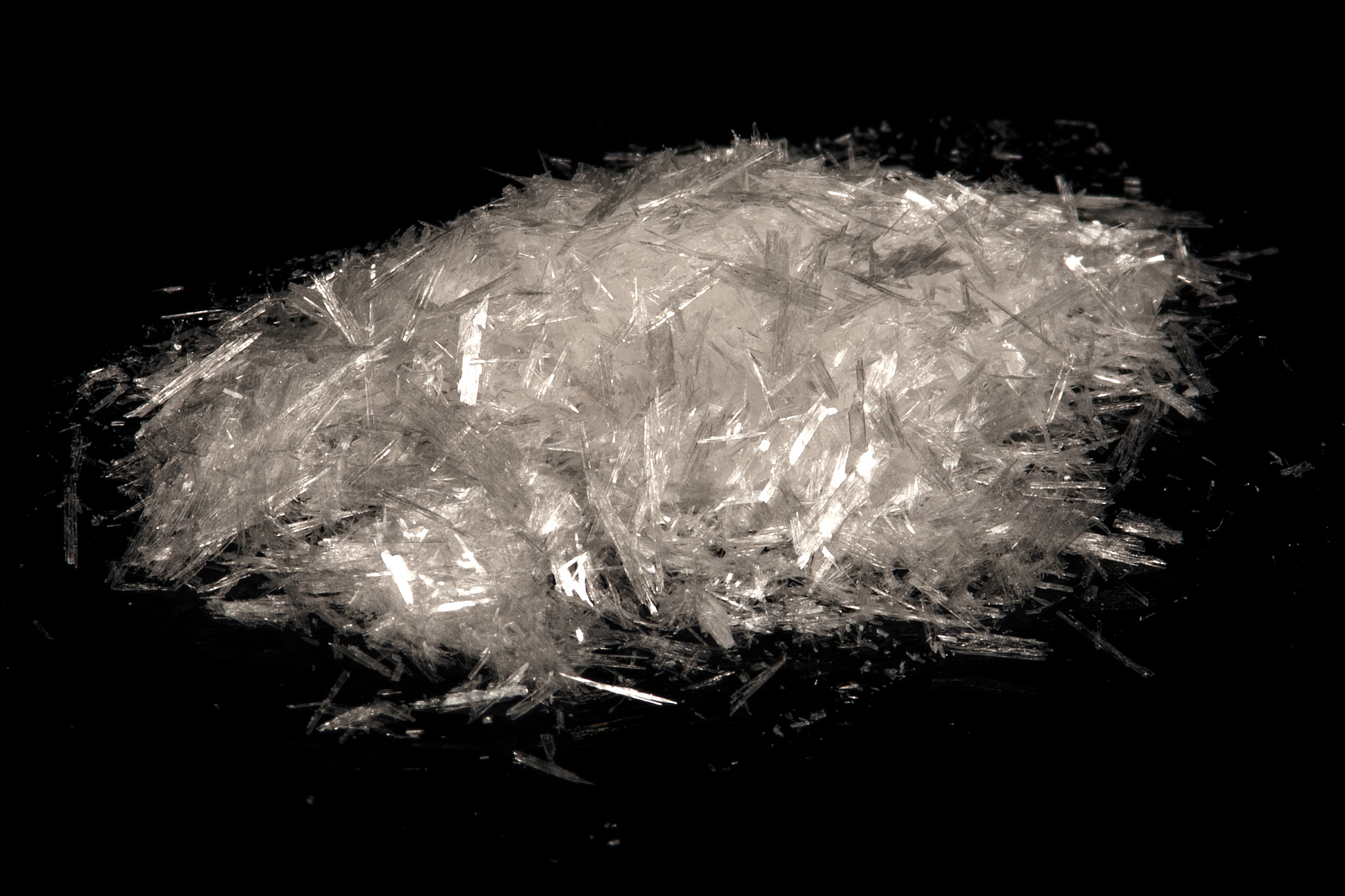
Crystalline benzoic acid shown here is a solid and an acid, but, in the context of this article, it is not a "solid acid", which are polymeric materials and typically stronger acids.

Examples of inorganic solid acids include silico-aluminates (zeolites, alumina, silico-aluminophosphate), and sulfated zirconia. Many transition metal oxides are acidic, including titania, zirconia, and niobia. Such acids are used in cracking. Many solid Brønsted acids are also employed industrially, including polystyrene sulfonate, solid phosphoric acid, niobic acid, and heteropolyoxometallates.

== Applications ==
Solid acids are used in catalysis in many industrial chemical processes, from large-scale catalytic cracking in petroleum refining to the synthesis of various fine chemicals.

One large scale application is alkylation, e.g., the combination of benzene and ethylene to give ethylbenzene. Another application is the rearrangement of cyclohexanone oxime to caprolactam. Many alkylamines are prepared by amination of alcohols, catalyzed by solid acids.

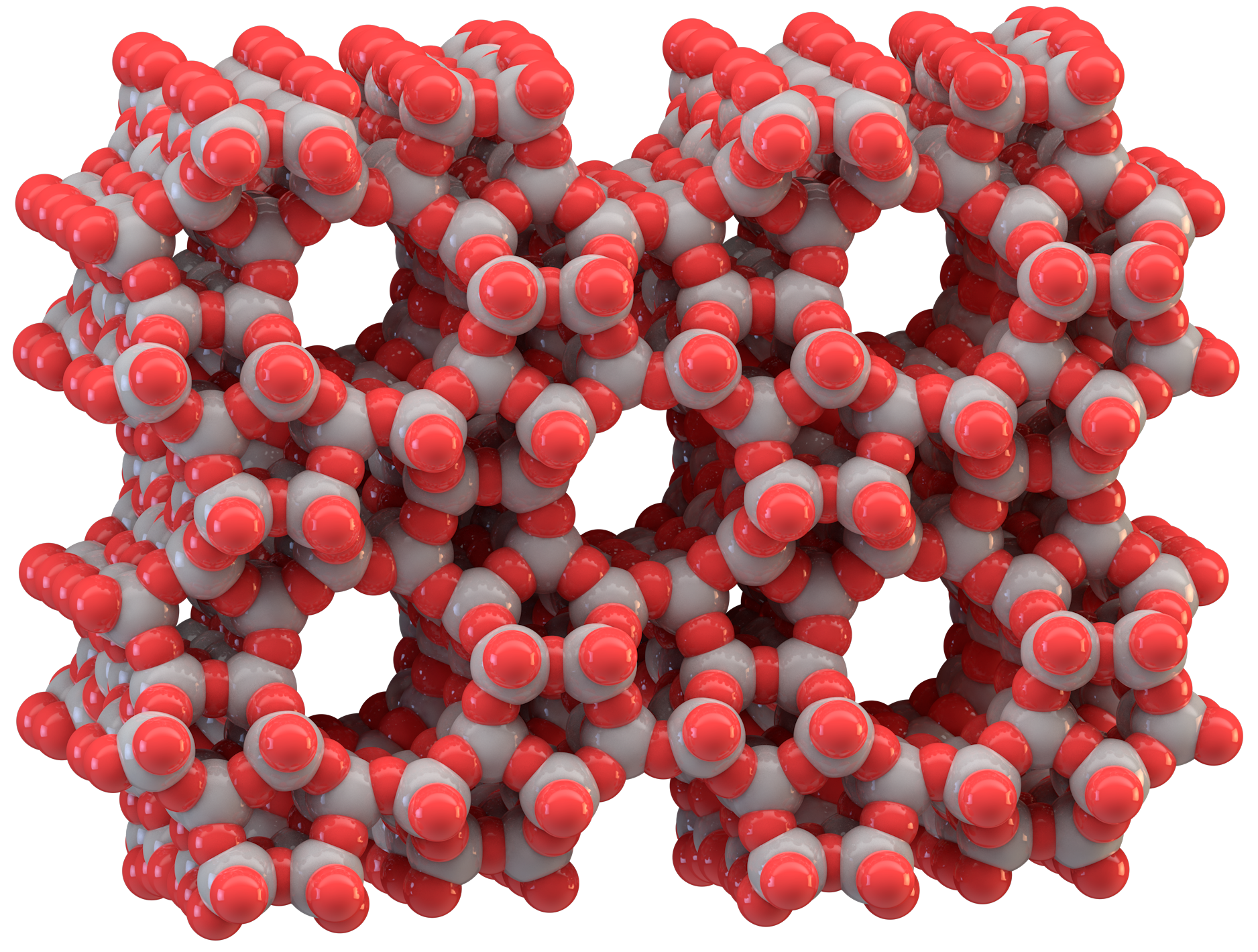
Zeolite, ZSM-5 is widely used as a solid acid catalyst.

Acylations are also catalyzed by solid acids.

Solid acids can be used as electrolytes in fuel cells.
