= Iodine nitrate =

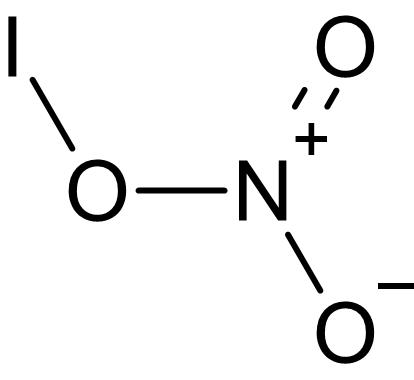

Names
- IUPAC name iodo nitrate

Identifiers
| CAS Number | 14696-81-2 |
| 3D model (JSmol) | Interactive image |
| ChemSpider | 67165553 |
| PubChem CID | 13406959 |
| CompTox Dashboard (EPA) | DTXSID001336624 |
- InChI: InChI=1S/INO3/c1-5-2(3)4 Key: CCJHDZZUWZIVJF-UHFFFAOYSA-N
- SMILES: [N+](=O)([O-])OI

Properties
| Chemical formula | INO_{3} |
| Molar mass | 188.908 g·mol^{−1} |

Related compounds
| Related compounds | Fluorine nitrate; Chlorine nitrate; Bromine nitrate |
- Except where otherwise noted, data are given for materials in their standard state (at 25 °C [77 °F], 100 kPa). Infobox references

Iodine nitrate is a chemical with formula INO_{3}. It is a covalent molecule with a structure of I–O–NO_{2}.

== Preparation ==
The compound was first produced by the reaction of mercury(II) nitrate and iodine in ether.

Other nitrate salts and solvents can also be used.

As a gas it is slightly unstable, decaying with a rate constant of −3.2×10^{−2} s^{−1}. The possible formation of this chemical in the atmosphere and its ability to destroy ozone have been studied. Potential reactions in this context are:

IONO_{2} → IO + NO_{2}
IONO_{2} → I + NO_{3}
I + O_{3} → IO + O_{2}
