= Nitrosyl fluoride =

Chemical compound

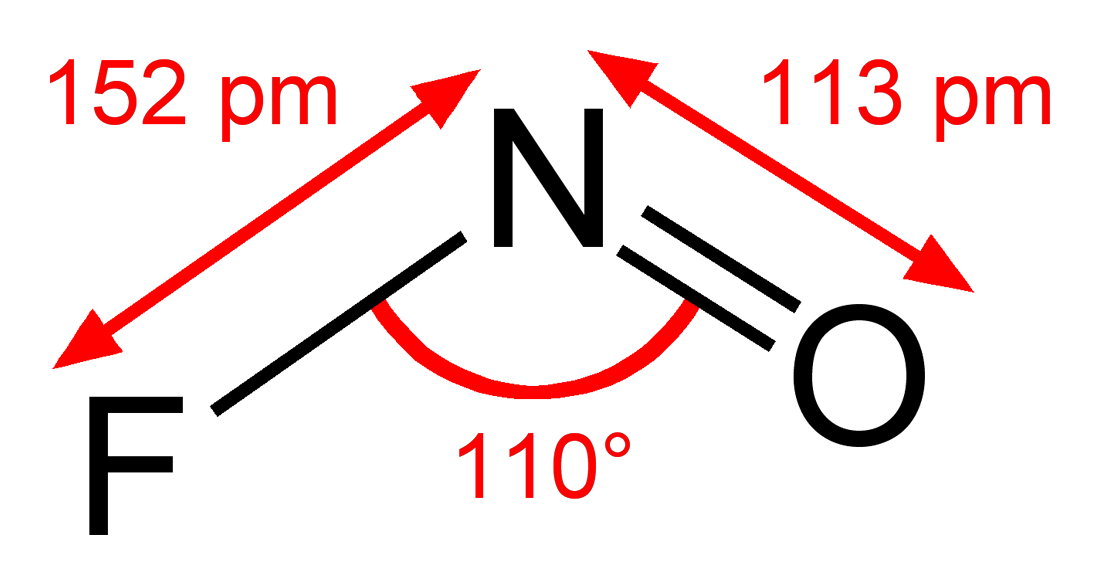
- Skeletal formula of nitrosyl fluoride with measurements

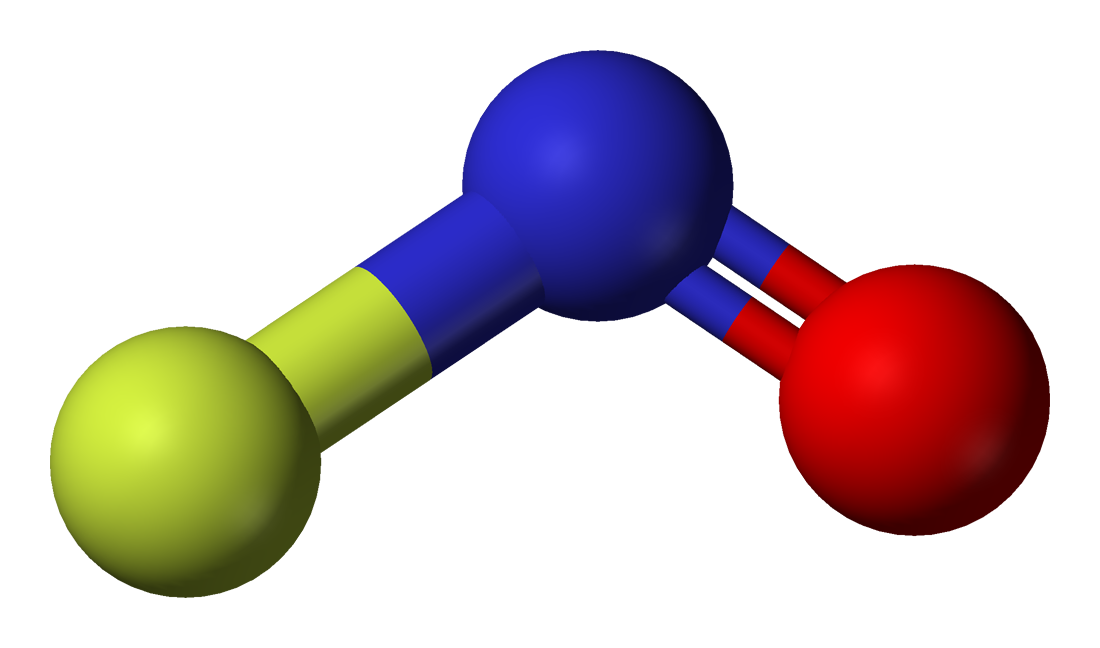
- Ball and stick model of nitrosyl fluoride

Names
- IUPAC name Nitrosyl fluoride
- Other names Nitrogen oxyfluoride

Identifiers
CAS Number	7789-25-5
3D model (JSmol)	Interactive image
Abbreviations	NOF
ChemSpider	109874
ECHA InfoCard	100.029.230
EC Number	232-153-6
PubChem CID	123261
UNII	9FXL2Q69DQ
CompTox Dashboard (EPA)	DTXSID60228501
- InChI: InChI=1S/FNO/c1-2-3 Key: ZEIYBPGWHWECHV-UHFFFAOYSA-N
- SMILES: FN=O

Properties
Chemical formula	NOF
Molar mass	49.0045 g mol^{−1}
Appearance	Colourless gas
Density	2.657 mg mL^{−1}(gas) 1.326 g/cm^{3}(liquid)
Melting point	−132.5 °C (−206.5 °F; 140.7 K)
Boiling point	−59.9 °C (−75.8 °F; 213.2 K)
Solubility in water	Reacts

Related compounds
Related compounds	Nitroxyl; Nitrosyl chloride; Nitrosyl bromide; Nitrosyl iodide
- Except where otherwise noted, data are given for materials in their standard state (at 25 °C [77 °F], 100 kPa). verify (what is ?) Infobox references

Nitrosyl fluoride (NOF) is a covalently bonded nitrosyl compound.

== Physical properties ==
The compound is a colorless gas, with bent molecular shape. The VSEPR model explains this geometry via a lone-pair of electrons on the nitrogen atom.

== Chemistry ==
Nitrosyl fluoride is typically produced by direct reaction of nitric oxide and fluorine, although halogenation with a perfluorinated metal salt is also possible. The compound is a highly reactive fluorinating agent that converts many metals to their fluorides, releasing nitric oxide in the process:

n NOF + M → MF_{n} + n NO

For this reason, aqueous NOF solutions are, like aqua regia, powerful solvents for metals.

Absent an oxidizable metal, NOF reacts with water to form nitrous acid, which then disproportionates to nitric acid:

NOF + H_{2}O → HNO_{2} + HF

3 HNO_{2} → HNO_{3} + 2 NO + H_{2}O

These reactions occur in both acidic and basic solutions.

Nitrosyl fluoride also forms salt-like adducts with Lewis-acidic fluorides; for example, BF_{3} reacts to give NOBF_{4}. Similarly, the compound nitrosylates compounds with a free proton; thus alcohols convert to nitrites:

ROH + NOF → RONO + HF

== Uses ==
Nitrosyl fluoride is used as a solvent and as a fluorinating and nitrating agent in organic synthesis.
