= Nitrosyl iodide =

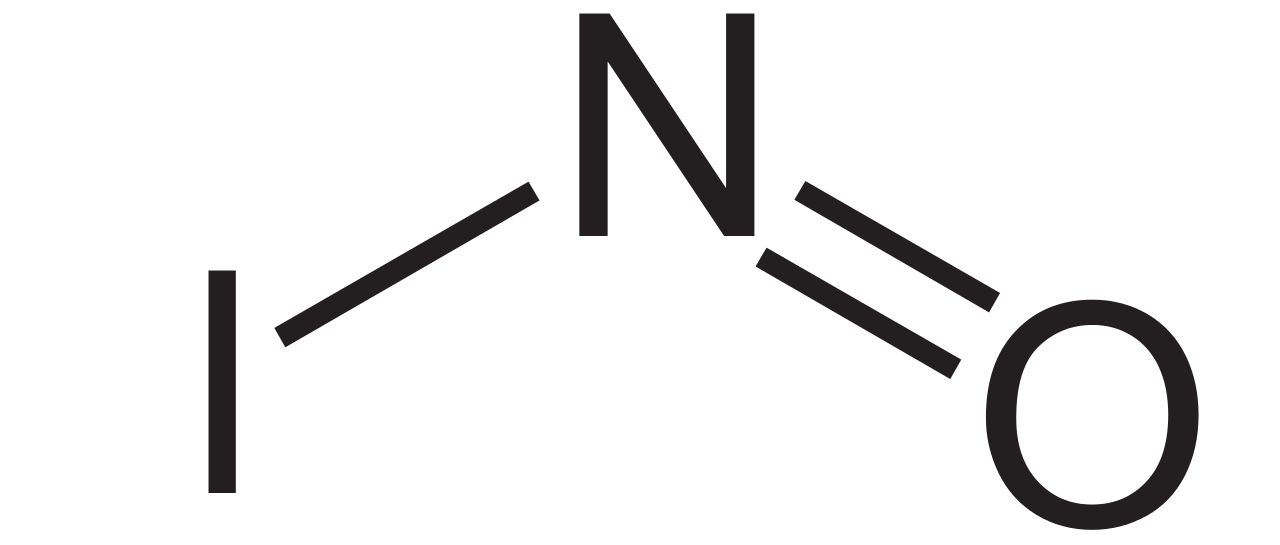
- Skeletal formula of nitrosyl iodide

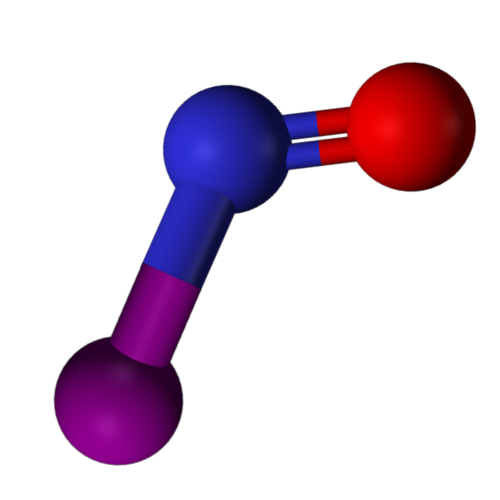
- Ball and stick model of nitrosyl iodide

Names
- IUPAC name Nitrosyl iodide

Identifiers
CAS Number	58585-94-7
3D model (JSmol)	Interactive image
ChemSpider	126649
PubChem CID	143560
CompTox Dashboard (EPA)	DTXSID80207297
- InChI: InChI=1S/INO/c1-2-3 Key: VBAXOVGEFYCYMW-UHFFFAOYSA-N
- SMILES: N(=O)I

Properties
Chemical formula	INO
Molar mass	156.910 g·mol^{−1}
Solubility in water	reacts with water

Hazards
- GHS labelling
Pictograms	(GHS05: Corrosive) (GHS06: Toxic)

Related compounds
Related compounds	Nitroxyl; Nitrosyl chloride; Nitrosyl fluoride; Nitrosyl bromide
- Except where otherwise noted, data are given for materials in their standard state (at 25 °C [77 °F], 100 kPa). Infobox references

Nitrosyl iodide is a chemical compound with the formula INO. Alongside nitryl iodide (INO_{2}), iodine nitrite (IONO), and iodine nitrate (IONO_{2}), it is a member of the INO_{x} (iodine nitrogen oxide) series of compounds, important intermediates and reservoir species in the atmospheric chemistry of iodine.

== Synthesis ==
Nitrosyl iodide is formed in a reaction of nitric oxide with iodine:

2NO + I_{2} → 2NOI

Other methods are also known.

== Physical properties ==
The compound is soluble in organic solvents. It reacts with water.

The compound is unstable and quickly decomposes:

2NOI → 2NO + I_{2}

Nitrosyl iodide is believed to impact tropospheric ozone levels.
