= 6-hydroxyhexanoate dehydrogenase =

Class of enzymes

Identifiers
- EC no.: 1.1.1.258
- CAS no.: 77000-03-4

Databases
- IntEnz: IntEnz view
- BRENDA: BRENDA entry
- ExPASy: NiceZyme view
- KEGG: KEGG entry
- MetaCyc: metabolic pathway
- PRIAM: profile
- PDB structures: RCSB PDB PDBe PDBsum
- Gene Ontology: AmiGO / QuickGO
Search
- PMC: articles
- PubMed: articles
- NCBI: proteins

In enzymology, 6-hydroxyhexanoate dehydrogenase (EC 1.1.1.258) is an enzyme that catalyzes the chemical reaction

6-hydroxyhexanoic acid
+ NAD^{+}
H^{+}
H^{+}
6-oxohexanoic acid
+ NADH

The two substrates of this enzyme are 6-hydroxyhexanoic acid and oxidised nicotinamide adenine dinucleotide (NAD^{+}). Its products are 6-oxohexanoic acid, reduced NADH, and a proton.

This enzyme belongs to the family of oxidoreductases, specifically those acting on the CH-OH group of donor with NAD^{+} or NADP^{+} as acceptor. The systematic name of this enzyme class is 6-hydroxyhexanoate:NAD^{+} oxidoreductase. This enzyme participates in caprolactam degradation.
