= Nitrosylsulfuric acid =

Names
- IUPAC name Nitrosylsulfuric acid
- Other names nitrosonium bisulfate, chamber crystals

Identifiers
CAS Number	7782-78-7
3D model (JSmol)	Interactive image
ChemSpider	74147
ECHA InfoCard	100.029.058
PubChem CID	82157
UNII	40K942UPM8
CompTox Dashboard (EPA)	DTXSID30889380
- InChI: InChI=1S/HNO5S/c2-1-6-7(3,4)5/h(H,3,4,5) Key: VQTGUFBGYOIUFS-UHFFFAOYSA-N; InChI=1/HNO5S/c2-1-6-7(3,4)5/h(H,3,4,5) Key: VQTGUFBGYOIUFS-UHFFFAOYAM
- SMILES: O=NOS(=O)(=O)O

Properties
Chemical formula	NOHSO_{4}
Molar mass	127.08 g/mol
Appearance	Pale yellow crystals
Density	1.865 g/mL in 40% sulfuric acid soln
Melting point	70 °C (158 °F; 343 K)
Boiling point	Decomposes
Solubility in water	Decomposes
Solubility	Soluble in H_{2}SO_{4}

Hazards
- Occupational safety and health (OHS/OSH)
Main hazards	Oxidizer

Related compounds
Other anions	NOCl
Other cations	NaHSO_{4}
Related compounds	NOBF_{4}
- Except where otherwise noted, data are given for materials in their standard state (at 25 °C [77 °F], 100 kPa). verify (what is ?) Infobox references

Nitrosylsulfuric acid is the chemical compound with the formula NOHSO_{4}. It is a colourless solid that is used industrially in the production of caprolactam, and was formerly part of the lead chamber process for producing sulfuric acid. The compound is a salt best described as NO^{+}HSO_{4}^{−} (nitrosonium hydrogensulfate). It is called “lead-chamber crystals”.

In organic chemistry, it is used as a reagent for nitrosating, as a diazotizing agent, and as an oxidizing agent.

== Synthesis and reactions ==
A typical procedure entails dissolving sodium nitrite in cold sulfuric acid:

HNO_{2} + H_{2}SO_{4} → NOHSO_{4} + H_{2}O

It can also be prepared by the reaction of nitric acid and sulfur dioxide.

NOHSO_{4} is used in organic chemistry to prepare diazonium salts from amines, for example in the Sandmeyer reaction. Related NO-delivery reagents include nitrosonium tetrafluoroborate [NO]^{+}[BF_{4}]^{−} and nitrosyl chloride.

In industry, the nitrosodecarboxylation reaction between nitrosylsulfuric acid and cyclohexanecarboxylic acid is used to generate caprolactam: This conversion illustrates the Snia Viscosa process
