= Nitrosyl cyanide =

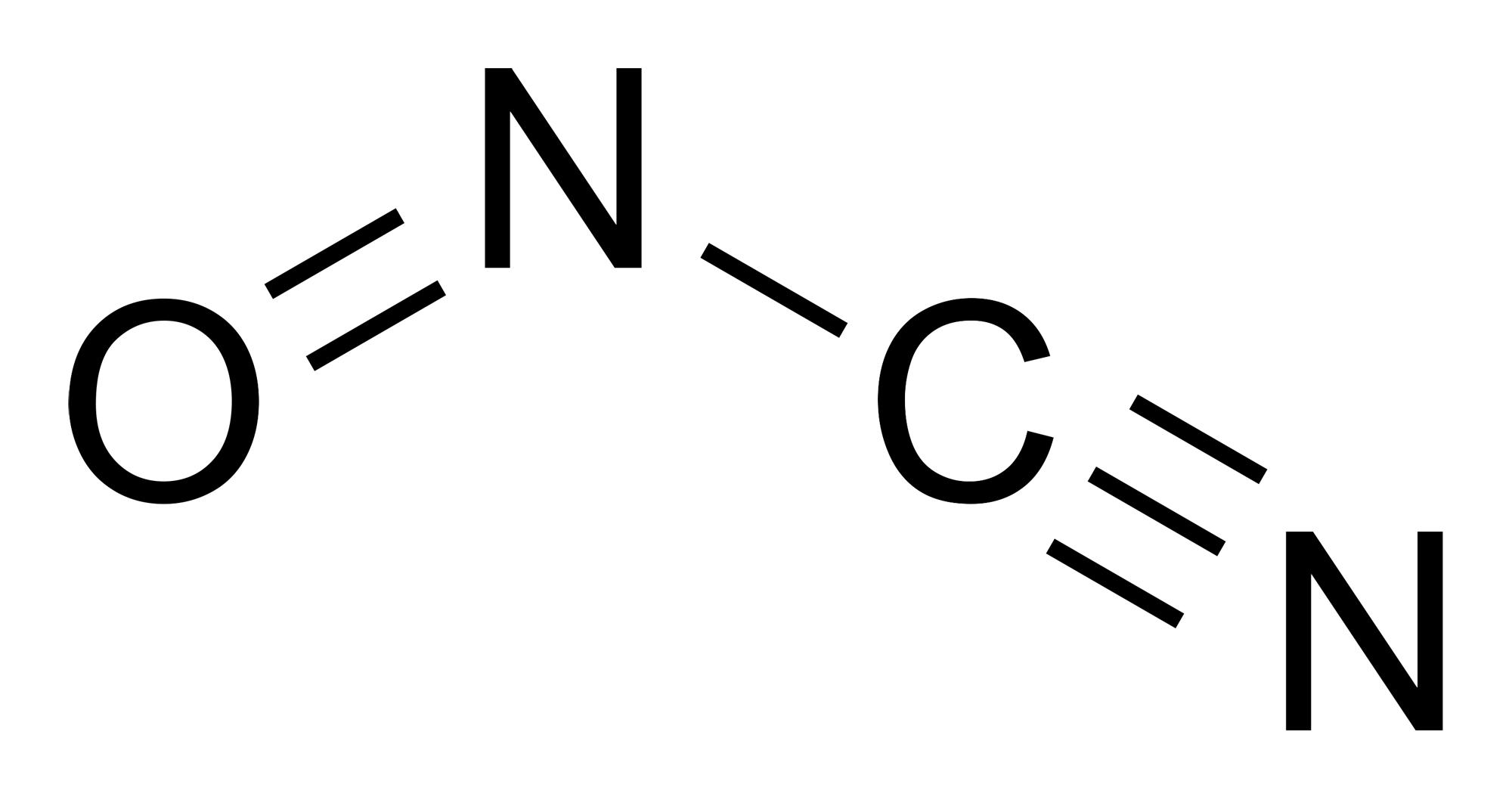

Names
- Preferred IUPAC name Nitrous cyanide

Identifiers
CAS Number	4343-68-4
3D model (JSmol)	Interactive image
ChemSpider	109829
PubChem CID	123214
CompTox Dashboard (EPA)	DTXSID00195849
- InChI: InChI=1S/CN2O/c2-1-3-4 Key: CAMRHYBKQTWSCM-UHFFFAOYSA-N
- SMILES: C(#N)N=O

Properties
Chemical formula	CN_{2}O
Molar mass	56.024 g·mol^{−1}
Appearance	blue-green gas
Boiling point	−40 °C (−40 °F; 233 K)
- Except where otherwise noted, data are given for materials in their standard state (at 25 °C [77 °F], 100 kPa). Infobox references

Nitrosyl cyanide, a blue-green gas, is the compound with the molecular formula ONCN. The compound has been invoked as a product of the oxidation of cyanamide catalyzed by the enzyme glucose oxidase.

== Structure, synthesis, reactivity ==
The structure of nitrosyl cyanide is planar. It is strongly bent at the internal nitrogen, analogous to the structure of nitrosyl chloride. The C-N-O angle is 113°. The NCN angle is 170°.

The compound can be created by the reaction of nitrosyl chloride and silver cyanide at low temperatures. It is not typically isolated, but trapped by Diels-Alder reactions, e.g. with butadiene. Cycloadditions occur across the N=O bond. It forms a reversible adduct with 9,10-dimethylantracene.

== Related compound ==
- Nitryl cyanide (O_{2}NCN), a colorless gas (b.p. 7 °C).
