= C8H14O3 =

The molecular formula C_{8}H_{14}O_{3} may refer to:

- Butyric anhydride
- Isobutyric anhydride
