= Cyclohexyl-isocyanide hydratase =

cyclohexyl-isocyanide hydratase

Identifiers
- EC no.: 4.2.1.103

Databases
- IntEnz: IntEnz view
- BRENDA: BRENDA entry
- ExPASy: NiceZyme view
- KEGG: KEGG entry
- MetaCyc: metabolic pathway
- PRIAM: profile
- PDB structures: RCSB PDB PDBe PDBsum
- Gene Ontology: AmiGO / QuickGO
Search
- PMC: articles
- PubMed: articles
- NCBI: proteins

The enzyme cyclohexyl-isocyanide hydratase (EC 4.2.1.103) catalyzes the chemical reaction

N-cyclohexylformamide $\rightleftharpoons$ cyclohexyl isocyanide + H_{2}O

This enzyme belongs to the family of lyases, specifically the hydro-lyases, which cleave carbon-oxygen bonds. The systematic name of this enzyme class is N-cyclohexylformamide hydro-lyase (cyclohexyl-isocyanide-forming). Other names in common use include isonitrile hydratase, and N-cyclohexylformamide hydro-lyase. This enzyme participates in caprolactam degradation.
