= Lead chamber process =

Industrial process

The lead chamber process was an industrial method used to produce sulfuric acid in large quantities. It has been largely supplanted by the contact process.

In 1746 in Birmingham, England, John Roebuck began producing sulfuric acid in lead-lined chambers, which were stronger and less expensive and could be made much larger than the glass containers that had been used previously. This allowed the effective industrialization of sulfuric acid production, and with several refinements, this process remained the standard method of production for almost two centuries. The process was so robust that as late as 1946, the chamber process still accounted for 25% of sulfuric acid manufactured.

== History ==
Sulfur dioxide is introduced with steam and nitrogen dioxide into large chambers lined with sheet lead where the gases are sprayed down with water and chamber acid (62–70% sulfuric acid). The sulfur dioxide and nitrogen dioxide dissolve, and over a period of approximately 30 minutes the sulfur dioxide is oxidized to sulfuric acid. The presence of nitrogen dioxide is necessary for the reaction to proceed at a reasonable rate. The process is highly exothermic, and a major consideration of the design of the chambers was to provide a way to dissipate the heat formed in the reactions.

Early plants used very large lead-lined wooden rectangular chambers (Faulding box chambers) that were cooled by ambient air. The internal lead sheathing served to contain the corrosive sulfuric acid and to render the wooden chambers waterproof.

In the 1820s-1830s, French chemist Joseph Louis Gay-Lussac (simultaneously and likely in collaboration with William Gossage) realized that it is not the bulk of liquid determining the speed of reaction but the internal area of the chamber, so he redesigned the chambers as stoneware packed masonry cylinders, which was an early example of the packed bed.

In the 20th century, plants using Mills-Packard chambers supplanted the earlier designs. These chambers were tall tapered cylinders that were externally cooled by water flowing down the outside surface of the chamber.

Sulfur dioxide for the process was provided by burning elemental sulfur or by the roasting of sulfur-containing metal ores in a stream of air in a furnace. During the early period of manufacture, nitrogen oxides were produced by the decomposition of niter at high temperature in the presence of acid, but this process was gradually supplanted by the air oxidation of ammonia to nitric oxide in the presence of a catalyst. The recovery and reuse of oxides of nitrogen was an important economic consideration in the operation of a chamber process plant.

In the reaction chambers, nitric oxide reacts with oxygen to produce nitrogen dioxide. Liquid from the bottom of the chambers is diluted and pumped to the top of the chamber, and sprayed downward in a fine mist. Sulfur dioxide and nitrogen dioxide are absorbed in the liquid, and react to form sulfuric acid and nitric oxide. The liberated nitric oxide is sparingly soluble in water, and returns to the gas in the chamber where it reacts with oxygen in the air to reform nitrogen dioxide. Some percentage of the nitrogen oxides is sequestered in the reaction liquor as nitrosylsulfuric acid and as nitric acid, so fresh nitric oxide must be added as the process proceeds. Later versions of chamber plants included a high-temperature Glover tower to recover the nitrogen oxides from the chamber liquor, while concentrating the chamber acid to as much as 78% H_{2}SO_{4}. Exhaust gases from the chambers are scrubbed by passing them into a tower, through which some of the Glover acid flows over broken tile. Nitrogen oxides are absorbed to form nitrosylsulfuric acid, which is then returned to the Glover tower to reclaim the oxides of nitrogen.

Sulfuric acid produced in the reaction chambers is limited to about 35% concentration. At higher concentrations, nitrosylsulfuric acid precipitates upon the lead walls in the form of 'chamber crystals', and is no longer able to catalyze the oxidation reactions.

== Chemistry ==
The process hinges on the oxidation of sulfur dioxide by aqueous nitrosylsulfuric acid, yielding nitric oxide (the catalyst) and sulfuric acid:

2 NOHSO_{4} + SO_{2} + H_{2}O → 3 H_{2}SO_{4} + 2NO

Nitric oxide is reoxidized by air to nitrogen dioxide:

2NO + O_{2} → 2 NO_{2}

Nitric oxide combines with nitrogen dioxide:

NO + NO_{2} ⇌ N_{2}O_{3}

The resulting dinitrogen trioxide reacts with sulfuric acid to regenerate nitrosylsulfuric acid:

N_{2}O_{3} + 2 H_{2}SO_{4} → 2 NOHSO_{4} + H_{2}O
