= Fluorine nitrate =

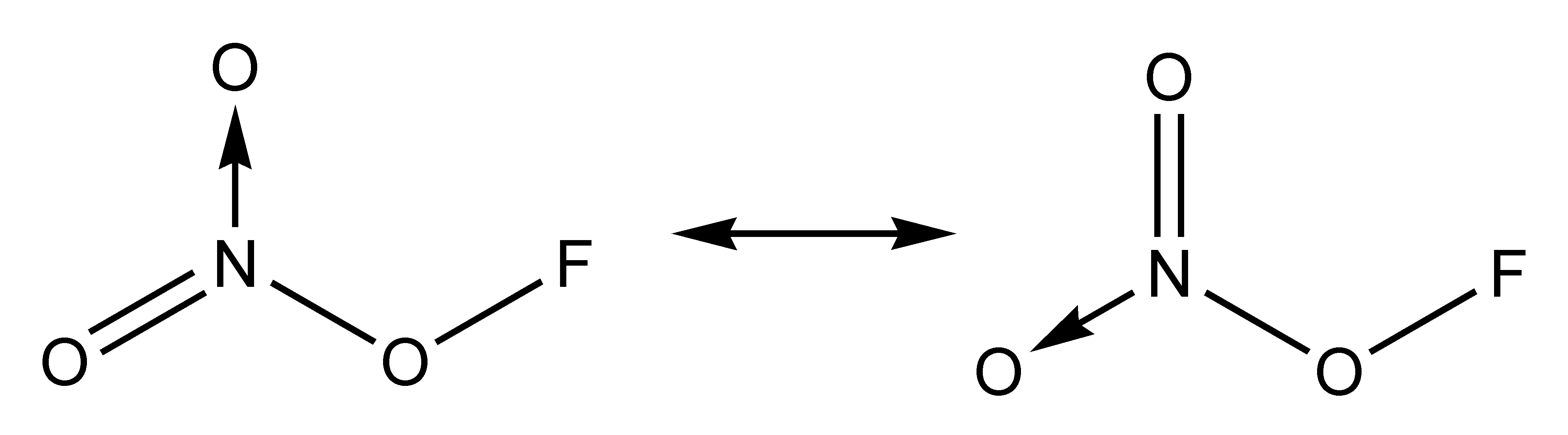

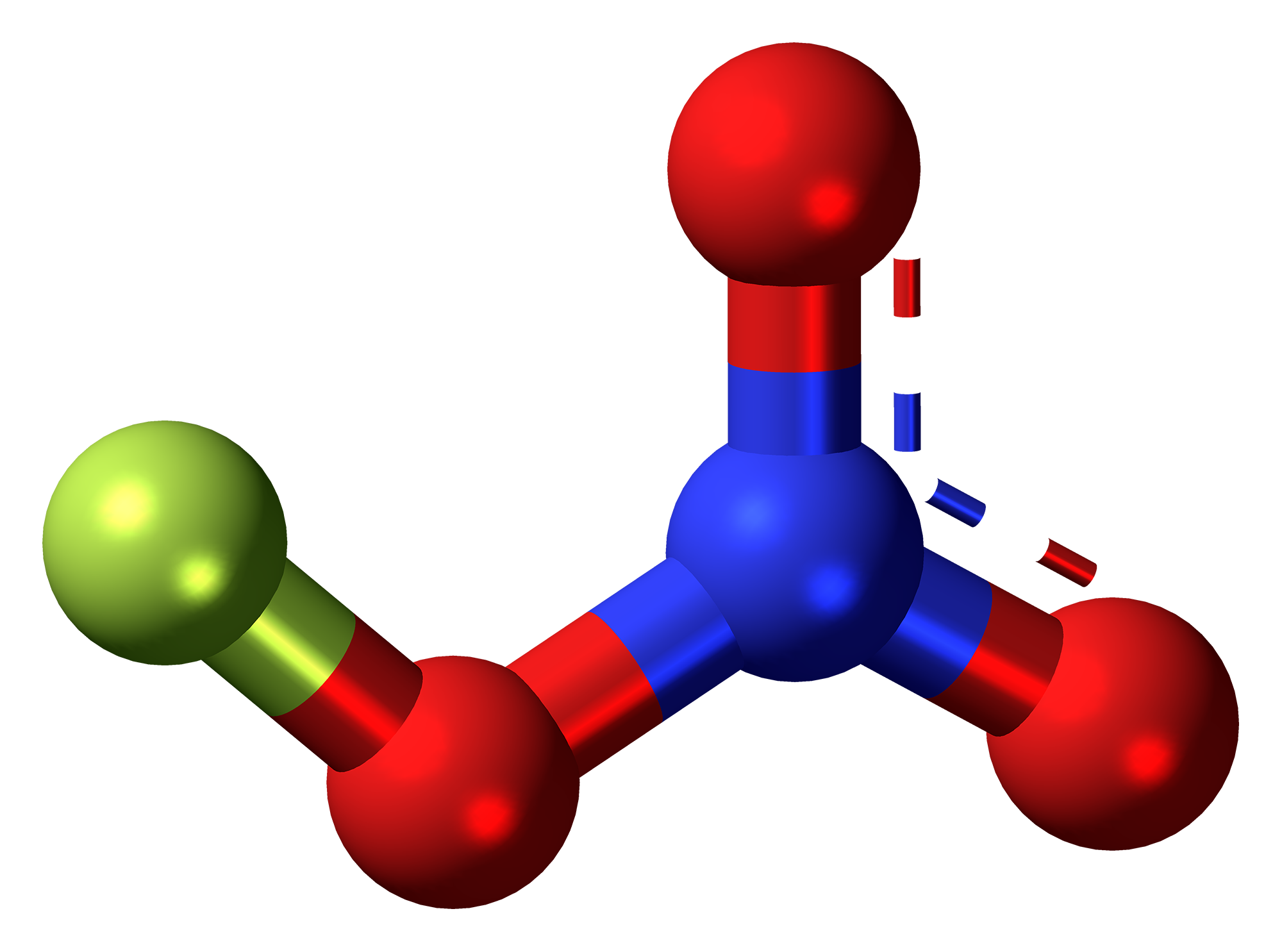

Names
- Other names Nitryl hypofluorite

Identifiers
CAS Number	7789-26-6
3D model (JSmol)	Interactive image
ChemSpider	109875
PubChem CID	123262
UNII	1Q6BYH7F2B
CompTox Dashboard (EPA)	DTXSID20228502
- InChI: InChI=1S/FNO3/c1-5-2(3)4 Key: VHFBTKQOIBRGQP-UHFFFAOYSA-N
- SMILES: FO[N+](=O)[O-]

Properties
Chemical formula	FNO_{3}
Molar mass	81.002 g·mol^{−1}
Density	2.217 g/L
Melting point	−175 °C (−283.0 °F; 98.1 K)
Boiling point	−46 °C (−51 °F; 227 K)

Thermochemistry
Std enthalpy of formation (Δ_{f}H^{⦵}_{298})	+10.46 kJ/mol

Hazards
- Occupational safety and health (OHS/OSH)
Main hazards	Explosive gas
- Except where otherwise noted, data are given for materials in their standard state (at 25 °C [77 °F], 100 kPa). verify (what is ?) Infobox references

Fluorine nitrate is an unstable derivative of nitric acid with the formula FNO_{3}. It is shock-sensitive. Due to its instability, it is often produced from chlorine nitrate as needed. Fluorine nitrate is an inert molecule thought to play a significant role in atmospheric chemistry.

== History ==
In 1935, professor George H. Cady was first to synthesize fluorine nitrate and has since maintained a long and controversial history. In 1937, American chemist and biochemist Linus Pauling and one of his first graduate students, Lawrence O. Brockway, utilized electron diffraction intensities to determine the structure of the oxygen and fluorine bond perpendicular to the NO_{2} plane to be a non-planar structure. This would later be confirmed in 1963 and 1966 utilizing infrared spectra.

In a 1995 study performed by Universität Tubingen in Germany, found through electron diffraction that the nitrogen–oxygen bond is surprisingly long at about a length of 150.7 ppm. This length is likely the result of the presence of electronegative atoms compared to other similar structures such as nitric acid.

== Synthesis and properties ==
Whilst not fully understood, it is thought that FNO_{3} forms as a result of termolecular recombination of FO and NO_{2} radicals. Fluorine nitrate is prepared through the agitation of fluorine in its gaseous form, which will bubble through nitric acid or solid KNO_{3}. Due to the shock sensitive nature of the compound, it is necessary to handle it with extreme caution:

F_{2} + HNO_{3} → FNO_{3} + HF

F_{2} + KNO_{3} → FNO_{3} + KF

It decomposes in water to form oxygen gas, oxygen difluoride, hydrofluoric acid, and nitric acid.

In fluorine nitrate, the oxygen atom bridging nitrogen and fluorine is in a rare oxidation state of 0 due to its electronegativity being lower than that of fluorine but higher than that of nitrogen. The role of electronegativity also is significant in the structure of fluorine nitrate. Through electron diffraction analysis, FNO_{3} was determined to have a planar structure with a particularly long nitrogen-oxygen bond length.

Fluorine nitrate has been linked to higher ionization potential due to the centrality of fluorine. This higher ionization potential is indicative of electron ionization of deeper shell orbitals.

== Applications ==
Since the 1990s, fluorine nitrate has been studied as a critical factor of atmospheric chemistry. It was in this period that fluorine nitrate began to be labeled as a reservoir species in the atmosphere.

The relationship between the ionization potential and the highest occupied molecular orbital (HOMO) in fluorine nitrate was determined to be large. In a 1996 study, researchers asserted that the ionization potential of the HOMO in a molecule is a reflection of the electron-donating capacities of a molecule and as the ionization potential of the HOMO is lowered, subsequently the electron donating capacities of the molecule increase and become stronger.

Despite the molecule’s inert nature, it is asserted by the 1996 study that fluorine nitrate may be the best possible reservoir species in the process of ozone depletion.
