= Bromine nitrate =

Names
- Other names Bromine mononitrate, bromo nitrate

Identifiers
CAS Number	40423-14-1
3D model (JSmol)	Interactive image
ChemSpider	110090
PubChem CID	123495
CompTox Dashboard (EPA)	DTXSID90960821
- InChI: InChI=1S/BrNO3/c1-5-2(3)4 Key: RRTWEEAEXPZMPY-UHFFFAOYSA-N
- SMILES: [N+](=O)([O-])OBr

Properties
Chemical formula	BrNO_{3}
Molar mass	141.91 g/mol
Appearance	Yellow liquid
Melting point	−42 °C (−44 °F; 231 K)
Boiling point	0 °C (32 °F; 273 K)
- Except where otherwise noted, data are given for materials in their standard state (at 25 °C [77 °F], 100 kPa). Infobox references

Bromine mononitrate is an inorganic compound, derived from bromine and nitric acid with the chemical formula BrNO_{3}. The compound is a yellow liquid that decomposes at temperatures above 0 °C.

This compounds is extremely reactive due to its intrinsic instability, which makes handling and synthesis challenging. Because of its explosive potential and corrosive character, this substance is mostly used for study in restricted laboratory settings. About its particular characteristics and uses outside of its use as a chemical research subject, not much is known.

== Synthesis ==
Bromine nitrate can be prepared by several methods:

1. Reaction of silver nitrate on an alcoholic solution of bromine:

Br_{2} + AgNO_{3} → BrNO_{3} + AgBr

2. Reaction of bromine chloride with chlorine nitrate at low temperatures:

BrCl + ClNO_{3} → BrNO_{3} + Cl_{2}

== Physical properties ==
Bromine mononitrate forms an unstable yellow liquid that decomposes at temperatures above 0 °C.

The molecule has the structure BrONO_{2}.

The compound is easily soluble in trichlorofluoromethane and carbon tetrachloride.

== Applications ==
Bromine nitrate plays a role in tropospheric chemistry as it reacts with sulfuric acid.
