= Trinitrotriazine =

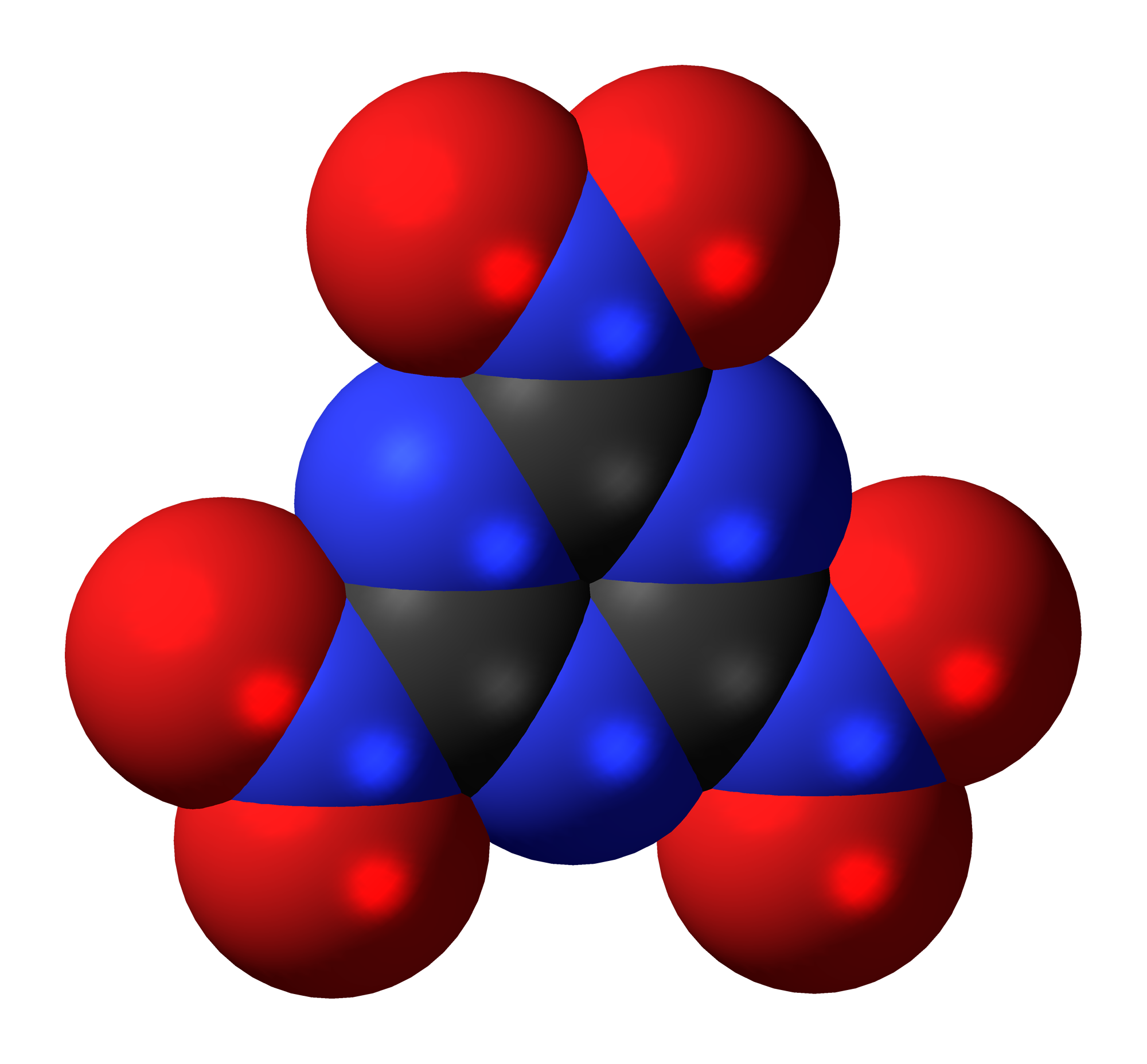

Names
- Preferred IUPAC name 2,4,6-Trinitro-1,3,5-triazine

Identifiers
CAS Number	140218-59-3
3D model (JSmol)	Interactive image
ChemSpider	15188373
PubChem CID	21997109
CompTox Dashboard (EPA)	DTXSID10621341
- InChI: InChI=1S/C3N6O6/c10-7(11)1-2(8(12)13)4-6-5-3(1)9(14)15 Key: QHHATGLDAJAQBL-UHFFFAOYSA-N
- SMILES: O=[N+]([O-])C1=NC([N+]([O-])=O)=NC([N+]([O-])=O)=N1

Properties
Chemical formula	C_{3}N_{6}O_{6}
Molar mass	216.069 g·mol^{−1}
- Except where otherwise noted, data are given for materials in their standard state (at 25 °C [77 °F], 100 kPa). verify (what is ?) Infobox references

Trinitrotriazine, or 2,4,6-trinitro-1,3,5-triazine, is a theoretical explosive compound. Synthesis of this compound has been elusive despite its simple structure, as conventional nitration of triazine becomes increasingly more difficult as more nitro groups are added. A successful route would more likely proceed by trimerisation of nitryl cyanide. The precursor nitryl cyanide was first synthesized by Rahm et al. in 2014.

Trinitrotriazine has a neutral oxygen balance, potentially making it a very powerful explosive, though calculations predict it would be fairly unstable and inferior to the related compound 3,6-dinitro-1,2,4,5-tetrazine.

== See also ==
- RDX (hexahydro-1,3,5-trinitro-1,3,5-triazine)
