= Isobutyric anhydride =

Names
- IUPAC name 2-Methylpropanoic anhydride
- Other names: Isobutyric acid anhydride

Identifiers
CAS Number	97-72-3
3D model (JSmol)	Interactive image
ChEBI	CHEBI:84261
ChEMBL	ChEMBL1871691
ChemSpider	7069
ECHA InfoCard	100.002.367
EC Number	202-603-6
PubChem CID	7346
UNII	N85A80FJDT
UN number	2924 2530
CompTox Dashboard (EPA)	DTXSID7026609
- InChI: InChI=1S/C8H14O3/c1-5(2)7(9)11-8(10)6(3)4/h5-6H,1-4H3 Key: LSACYLWPPQLVSM-UHFFFAOYSA-N
- SMILES: CC(C)C(=O)OC(=O)C(C)C

Properties
Chemical formula	C_{8}H_{14}O_{3}
Molar mass	158.197 g·mol^{−1}
Appearance	Colorless liquid
Density	0.9535 g/cm³ (at 20 °C)
Melting point	−53.5 °C (−64.3 °F; 219.7 K)
Boiling point	181.5 °C (358.7 °F; 454.6 K)
Vapor pressure	0.5 mmHg
- Except where otherwise noted, data are given for materials in their standard state (at 25 °C [77 °F], 100 kPa). Infobox references

Isobutyric anhydride is an organic compound with the formula ((CH_{3})_{2}CHCO)_{2}O. It is an acyclic carboxylic anhydride of isobutyric acid. It is classified as an organic acid anhydride, being derived from dehydration of isobutyric acid. It is a colorless liquid with a strong, pungent odor.

Isobutyric anhydride is a reagent in the production of the ester of cyclohexanone oxime.

== Applications ==
Isobutyric anhydride is used as an acylating agent in organic synthesis. Its primary application is in the production of esters, from various starting materials such as cyclohexanone oxime. Isobutyric anhydride is used in the synthesis of various dyes. It is also used in the production of cellulose derivatives, such as cellulose isobutyrate and cellulose acetate isobutyrate. Another application of isobutyric anhydride is in the synthesis of various chemical derivatives. For example, it is used to produce 4-O-isobutyryl derivatives of monosaccharides.
