= Nitrosonium =

Diatomic cation

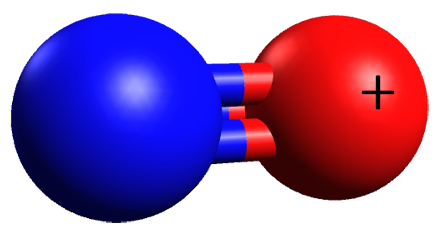

Names
- IUPAC name Nitrilooxonium
- Systematic IUPAC name Oxidonitrogen(1+)
- Other names Nitrosonium; Iminooxidanium

Identifiers
CAS Number	14452-93-8
3D model (JSmol)	Interactive image
Abbreviations	NO(+)
ChEBI	CHEBI:29120
ChemSpider	76569
Gmelin Reference	456
PubChem CID	84878
CompTox Dashboard (EPA)	DTXSID901027026 DTXSID90932326, DTXSID901027026
- InChI: InChI=1S/NO/c1-2/q+1 Key: KEJOCWOXCDWNID-UHFFFAOYSA-N
- SMILES: N#[O+]
- Except where otherwise noted, data are given for materials in their standard state (at 25 °C [77 °F], 100 kPa). Infobox references

The nitrosonium ion is NO^{+}, in which the nitrogen atom is bonded to an oxygen atom with a bond order of 3, and the overall diatomic species is cationic, bearing a positive charge. It can be viewed as nitric oxide with one electron removed. This ion is usually obtained as the following salts: NOClO_{4}, NOSO_{4}H (nitrosylsulfuric acid, more descriptively written NOSO_{3}OH) and NOBF_{4}. The ClO^{−}_{4} and BF^{−}_{4} salts are slightly soluble in acetonitrile CH_{3}CN. NOBF_{4} can be purified by sublimation at 200–250 °C and 0.01 mmHg (1.3 Pa).

== Synthesis and spectroscopy ==
NO^{+} is isoelectronic with CO, CN^{−} and N_{2}. It arises via protonation of nitrous acid:

HONO + H^{+} ⇌ NO^{+} + H_{2}O

In its infrared spectrum of its salts, ν_{NO} is a strong peak in the range 2150–2400 cm^{−1}, indicating it is a loose cation rather than coordinated to another species.

== Chemical properties ==
=== Hydrolysis ===
NO^{+} reacts readily with water to form nitrous acid:

NO^{+} + H_{2}O → HONO + H^{+}

For this reason, nitrosonium compounds must be protected from water or even moist air. With base, the reaction generates nitrite:

NO^{+} + 2 NaOH → NaNO_{2} + Na^{+} + H_{2}O

=== As a diazotizing agent ===
NO^{+} reacts with aryl amines, ArNH_{2}, to give diazonium salts, ArN^{+}_{2}. The resulting diazonium group is easily displaced (unlike the amino group) by a variety of nucleophiles.

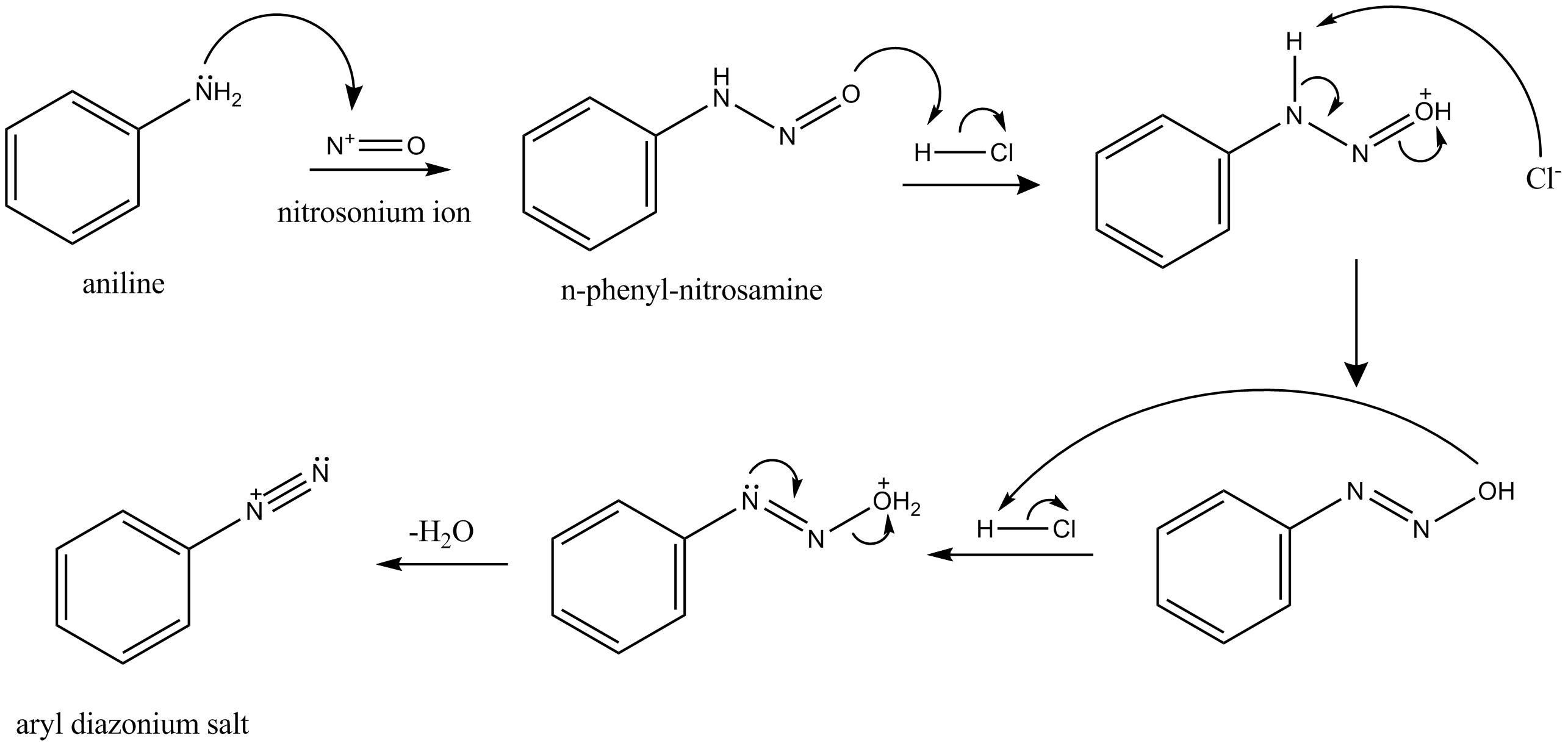
Reaction of nitrosonium with aniline to form a diazonium salt

=== As an oxidizing agent ===
NO^{+}, e.g. as NOBF_{4}, is a strong oxidizing agent:

- vs. ferrocene/ferrocenium, [NO]^{+} in CH_{2}Cl_{2} solution has a redox potential of 1.00 V (or 1.46–1.48 V vs SCE),
- vs. ferrocene/ferrocenium, [NO]^{+} in CH_{3}CN solution has a redox potential of 0.87 V vs. (or 1.27–1.25 V vs SCE).

In organic chemistry, it selectively cleaves ethers and oximes, and couples diarylamines.

NOBF_{4} is a convenient oxidant because the byproduct NO is a gas, which can be swept from the reaction using a stream of N_{2}. Upon contact with air, NO forms NO_{2}, which can cause secondary reactions if it is not removed. NO_{2} is readily detectable by its characteristic orange color.

=== Nitrosylation of arenes ===
Electron-rich arenes are nitrosylated using NOBF_{4}. One example involves anisole:

CH_{3}OC_{6}H_{5} + NOBF_{4} → CH_{3}OC_{6}H_{4}NO + HBF_{4}

Nitrosonium, NO^{+}, is sometimes confused with nitronium, NO^{+}_{2}, the active agent in nitrations. These species are quite different, however. Nitronium is a more potent electrophile than is nitrosonium, as anticipated by the fact that the former is derived from a strong acid (nitric acid) and the latter from a weak acid (nitrous acid).

=== As a source of nitrosyl complexes ===
NOBF_{4} reacts with some metal carbonyl complexes to yield related metal nitrosyl complexes. In some cases, [NO]^{+} does not bind the metal nucleophile but acts as an oxidant.

(C_{6}Et_{6})Cr(CO)_{3} + NOBF_{4} → [(C_{6}Et_{6})Cr(CO)_{2}(NO)]BF_{4} + CO

== See also ==
- Nitronium (NO_{2}^{+})
- Nitric oxide (NO)
