= Nitryl cyanide =

Names
- IUPAC name Nitroformonitrile
- Other names Nitric cyanide

Identifiers
CAS Number	105879-05-8
3D model (JSmol)	Interactive image
PubChem CID	15798559
- InChI: InChI=1S/CN2O2/c2-1-3(4)5 Key: PLXPTFQGYWXIEA-UHFFFAOYSA-N
- SMILES: [O-][N+](=O)C#N

Properties
Chemical formula	CN_{2}O_{2}
Molar mass	72.023 g·mol^{−1}
Appearance	Colourless liquid
Density	1.24 g ml^{−1} (−79 °C)
Melting point	−85 °C (−121 °F; 188 K)
Boiling point	7 °C (45 °F; 280 K)
Solubility in water	Reacts with water

Thermochemistry
Std enthalpy of formation (Δ_{f}H^{⦵}_{298})	212 kJ mol^{−1}

Related compounds
Related compounds	Nitrile isocyanide (CNNO_{2})
- Except where otherwise noted, data are given for materials in their standard state (at 25 °C [77 °F], 100 kPa). Infobox references

Nitryl cyanide is an energetic chemical compound with the formula NCNO_{2}. Nitryl cyanide is a possible precursor to the theoretical explosive 2,4,6-trinitro-1,3,5-triazine.

== Synthesis ==
Nitryl cyanide was first synthesized in 2014. The reaction of nitronium tetrafluoroborate with tert-butyldimethylsilyl cyanide at −30 °C produces nitryl cyanide, with tert-butyldimethylsilyl fluoride and boron trifluoride as byproducts.

NO_{2}BF_{4} + t−BuMe_{2}SiCN → NCNO_{2} + t−BuMe_{2}SiF + BF_{3}

The conversion of this method is only 50%, and using an excess of tert-butyldimethylsilyl causes the yield to drop even further.
