= Nitrosonium tetrafluoroborate =

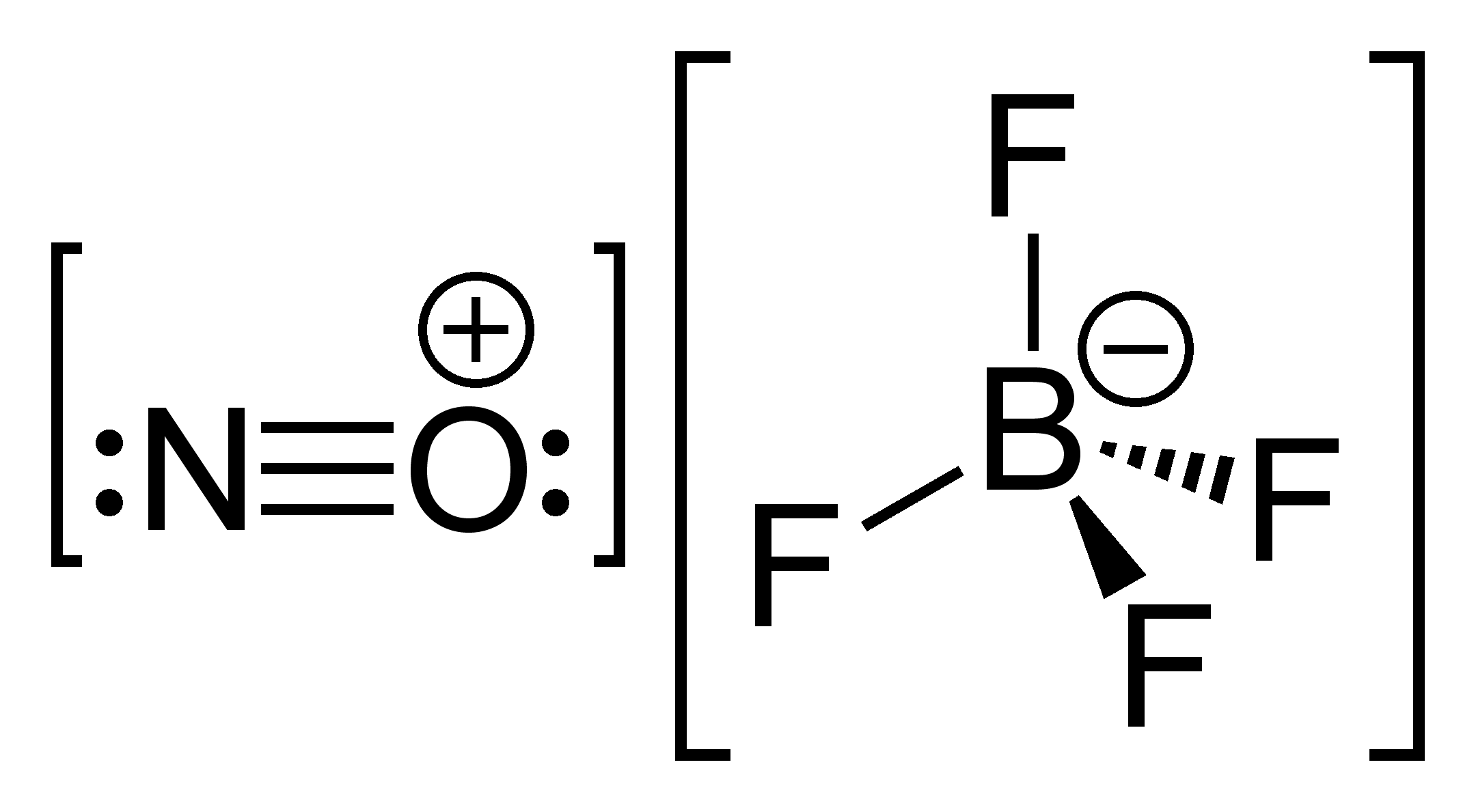

Names
- IUPAC name nitrosonium tetrafluoroborate
- Other names nitrosyl tetrafluoroborate

Identifiers
CAS Number	14635-75-7
3D model (JSmol)	Interactive image
ChemSpider	9312255
ECHA InfoCard	100.035.148
PubChem CID	151929
UNII	B99S282SUJ
CompTox Dashboard (EPA)	DTXSID101015532
- InChI: InChI=1S/BF4.NO/c2-1(3,4)5;1-2/q-1;+1 Key: KGCNVGDHOSFKFT-UHFFFAOYSA-N
- SMILES: [B-](F)(F)(F)F.N#[O+]

Properties
Chemical formula	NOBF_{4}
Molar mass	116.81 g·mol^{−1}
Appearance	colourless crystalline solid
Density	2.185 g⋅cm^{−3}
Melting point	250 °C (482 °F; 523 K) (sublimes)
Solubility in water	decomposes
- Except where otherwise noted, data are given for materials in their standard state (at 25 °C [77 °F], 100 kPa). verify (what is ?) Infobox references

Nitrosonium tetrafluoroborate, also called nitrosyl tetrafluoroborate, is a chemical compound with the chemical formula NOBF_{4}. This colourless solid is used in organic synthesis as a nitrosating agent, diazotizing agent and a mild oxidant.

NOBF_{4} is the nitrosonium salt of fluoroboric acid, and is composed of a nitrosonium cation, [NO]^{+}, and a tetrafluoroborate anion, [BF_{4}]^{−}.

== Reactions ==
The dominant property of NOBF_{4} is the oxidizing power and electrophilic character of the nitrosonium cation. It forms colored charge transfer complexes with hexamethylbenzene and with 18-crown-6. The latter, a deep yellow species, provides a means to dissolve NOBF_{4} in dichloromethane.

Nitrosonium tetrafluoroborate may be used to prepare metal salts of the type [M^{II}(CH_{3}CN)_{x}][BF_{4}]_{2} (M = Cr, Mn, Fe, Co, Ni, Cu). The nitrosonium cation acts as the oxidizer, itself being reduced to nitric oxide gas:

M + 2 NOBF_{4} + xCH_{3}CN → [M(CH_{3}CN)_{x}](BF_{4})_{2} + 2 NO

With ferrocene the ferrocenium tetrafluoroborate is formed.

In its infrared spectrum of this salt, ν_{NO} shows a strong peak at 2387 cm^{−1}.
