= Cyclohexanone oxime =

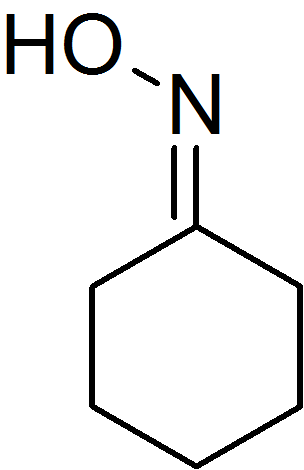

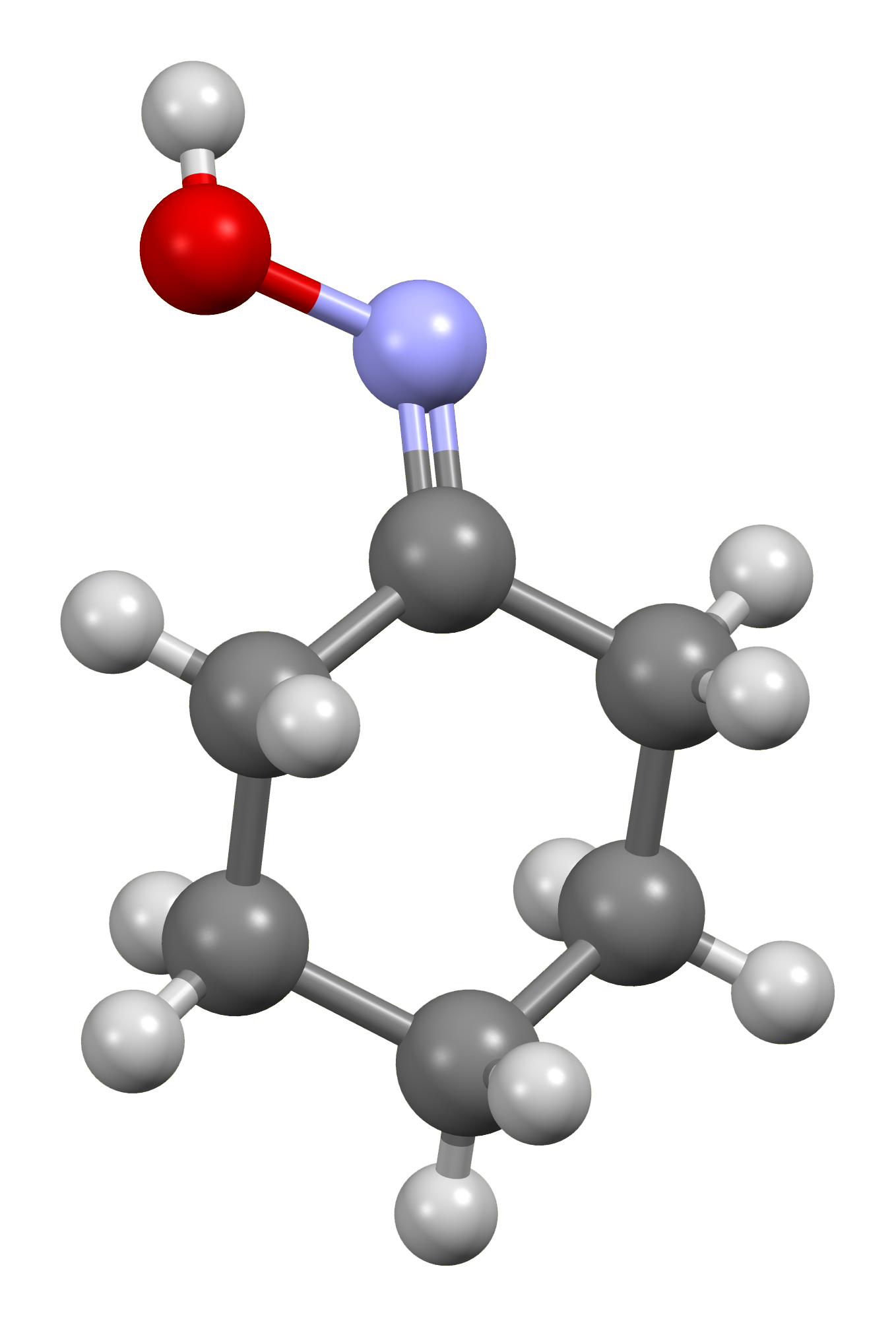

Names
- Preferred IUPAC name N-Hydroxycyclohexanimine

Identifiers
CAS Number	100-64-1
3D model (JSmol)	Interactive image
ChEMBL	ChEMBL137035
ChemSpider	7236
ECHA InfoCard	100.002.613
EC Number	202-874-0
PubChem CID	7517
UNII	2U60L00CGF
UN number	2811
CompTox Dashboard (EPA)	DTXSID4021842
- InChI: InChI=1S/C6H11NO/c8-7-6-4-2-1-3-5-6/h8H,1-5H2 Key: VEZUQRBDRNJBJY-UHFFFAOYSA-N; InChI=1/C6H11NO/c8-7-6-4-2-1-3-5-6/h8H,1-5H2 Key: VEZUQRBDRNJBJY-UHFFFAOYAH
- SMILES: C1CCC(=NO)CC1

Properties
Chemical formula	C_{6}H_{11}NO
Molar mass	113.16 g/mol
Appearance	white solid
Melting point	88 to 91 °C (190 to 196 °F; 361 to 364 K)
Boiling point	204 to 206 °C (399 to 403 °F; 477 to 479 K)
Solubility in water	16 g/kg (in water)
Magnetic susceptibility (χ)	−71.52·10^{−6} cm^{3}/mol

Hazards
- GHS labelling
Pictograms	(GHS02: Flammable) (GHS07: Exclamation mark) (GHS08: Health hazard)
Signal word	Warning
Hazard statements	H228, H302, H319, H373, H412
Precautionary statements	P210, P240, P241, P260, P264, P270, P273, P280, P301+P312, P305+P351+P338, P314, P330, P337+P313, P370+P378, P501
Flash point	110 °C (230 °F; 383 K)
- Except where otherwise noted, data are given for materials in their standard state (at 25 °C [77 °F], 100 kPa). Infobox references

Cyclohexanone oxime is an organic compound containing the functional group oxime. This colorless solid is an important intermediate in the production of nylon 6, a widely used polymer.

== Preparation ==
Cyclohexanone oxime can be prepared from the condensation reaction between cyclohexanone and hydroxylamine:

(CH_{2})_{5}CO + H_{2}NOH → (CH_{2})_{5}C=NOH + H_{2}O

Alternatively, another industrial route involves the reaction of cyclohexane with nitrosyl chloride, which is a free-radical reaction. This method is advantageous as cyclohexane is much cheaper than cyclohexanone.

== Reactions ==
The most famous and commercially important reaction of cyclohexanone oxime is Beckmann rearrangement yielding ε-caprolactam, which is used to produce Nylon 6:

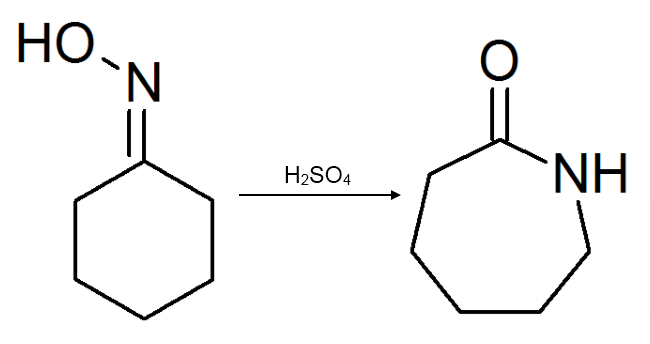

This reaction is catalyzed by sulfuric acid, but industrial scale reactions use solid acids.

Typical of oximes, the compound can be reduced by sodium amalgam to produce cyclohexylamine. It can also be hydrolyzed with acetic acid to give back cyclohexanone.
