= Chlorine nitrate =

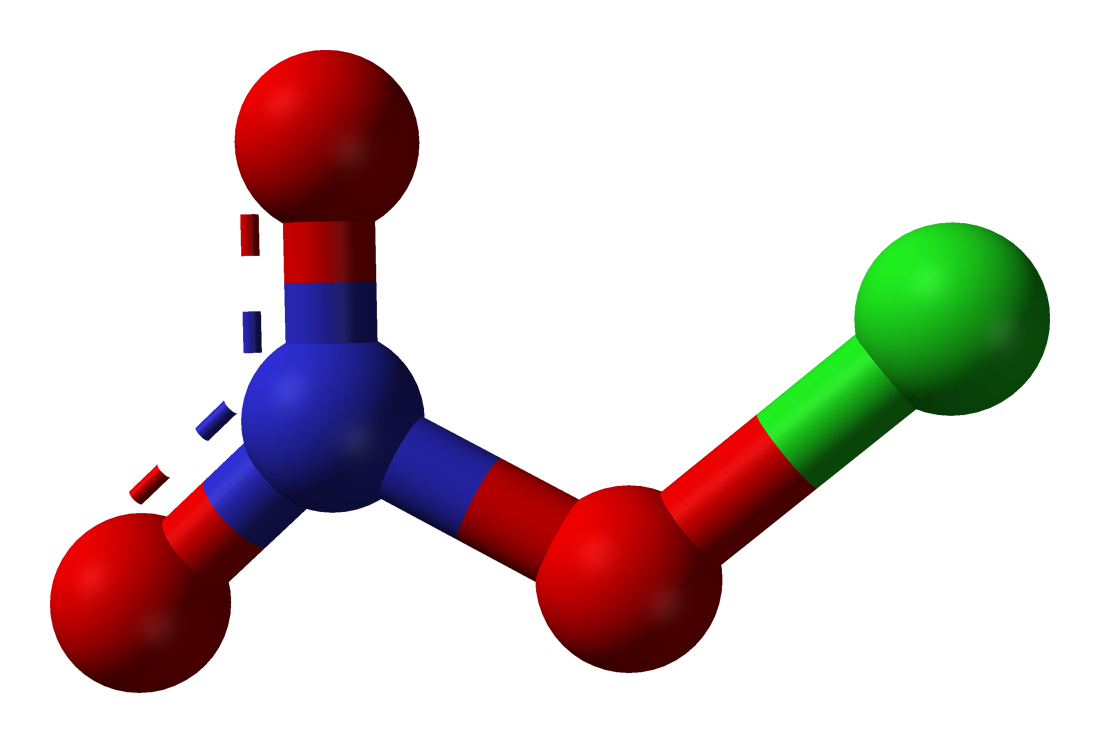
Ball and stick model of chlorine nitrate
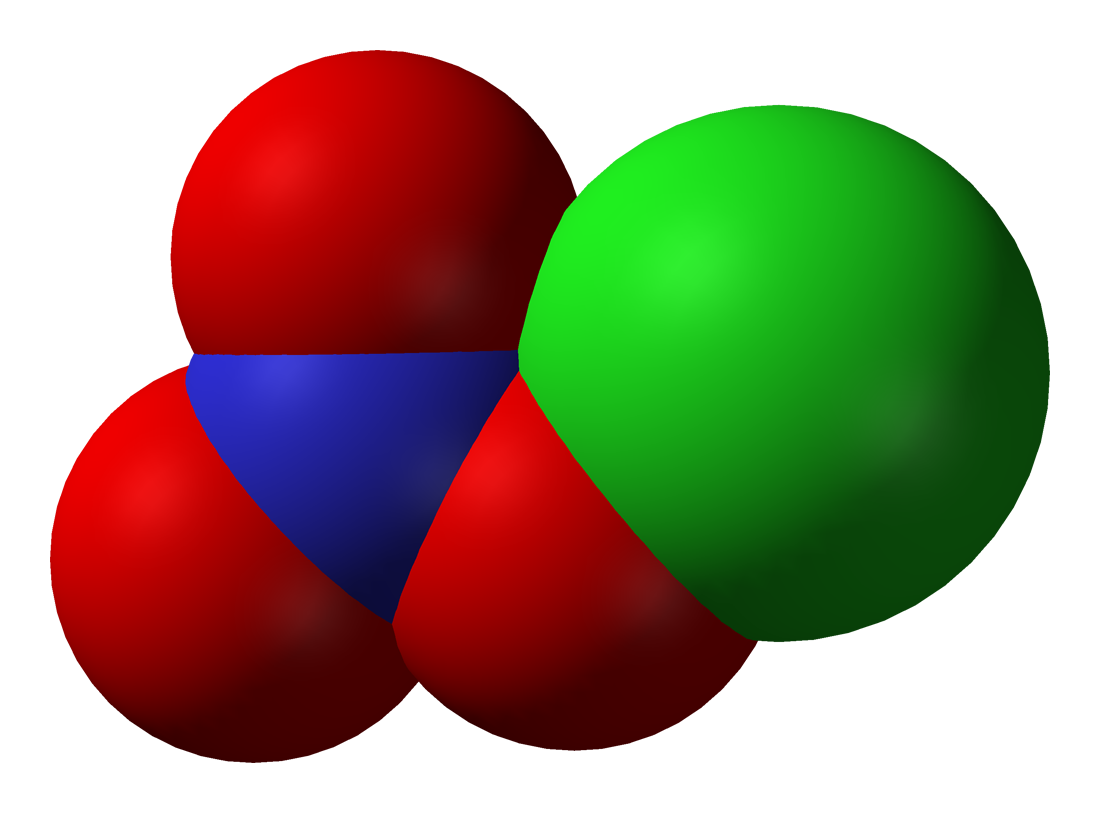
Spacefill model of chlorine nitrate
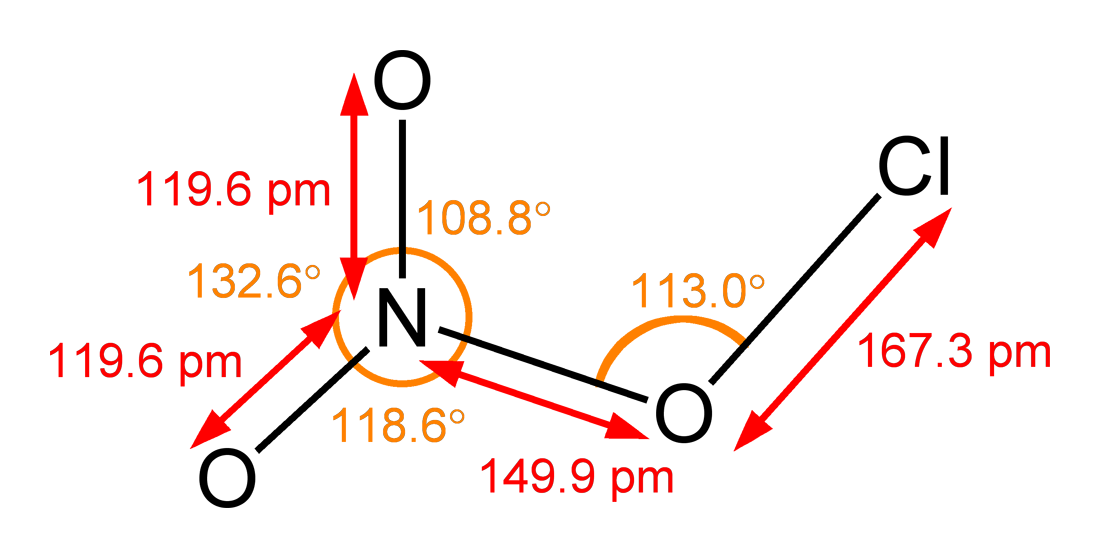
- Stick model of chlorine nitrate

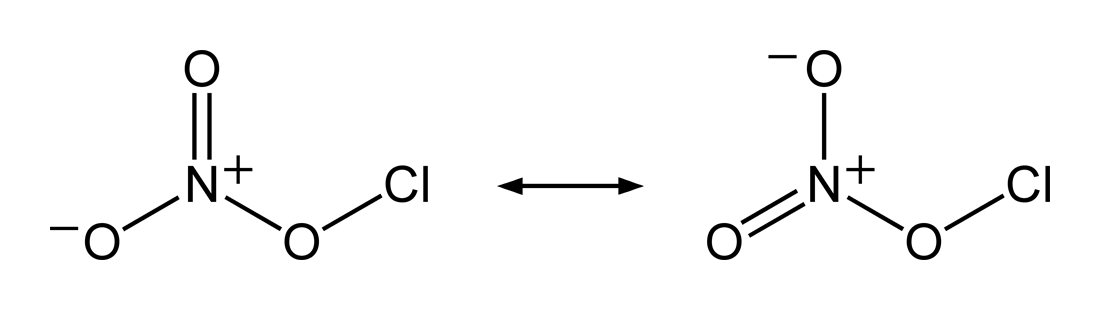
- Resonance stick models of chlorine nitrate

Names
- Preferred IUPAC name Chlorine nitrate
- Systematic IUPAC name Chloro nitrate
- Other names Nitryl hypochlorite

Identifiers
CAS Number	14545-72-3
3D model (JSmol)	Interactive image
ChemSpider	102875
PubChem CID	114934
CompTox Dashboard (EPA)	DTXSID00163043
- InChI: InChI=1S/ClNO3/c1-5-2(3)4 Key: XYLGPCWDPLOBGP-UHFFFAOYSA-N
- SMILES: ClON(=O)=O

Properties
Chemical formula	ClNO_{3}
Molar mass	97.46 g/mol
Density	1.65 g/cm^{3}
Melting point	−101 °C (−150 °F; 172 K)

Hazards
- GHS labelling
Pictograms	(GHS05: Corrosive) (GHS06: Toxic)
Signal word	Danger
NFPA 704 (fire diamond)	3 0 2 OX
- Except where otherwise noted, data are given for materials in their standard state (at 25 °C [77 °F], 100 kPa). Infobox references

Chlorine nitrate, with chemical formula ClONO_{2} is an important atmospheric gas present in the stratosphere. It is an important sink of reactive chlorine and nitrogen, and thus its formation and destruction play an important role in the depletion of ozone.

== Chemical properties ==
It explosively reacts with metals, metal chlorides, alcohols, ethers, and most organic materials. When it is heated to decomposition, it emits toxic fumes of Cl_{2} and NO_{x}.

== Synthesis and reactions ==
It can be produced by the reaction of dichlorine monoxide and dinitrogen pentoxide at 0 °C:

Cl_{2}O + N_{2}O_{5} → 2 ClONO_{2}

or by the reaction:

ClF + HNO_{3} → HF + ClONO_{2}

It can also react with alkenes:

(CH_{3})_{2}C=CH_{2} + ClONO_{2} → O_{2}NOC(CH_{3})_{2}CH_{2}Cl

Chlorine nitrate reacts with metal chlorides:

4 ClONO_{2} + TiCl_{4} → Ti(NO_{3})_{4} + 4 Cl_{2}
