= Raschig process =

The Raschig process could mean:

- The Raschig process for the production of hydroxylamine
- The Olin Raschig process for the production of hydrazine
- The Raschig–Hooker process for the production of phenol
