= Free base =

Pure molecular form of an amine, as opposed to its protonated salt form

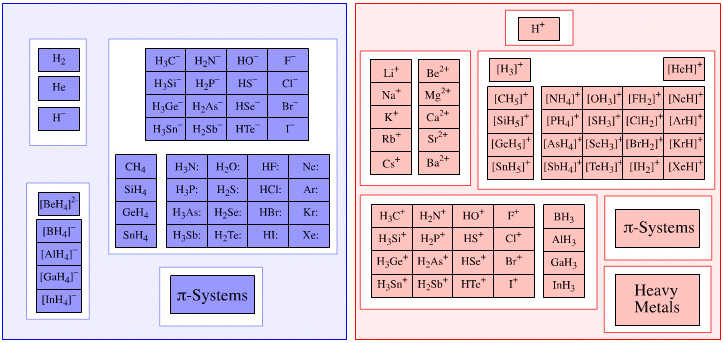
Lewis bases and acids

In chemistry, a free base (freebase, free-base) is the neutral form of an amine or other Lewis base. The term is used in the pharmaceutical industry in contrast to salt-based formulations like hydrochlorides. The amine is often an alkaloid, such as nicotine, morphine, and cocaine, or derivatives thereof.

Colloquially, "free-basing" also means the treatment of salts or other formulations to convert them into the free base form, especially for recreational drugs.

== Properties ==
Some alkaloids are more stable as ionic salts than as free base. The salts usually exhibit greater water solubility. Common counterions include chloride, bromide, sulfate, phosphate, nitrate, acetate, oxalate, citrate, and tartrate. Amine salts formed from the acid–base reaction with hydrochloric acid are known as hydrochlorides. For example, compare the free base hydroxylamine (NH_{2}OH) with the salt hydroxylamine hydrochloride (NH_{3}OH^{+} Cl^{−}).

== Freebasing ==
Cocaine hydrochloride ("powder cocaine") cannot be vaporized ("smoked"); it decomposes at high temperatures. Freebase cocaine (crack cocaine), on the other hand, has a melting point of 98°C and is volatile at temperatures above 90°C, and can be vaporized and inhaled.

After inhalation the alkaloid is absorbed into the blood stream and rapidly transported throughout the body. However, since blood is buffered with carbonate at physiological pH (near 7.4), free-base amines will be rapidly converted back into their acid form. In fact, 94.19% of cocaine will exist as the acid form under equilibrium at pH 7.4, calculated using the Henderson–Hasselbalch equation assuming a pKa of 8.61.

A small portion (5.81%) of cocaine will remain as free-base and pass through the blood-brain barrier; according to Le Chatelier's principle the acid form of cocaine will be continually converted to free-base as the base form is continually removed across the blood-brain barrier. Extraction kits for converting the hydrochloride to the base are commercially available.

=== Preparation ===
The free base form of cocaine is prepared from cocaine hydrochloride by extracting the cocaine with an alkaline solution (sodium hydroxide or ammonia) and adding a non-polar solvent such as diethyl ether or benzene. The mixture separates into two layers, the organic layer containing the dissolved cocaine, which is then separated and evaporated, leaving almost pure cocaine crystals that are white and crumbly. Alternatively, the free base can be obtained using an organic chemistry technique called trituration. Trituration of the free base from cocaine hydrochloride (or "cooking") is done by dissolving the cocaine hydrochloride in water over constant heat, while simultaneously adding a base (such as baking soda) to form the free base cocaine. The free base of cocaine forms a solid "rock", pieces of which can be smoked directly (crack cocaine).

=== Other ===
In South America, coca leaves are traditionally chewed with an alkaline lime substance, acquired from ash.

== Betel nut ==
In a similar fashion to coca leaves, betel nuts are chewed with added limestone, turning the active ingredient arecoline into the freebase form, allowing it to be absorbed sublingually.
