= Hydroxylammonium sulfate =

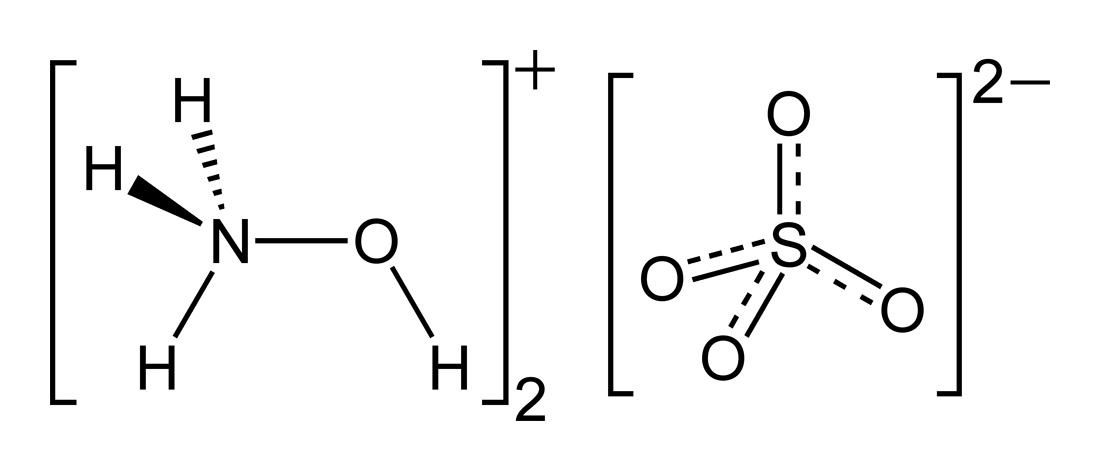

Names
- Other names Hydroxylamine sulfate

Identifiers
CAS Number	10039-54-0
3D model (JSmol)	Interactive image
ChEMBL	ChEMBL3183215
ChemSpider	23229
ECHA InfoCard	100.030.095
EC Number	233-118-8
PubChem CID	24846
RTECS number	NC5425000
UNII	49KP498D4O
UN number	2865
CompTox Dashboard (EPA)	DTXSID2025424
- InChI: InChI=1S/2H4NO.H2O4S/c2*1-2;1-5(2,3)4/h2*2H,1H3;(H2,1,2,3,4)/q2*+1;/p-2 Key: VGYYSIDKAKXZEE-UHFFFAOYSA-L; InChI=1/2H4NO.H2O4S/c2*1-2;1-5(2,3)4/h2*2H,1H3;(H2,1,2,3,4)/q2*+1;/p-2 Key: VGYYSIDKAKXZEE-NUQVWONBAN
- SMILES: [O-]S([O-])(=O)=O.O[NH3+].O[NH3+]

Properties
Chemical formula	H_{8}N_{2}O_{6}S
Molar mass	164.14 g/mol
Appearance	white crystalline to fine product, slightly hygroscopic
Density	1.88 g/cm^{3}
Melting point	120 °C (248 °F; 393 K) decomposes
Solubility in water	58.7 g/100 ml (20 °C)

Structure
Crystal structure	Monoclinic
Space group	P2_{1}/c
Lattice constant	a = 7.932±0.002 Å, b = 7.321±0.002 Å, c = 10.403±0.003 Å α = 90°, β = 106.93±0.03°, γ = 90°
Formula units (Z)	4

Hazards
- GHS labelling
Pictograms	(GHS05: Corrosive) (GHS07: Exclamation mark) (GHS08: Health hazard) (GHS09: Environmental hazard)
Signal word	Warning
Hazard statements	H290, H302, H312, H315, H317, H319, H351, H373, H400, H412
Precautionary statements	P201, P202, P234, P260, P264, P270, P272, P273, P280, P281, P301+P312, P302+P352, P305+P351+P338, P308+P313, P312, P314, P321, P322, P330, P332+P313, P333+P313, P337+P313, P362, P363, P390, P391, P404, P405, P501
NFPA 704 (fire diamond)	3 1 2
Safety data sheet (SDS)	External MSDS

Related compounds
Other anions	Hydroxylammonium nitrate Hydroxylammonium chloride
Other cations	Ammonium sulfate Hydrazinium sulfate
Related compounds	Hydroxylamine
- Except where otherwise noted, data are given for materials in their standard state (at 25 °C [77 °F], 100 kPa). verify (what is ?) Infobox references

Hydroxylammonium sulfate is the inorganic compound with the formula [NH_{3}OH]_{2}SO_{4}. A colorless solid, it is the sulfate salt of hydroxylamine. It is primarily used as an easily handled form of hydroxylamine, which is a volatile liquid.

== Production ==
Hydroxylammonium sulfate is prepared industrially by protonation of hydroxylamine. The latter is produced by the hydrogenation of nitric oxide using a platinum catalyst:

2 NO + 3 H_{2} + H_{2}SO_{4} → [NH_{3}OH]_{2}[SO_{4}]

Another route to NH_{2}OH is the Raschig process: aqueous ammonium nitrite is reduced by HSO^{−}_{3} and SO_{2} at 0 °C to yield a hydroxylamido-N,N-disulfonate anion:

[NH_{4}]^{+}[NO_{2}]^{−} + 2 SO_{2} + NH_{3} + H_{2}O → [NH_{4}]_{2}[HON(SO_{3})_{2}]

This ammonium hydroxylamine disulfonate anion is then hydrolyzed to give hydroxylammonium sulfate:

[NH_{4}]_{2}[HON(SO_{3})_{2}] + 2 H_{2}O → [HONH_{3}]_{2}SO_{4}

== Applications ==
Almost all hydroxylamine and its salts are used to make precursors to nylons via cyclohexanone oxime. Many aldehydes and ketones undergo the same conversion to oximes. carboxylic acids and their derivatives (e.g. esters) convert to hydroxamic acids. Isocyanates to N-hydroxyureas. Nitriles react to give amidoximes. Hydroxylammonium sulfate is also used to generate hydroxylamine-O-sulfonic acid from oleum or from chlorosulfuric acid.

Hydroxylammonium sulfate is used in the production of anti-skinning agents, pharmaceuticals, rubber, textiles, plastics and detergents. It is a radical scavenger that terminates radical polymerization reactions and serves as an antioxidant in natural rubber. (NH_{3}OH)_{2}SO_{4} is a starting material for some insecticides, herbicides and growth regulators. It is used in photography as a stabiliser for colour developers and as an additive in photographic emulsions in colour film.

== Structure ==
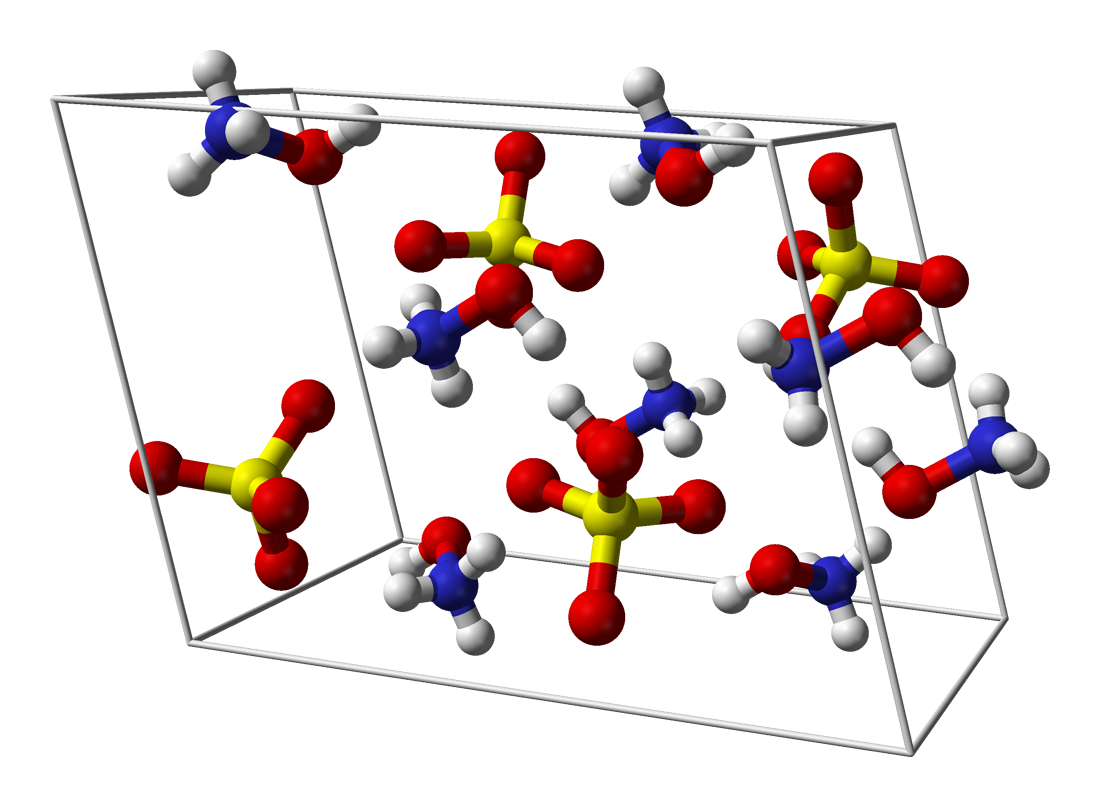

Hydroxylammonium sulfate exists as tetrahedral NH_{3}OH^{+} cations and sulfate anions.

== Safety ==
Hydroxylamine, which occurs widely in nature, has low toxicity. The compound is stable below 120 °C.
