= Raschig–Hooker process =

Chemical process for formation of phenol from benzene

The Raschig–Hooker process is a chemical process for the production of chlorobenzene and phenol from benzene.

Steps in the Raschig-Hooker process

The main steps in this process are the production of chlorobenzene from benzene, hydrochloric acid and oxygen, and the subsequent hydrolysis of chlorobenzene to phenol. The first step uses either a copper or iron chloride catalyst and exposes the materials to air at 200–250 °C. In the second step, the resulting chlorobenzene is introduced to steam at 450 °C over a silicon catalyst that hydrolyses the chlorobenzene, giving phenol and hydrogen chloride that can then be recycled back to the first step. Due to the two step nature, the Raschig–Hooker process can be used to produce either chlorobenzene or phenol.

== Comparison to other processes ==
The Raschig–Hooker route to phenol from benzene is comparable to the Dow and Bayer process, which also convert benzene into phenol. The recycling of the hydrogen chloride made the Raschig–Hooker process preferable to the Dow and Bayer process, which requires its sodium chloride product to be converted into chlorine and sodium hydroxide. The reaction, however, requires very high temperatures in a very acidic environment with hydrogen chloride vapor and therefore the industrial setting must use highly corrosion resistant equipment. While the Raschig–Hooker process does recycle the hydrogen chloride it produces, its catalyst experiences carbon deposition and must be frequently regenerated.

The Raschig–Hooker process suffers from selectivity issues in both steps. In the first step, the reaction is only run to 10% to 15% conversion to suppress formation of dichlorobenzene. Despite this, the overall selectivity of the reaction is 70% to 85%. This second addition can be reversed using the Hooker modification, although it is also costly. The second step shares the low conversion rate and high selectivity of the first step. The small amount conversion per reaction offsets the monetary benefit of recycling the hydrogen chloride due to the large initial cost of the reaction. Therefore, the Raschig–Hooker process needed to be run at high concentrations in large reactors to be industrially economical.

Due to its low productivity, this process is largely unused today. As of 1997, every plant in the United States that was using the Raschig–Hooker process has been shut down, although it was still used by some plants in countries such as Argentina, India, Italy, and Poland. Rather than using the Raschig–Hooker process, some companies use the Hock or cumene process, which instead synthesizes acetone and phenol from benzene and propylene. This preferred process has dominated the market, especially as acetone is also a highly desired substance.

== History ==
The oxychlorination of benzene was patented by Friedrich Raschig, a German chemist and politician, known for the Raschig process, the Olin Raschig process and the Raschig ring. He first begun to use this reaction in 1891 in order to manufacture phenol. The reaction of chlorobenzene with steam to give phenol was discovered by Meyer and Bergiusin in 1914.
