= Friedrich Raschig =

German chemist and politician (1863–1928)

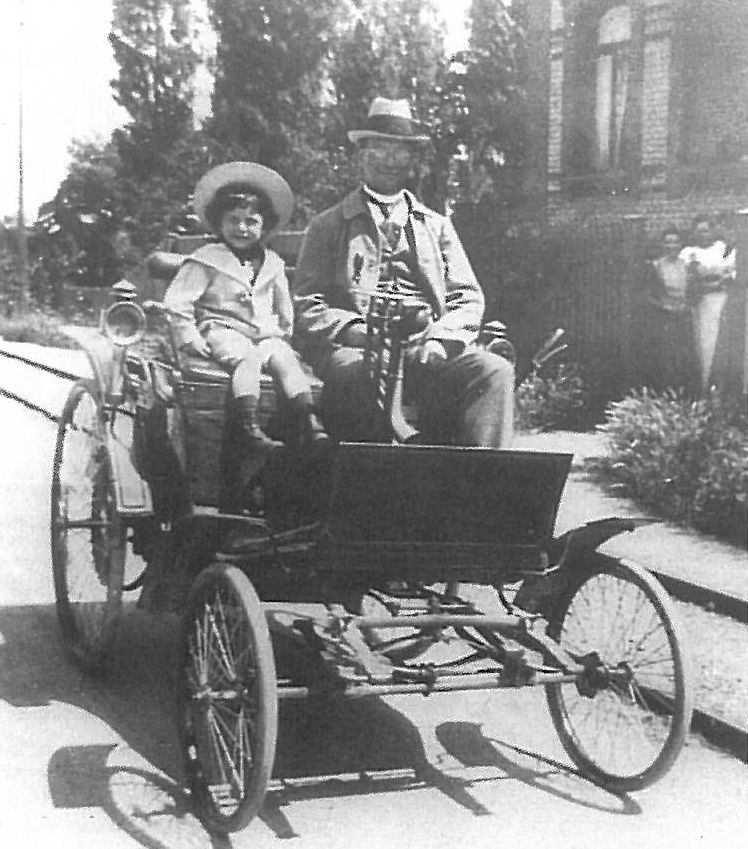
- Friedrich Raschig (1897).
- Born: 8 June 1863; Brandenburg an der Havel, Kingdom of Prussia
- Died: 4 February 1928 (aged 64); Duisburg, Germany
- Education: University of Berlin
- Known for: Raschig phenol process, Raschig ring
- Scientific career
- Doctoral advisor: Robert Wilhelm Bunsen

Friedrich August Raschig (also called Fritz Raschig) (German: [ˈfʁiːdʁɪç ˈʁaʃɪç]; 8 June 1863 – 4 February 1928) was a German chemist and politician. He was born in Brandenburg an der Havel. After he received his PhD in 1884 from the University of Berlin for his work with Robert Wilhelm Bunsen, he started working at the BASF company. In 1891 he opened his own chemical company in Ludwigshafen am Rhein (which still operates today as Raschig GmbH). He patented a number of chemical processes, particularly relating to phenols, one of which is now known as the Raschig phenol process, and nitrogen compounds—the Raschig process for producing hydroxylamine and the Olin Raschig process for producing hydrazine. He also developed improvements to distillation, in particular the Raschig ring, small metal or ceramic rings which are used in commercial fractional distillation columns.
