= C12H8 =

The molecular formula C_{12}H_{8} (molar mass: 152.19 g/mol, exact mass: 152.0626 u) may refer to:

- Acenaphthylene, a polycyclic aromatic hydrocarbon
- Biphenylene, an alternant, polycyclic hydrocarbon
