= Hydroxylamine reductase (NADH) =

Enzyme class

hydroxylamine reductase (NADH)

Identifiers
- EC no.: 1.7.1.10
- CAS no.: 9032-06-8

Databases
- IntEnz: IntEnz view
- BRENDA: BRENDA entry
- ExPASy: NiceZyme view
- KEGG: KEGG entry
- MetaCyc: metabolic pathway
- PRIAM: profile
- PDB structures: RCSB PDB PDBe PDBsum
- Gene Ontology: AmiGO / QuickGO
Search
- PMC: articles
- PubMed: articles
- NCBI: proteins

In enzymology, a hydroxylamine reductase (NADH) (EC 1.7.1.10) is an enzyme that catalyzes the chemical reaction.

NH_{3} + NAD^{+} + H_{2}O $\rightleftharpoons$ hydroxylamine + NADH + H^{+}

The 3 substrates of this enzyme are NH_{3}, NAD^{+}, and H_{2}O, whereas its 3 products are hydroxylamine, NADH, and H^{+}.

This enzyme belongs to the family of oxidoreductases, specifically those acting on other nitrogenous compounds as donors with NAD+ or NADP+ as acceptor. The systematic name of this enzyme class is ammonium:NAD+ oxidoreductase. Other names in common use include hydroxylamine reductase, ammonium dehydrogenase, NADH-hydroxylamine reductase, N-hydroxy amine reductase, hydroxylamine reductase (NADH2), and NADH2:hydroxylamine oxidoreductase. This enzyme participates in nitrogen metabolism.
