= Network Centric Airborne Defense Element =

Anti-ballistic missile system

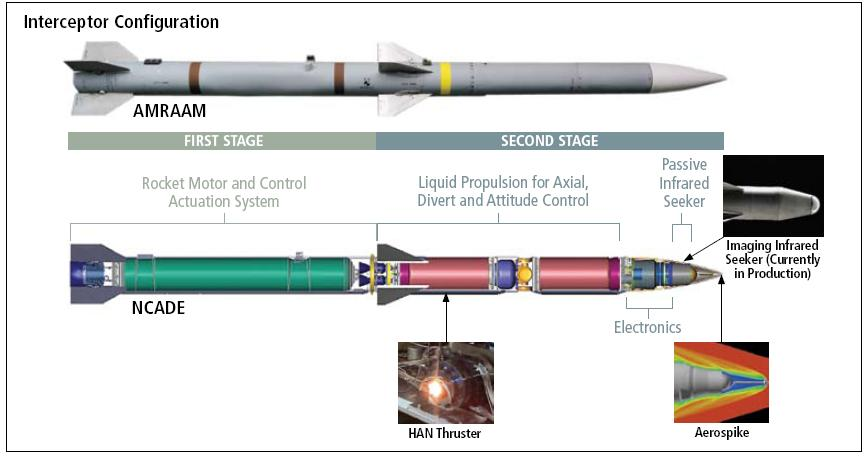
Diagram of the NCADE in comparison with AMRAAM

The Network Centric Airborne Defense Element (NCADE) was an anti-ballistic missile system being developed by Raytheon for the Missile Defense Agency. On September 18, 2008, Raytheon announced it had been awarded a $10 million contract to continue NCADE research and development. The NCADE system is a boost phase interceptor based heavily on the AIM-120 AMRAAM, with the AMRAAM fragmentation warhead replaced by a hit-to-kill vehicle powered by a hydroxylammonium nitrate-based monopropellant rocket engines from Aerojet.

On December 3, 2007, AIM-9X missiles with installed NCADE infrared seeker was tested against the Orion target rocket launched from White Sands Missile Range. Missiles were launched from the F-16 of the Air National Guard Air Force Reserve Command Test Center. One modified AIM-9X intercepted the target rocket and the other observed the intercept while also being on intercept trajectory.

In April 2008, Aerojet completed a full-duration test firing of an axial thruster for the second stage of NCADE. Thruster provided more than 660 N of thrust for more than 25 seconds.

The launch vehicle would be a Boeing F-15C Golden Eagle with an AESA radar.

NCADE is listed as "Discontinued" on the website of the Missile Defense Advocacy Alliance.
