= Hydroxylamine-O-sulfonic acid =

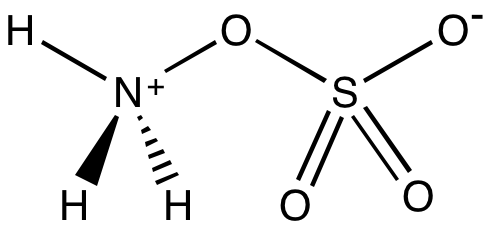

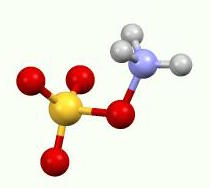
- Oxygen, O Nitrogen, N Sulfur, S Hydrogen, H

Names
- IUPAC name Amino hydrogen sulfate
- Systematic IUPAC name Aminosulfuric acid

Identifiers
CAS Number	2950-43-8
3D model (JSmol)	Interactive image
ChemSpider	68763
ECHA InfoCard	100.019.065
EC Number	220-971-6
PubChem CID	76284
UNII	YM8MWJ7XSP
CompTox Dashboard (EPA)	DTXSID50883542
- InChI: InChI=1S/H3NO4S/c1-5-6(2,3)4/h1H2,(H,2,3,4) Key: DQPBABKTKYNPMH-UHFFFAOYSA-N
- SMILES: NOS(=O)(=O)O

Properties
Chemical formula	H_{3}NO_{4}S
Molar mass	113.09
Appearance	white solid
Melting point	210 °C
Solubility in water	cold water
Acidity (pK_{a})	1.48
- Except where otherwise noted, data are given for materials in their standard state (at 25 °C [77 °F], 100 kPa). Infobox references

Hydroxylamine-O-sulfonic acid (HOSA) or aminosulfuric acid is the inorganic compound with molecular formula H_{3}NO_{4}S that is formed by the sulfonation of hydroxylamine with oleum. It is a white, water-soluble and hygroscopic, solid, commonly represented by the condensed structural formula H_{2}NOSO_{3}H, though it actually exists as a zwitterion and thus is more accurately represented as ^{+}H_{3}NOSO_{3}^{−}. It is used as a reagent for the introduction of amine groups (–NH_{2}), for the conversion of aldehydes into nitriles and alicyclic ketones into lactams (cyclic amides), and for the synthesis of variety of nitrogen-containing heterocycles.

== Preparation ==
According to a laboratory procedure hydroxylamine-O-sulfonic acid can be prepared by treating hydroxylamine sulfate with fuming sulfuric acid (oleum). The industrial process is similar.

(NH_{3}OH)_{2}SO_{4} + 2SO_{3} → 2H_{2}NOSO_{3}H + H_{2}SO_{4}

The sulfonation of hydroxylamine can also be effected with chlorosulfonic acid by a method first published in 1925 and refined for Organic Syntheses.

The hydroxylamine-O-sulfonic acid, which should be stored at 0 °C to prevent decomposition, can be checked by iodometric titration.

== Structure ==
Analogous to sulfamic acid (H_{3}N^{+}SO_{3}^{−}) and as is the case generally for amino acids, HOSA exists in the solid state as a zwitterion: H_{3}N^{+}OSO_{3}^{−}. It resembles an ammonia molecule coordinate covalently bonded to a sulfate group.

== Reactions ==
HOSA reacts under basic conditions as an electrophile and under neutral or acidic conditions as a nucleophile.

Reaktivität of Hydroxylamine-O-sulfonsäure als Elektrophil und als Nukleophil

=== Aminations ===
Synthesis of N-Aminopiperidin with HOSA

It reacts with tertiary amines to trisubstituted hydrazinium salts and with pyridine to the 1-amino pyridinium salt.

Synthesis of 1-Aminopyridin with HOSA

From 1-aminopyridinium salts the photochemically active 1-N-iminopyridinium ylides are accessible by acylation. The photochemical rearrangement of the obtained 1-N-iminipyridinium ylides leads in high yields to 1H-1,2-diazepines

Synthesis of 1,2-Diazepinen aus Iminopyridiniumyliden

N-amination of 1H-benzotriazole with hydroxylamine-O-sulfonic acid yields a mixture of 1-aminobenzotriazole (major product) and 2-aminobenzotriazole (minor product). From 1-aminotriazole, benzyne is formed in an almost quantitative yield by oxidation with lead(IV) acetate, which rapidly dimerizes to biphenylene in good yields.

Synthesis of Benzyne and Biphenylene from 1-Aminobenzotriazole

Electron deficient heterocycles, such as tetrazole, can be N-aminated with hydroxylamine-O-sulfonic acid, while even more electron-deficient compounds, such as 5-nitrotetrazole, react only with stronger aminating agents such as O-tosylhydroxylamine or O- mesitylene sulfonylhydroxylamine to amino compounds, which were investigated as explosives.

1-Aminotetrazol und 2-Aminotetrazol durch Aminierung of Tetrazol with HOSA

In the N-amination of the unsubstituted tetrazole, a mixture of 1-amino- and 2-aminotetrazole is obtained.

Synthesis of Sulfiminen with HOSA

Also sulfur compounds (such as thioethers) can be aminated with hydroxylamine-O-sulfonic acid to sulfinimines (isosteric with sulfoxides but far more unstable) or phosphorus compounds (such as triphenylphosphine) can be aminated to phosphine imides via the intermediate aminotriphenylphosphonium hydrogen sulfate.

The reaction of hydroxylamine-O-sulfonic acid with metal salts of sulfinic acids in sodium acetate solution produces primary sulfonamides in very good yields.

Synthesis of primären Sulfonamiden aus Sulfinaten

Diimine can formed in situ from hydroxylamine-O-sulfonic acid respectively hydroxylamine-O-sulfonic acid hydroxylamine sulfate mixtures, which hydrogenates selectively conjugated multiple bonds.[20]

=== With carbonyl compounds ===
At room temperature and below, hydroxylamine-O-sulfonic acid reacts with ketones and aldehydes as a nucleophile to the corresponding oxime-O-sulfonic acids or their salts. The oxime-O-sulfonic acids of aldehydes react above room temperature upon elimination of sulfuric acid in high yields to nitriles.

Reaktion of HOSA with Carbonylverbindungen

Aliphatic ketones provide under similar conditions in very high yields oximes, arylalkyl ketones react in a Beckmann rearrangement to amides. When heated to reflux for several hours under acidic conditions (e.g., in the presence of concentrated formic acid) alicyclic ketones react to provide lactams in high yields.

2-Azacyclooctanon durch Reaktion of Cycloheptanon with HOSA

Under basic conditions in the presence of primary amines, hydroxylamine-O-sulfonic acid forms with aldehydes and ketones (e.g. cyclohexanone) diaziridines, which can easily be oxidized to the more stable diazirines.

3,3-Pentamethylendiaziridin durch Reaktion of Cyclohexanon mit HOSA

The reaction also provides substituted aziridines from simple aldehydes and ketones with high yield and diastereoselectivity.

Synthesis of Diaziridinen with HOSA

1,2-Benzisoxazole is efficiently produced by nucleophilic attack of hydroxylamine-O-sulfonic acid to the carbonyl group of 2-hydroxybenzaldehyde followed by cyclization.

Synthesis of 1,2-Benzisoxazol aus Salicylaldehyd und HOSA

1,2-Benzisoxazole is a structural element in the antipsychotic risperidone and paliperidone, as well as the anticonvulsant zonisamide.

In a one-pot reaction, N-aryl[3,4-d]pyrazolopyrimidines are obtained in good yields from simple 4,6-dichloropyrimidine-5-carboxaldehyde,

N-Aryl-Pyrazolopyrimidine

which can be used as purine analogs for a wide range of diagnostic and therapeutic applications.

=== Further reactions ===
The chemiluminescence of the system luminol/cobalt(II) chloride is dramatically enhanced by the addition of hydroxylamine-O-sulfonic acid.
