= Hydroxylammonium nitrate =

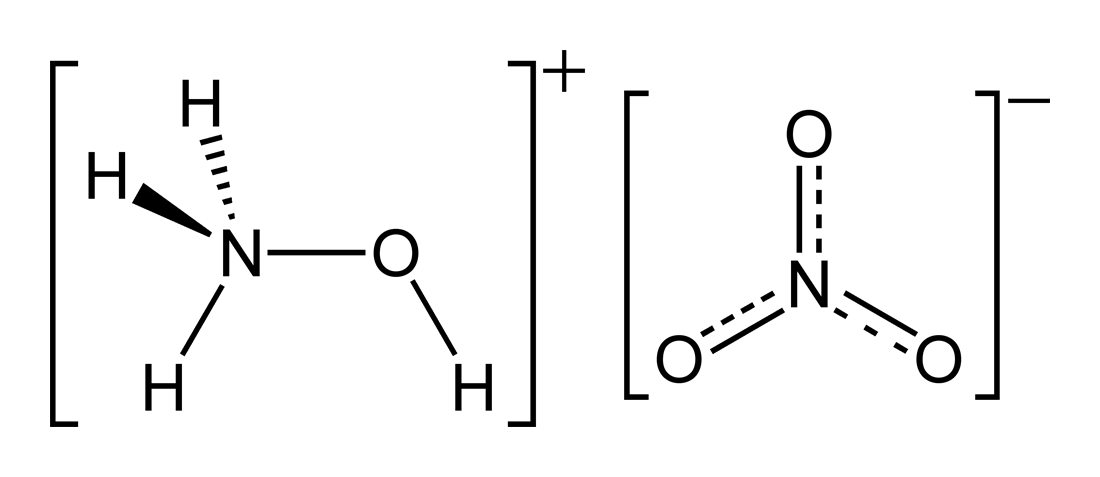

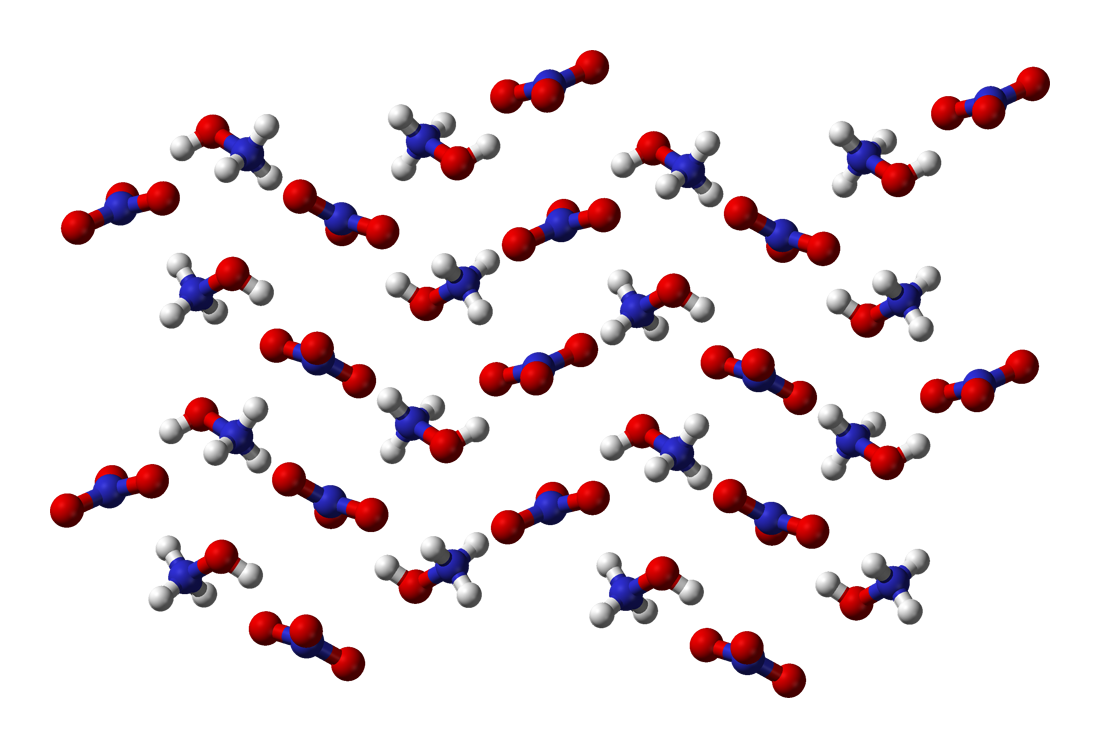

Names
- Other names hydroxylamine nitrate

Identifiers
CAS Number	13465-08-2
3D model (JSmol)	Interactive image
ChemSpider	24259
ECHA InfoCard	100.033.342
EC Number	236-691-2
PubChem CID	26045
CompTox Dashboard (EPA)	DTXSID30884613
- InChI: InChI=1S/NO3.H4NO/c2-1(3)4;1-2/h;2H,1H3/q-1;+1 Key: CRJZNQFRBUFHTE-UHFFFAOYSA-N; InChI=1/NO3.H4NO/c2-1(3)4;1-2/h;2H,1H3/q-1;+1 Key: CRJZNQFRBUFHTE-UHFFFAOYAP
- SMILES: [NH3+]O.[N+](=O)([O-])[O-]

Properties
Chemical formula	[NH_{3}OH]^{+}[NO_{3}]^{−}
Molar mass	96.042 g·mol^{−1}
Density	1.84 g/cm^{3}
Melting point	48 °C
Solubility in water	Soluble

Hazards
- GHS labelling
Pictograms	(GHS01: Explosive) (GHS06: Toxic) (GHS07: Exclamation mark) (GHS08: Health hazard) (GHS09: Environmental hazard)
Signal word	Danger
Hazard statements	H201, H302, H311, H315, H317, H319, H351, H373, H400
Precautionary statements	P201, P202, P210, P230, P240, P250, P260, P264, P270, P272, P273, P280, P281, P301+P312, P302+P352, P305+P351+P338, P308+P313, P312, P314, P321, P322, P330, P332+P313, P333+P313, P337+P313, P361, P362, P363, P370+P380, P372, P373, P391, P401, P405, P501
Safety data sheet (SDS)	External MSDS (as 18 % solution)

Related compounds
Other anions	Hydroxylammonium sulfate Hydroxylammonium chloride
Other cations	Ammonium nitrate
Related compounds	Hydroxylamine
- Except where otherwise noted, data are given for materials in their standard state (at 25 °C [77 °F], 100 kPa). verify (what is ?) Infobox references

Hydroxylammonium nitrate or hydroxylamine nitrate (HAN) is an inorganic compound with the chemical formula [NH_{3}OH]^{+}[NO_{3}]^{−}. It is a salt derived from hydroxylamine and nitric acid. In its pure form, it is a colourless hygroscopic solid. It has potential to be used as a rocket propellant either as a solution in monopropellants or bipropellants. Hydroxylammonium nitrate (HAN)-based propellants are a viable and effective solution for future "green" propellant-based missions, as it offers 50% higher performance for a given propellant tank compared to commercially used hydrazine.

== Properties ==
The compound is a salt with separated hydroxyammonium and nitrate ions. Hydroxylammonium nitrate is unstable because it contains both a reducing agent (hydroxylammonium cation) and an oxidizer (nitrate), the situation being analogous to ammonium nitrate. It is usually handled as an aqueous solution with small amount of nitric acid as a stabilizer. The solution is corrosive and toxic, and may be carcinogenic. Solid HAN is unstable, especially in the presence of trace amounts of iron(III).

== Laboratory preparatory routes ==
1. Catalytic reduction of nitric oxides
2. Double decomposition
3. Electrolysis
4. Hydrogenation of nitric acid
5. Ion exchange via resins
6. Neutralization

== Applications ==
HAN has applications as a component of rocket propellant, in both solid and liquid form. HAN and ammonium dinitramide (ADN), another energetic ionic compound, were investigated as less-toxic replacements for toxic hydrazine for monopropellant rockets where only a catalyst is needed to cause decomposition. HAN and ADN will work as monopropellants in water solution, as well as when dissolved with fuel liquids such as methanol.

HAN is used by the Network Centric Airborne Defense Element boost-phase interceptor being developed by Raytheon. As a solid propellant oxidizer, it is typically bonded with glycidyl azide polymer (GAP), hydroxyl-terminated polybutadiene (HTPB), or carboxy-terminated polybutadiene (CTPB) and requires preheating to 200-300 °C to decompose. When used as a monopropellant, the catalyst is a noble metal, similar to the other monopropellants that use silver, palladium, or iridium.

HAN also enabled the development of solid propellants that could be controlled electrically and switched on and off. Developed by DSSP for special effects and microthrusters, these were the first HAN-based propellants in space; and aboard the Naval Research Laboratory SpinSat, launched in 2014.

It was used in a fuel/oxidizer blend known as "AF-M315E" in the high thrust engines of the Green Propellant Infusion Mission, which was initially expected to be launched in 2015, and eventually launched and deployed on 25 June 2019. The specific impulse of AF-M315E is 257 s. The aqueous solution of HAN can be added with fuel components such as methanol, glycine, TEAN (triethanolammonium nitrate), and amines to form high performance monopropellants for space propulsion systems.

China Aerospace Science and Technology Corporation (CASC) launched a demonstration of HAN-based thruster aboard a microsatellite in January 2018.

Japanese technology demonstration satellite Innovative Satellite Technology Demonstration-1, launched in January 2019, contains a demonstration thruster using HAN and operated successfully in orbit.

HAN is sometimes used in nuclear reprocessing as a reducing agent for plutonium ions.

== Bibliography ==
- Donald G. Harlow et al. (1998). "Technical Report on Hydroxlyamine Nitrate". U.S. Department of Energy. DOE/EH-0555
- Gösta Bengtsson et al. (2002) "The kinetics and mechanism of oxidation of hydroxylamine by iron(III)". J. Chem. Soc., Dalton Trans., 2002, 2548–2552. doi:10.1039/B201602H
- Schmidt, Eckart W. (2022). "Hydroxylammonium Salts". Encyclopedia of Oxidizers. Vol. 3. De Gruyter. pp. 1589–1816. doi:10.1515/9783110750294-011. ISBN 978-3-11-075029-4.
- Schmidt, Eckart W. (2023). "Hydroxylammonium Nitrate-Based Monopropellants". Encyclopedia of Monopropellants. Vol. 2. De Gruyter. pp. 807–1194. doi:10.1515/9783110751390-007. ISBN 978-3-11-075139-0.
