= Raschig hydroxylamine process =

The Raschig process for the production of hydroxylamine is one of three chemical processes developed by German chemist Friedrich Raschig. The main step in this process, patented by Raschig in 1887, is the reduction of nitrite with bisulfite towards hydroxylamine disulfonate, which is hydrolysed to hydroxylammonium sulfate. Most of the hydroxylamine produced is used in the manufacture of caprolactam, the precursor to the polymer Nylon 6.

The commercially used Raschig process consists of the following steps:

- ammonium carbonate solution is prepared by reacting ammonia, carbon dioxide and water
- an alkaline solution of ammonium nitrite is formed by reacting ammonium carbonate solution with nitrogen oxides
- ammonium nitrite is converted to hydroxylamine disulfonate with bisulfite (obtained by blowing sulfur dioxide through the carbonate solution)
- hydroxylamine disulfonate is hydrolysed to hydroxylammonium sulfate
