= Biphenylene =

- Diphenylene

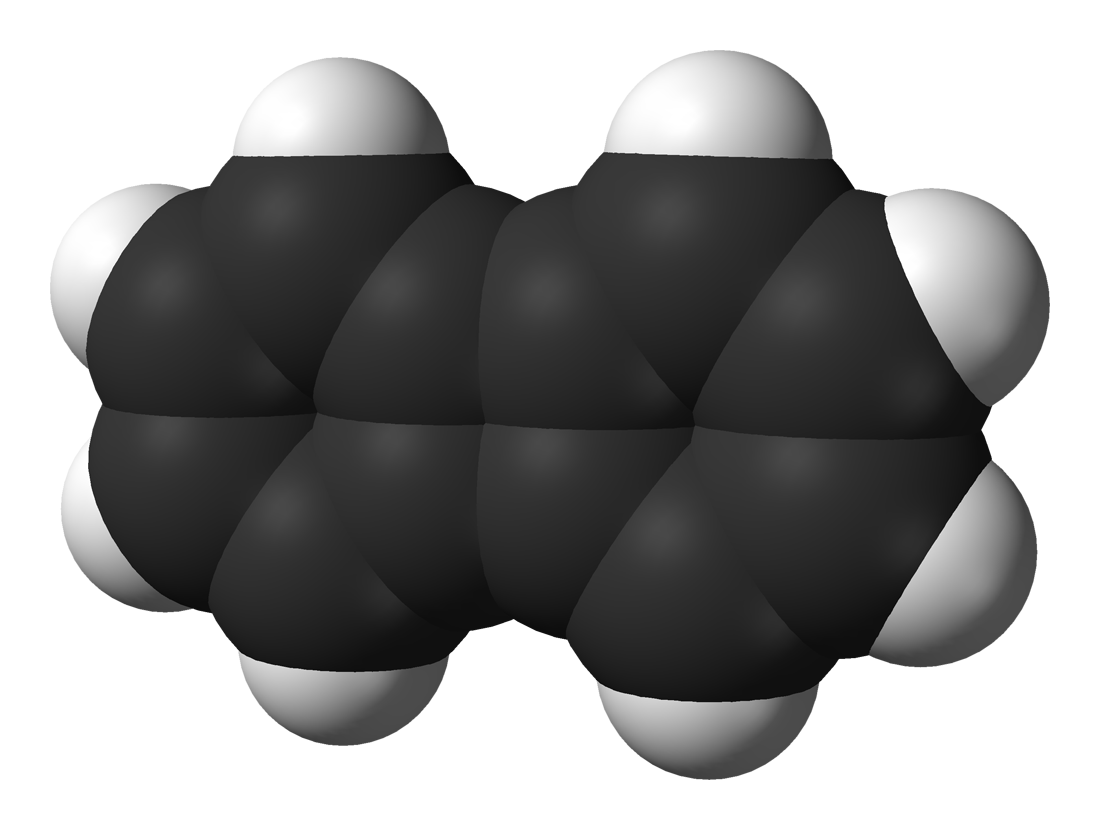
- Diphnylene 3D

Names
- Preferred IUPAC name Biphenylene
- Other names Diphenylene

Identifiers
CAS Number	259-79-0
3D model (JSmol)	Interactive image
ChEBI	CHEBI:33079
ChemSpider	8859
ECHA InfoCard	100.217.287
PubChem CID	9214
UNII	0Z64I7D5M2
CompTox Dashboard (EPA)	DTXSID3059765
- InChI: InChI=1S/C12H8/c1-2-6-10-9(5-1)11-7-3-4-8-12(10)11/h1-8H Key: IFVTZJHWGZSXFD-UHFFFAOYSA-N; InChI=1/C12H8/c1-2-6-10-9(5-1)11-7-3-4-8-12(10)11/h1-8H Key: IFVTZJHWGZSXFD-UHFFFAOYAR
- SMILES: c1ccc-2c(c1)-c3c2cccc3

Properties
Chemical formula	C_{12}H_{8}
Molar mass	152.196 g·mol^{−1}
Appearance	Solid
Melting point	109 to 111 °C (228 to 232 °F; 382 to 384 K)

Related compounds
Related unsaturated hydrocarbons	benzene biphenyl cyclobutene cyclobutadiene
- Except where otherwise noted, data are given for materials in their standard state (at 25 °C [77 °F], 100 kPa). verify (what is ?) Infobox references

Biphenylene is an organic compound with the formula (C_{6}H_{4})_{2}. It is a pale, yellowish solid with a hay-like odor. Despite its unusual structure, it behaves like a traditional polycyclic aromatic hydrocarbon.

== Bonding ==
Biphenylene is a polycyclic hydrocarbon, composed of two benzene rings joined by two bridging bonds (as opposed to a normal ring fusion), thus forming a 6–4–6 arene system. The resulting planar structure was one of the first π-electronic hydrocarbon systems discovered to show evidence of antiaromaticity. The spectral and chemical properties show the influence of the central [4n] ring, leading to considerable interest in the system in terms of its degree of lessened aromaticity. Questions of bond alternation and ring currents have been investigated repeatedly. Both X-ray diffraction and electron diffraction studies show a considerable alternation of bond lengths, with the bridging bonds between the benzenoid rings having the unusually great length of 1.524 Å. The separation of the rings is also reflected by the absence of the transmission of NMR substituent effects through the central [4n] ring. However, more sensitive NMR evidence, and particularly the shifting of proton resonances to high field, does indicate the existence of electron delocalization in the central [4n] ring. This upfield shift has been interpreted in terms of diminished benzenoid ring currents, either with or without an accompanying paramagnetic ring current in the central [4n] ring. Magnetic susceptibility measurements also show a diminishing of both diamagnetic exaltation and diamagnetic anisotropy, relative to comparable pure [4n + 2] systems, which is also consistent with a reduction of ring current diamagnetism. The electronic structure of biphenylene in the gas phase has the HOMO at a binding energy of 7.8 eV.

== Preparation ==
Biphenylene was first synthesized by Lothrop in 1941. The biphenylene structure can also be understood as a dimer of the reactive intermediate benzyne, which in fact serves as a major synthetic route, by heating the benzenediazonium-2-carboxylate zwitterion prepared from 2-aminobenzoic acid. Another approach is by N-amination of 1H-benzotriazole with hydroxylamine-O-sulfonic acid. The major product, 1-aminobenzotriazole, forms benzyne in an almost quantitative yield by oxidation with lead(IV) acetate, which rapidly dimerises to biphenylene in good yields.

Synthesis of Benzyne and Biphenylene from 1H-Benzotriazole

In the laboratory, flash vacuum pyrolysis of phthalic anhydride and other arylcarbonyls produces biphenylene.

== Higher biphenylenes ==
Polycycles containing the biphenylene nucleus have also been prepared, some having considerable antiaromatic character. In general, additional 6-membered rings add further aromatic character, and additional 4-membered and 8-membered rings add antiaromatic character. However, the exact natures of the additions and fusions greatly affect the perturbations of the biphenylene system, with many fusions resulting in counter-intuitive stabilization by [4n] rings, or destabilization by 6-membered rings. This has led to significant interest in the systems by theoretical chemists and graph theoreticians.

=== Network ===
A complete 2-dimensional carbon sheet with biphenylene-like subunits has been proposed and was in-depth investigated by theoretical means, finding a technologically relevant direct band gap of around 1 eV, excitonic binding energies of around 0.5 eV and potential as a gas sensor.

Later, researchers synthesized a biphenylene sheet consisting of sp^{2}-hybridized carbon atoms that formed four-, six-, and eight-membered rings on a smooth gold surface. A bottom-up two-step interpolymer dehydrofluorination of an adsorbed halogenated terphenyl molecule polymerization yielded ultraflat four- and eight-membered rings. The resulting allotrope was metallic.
