= Hydroxylammonium chloride =

Chemical compound, [NH3OH]Cl

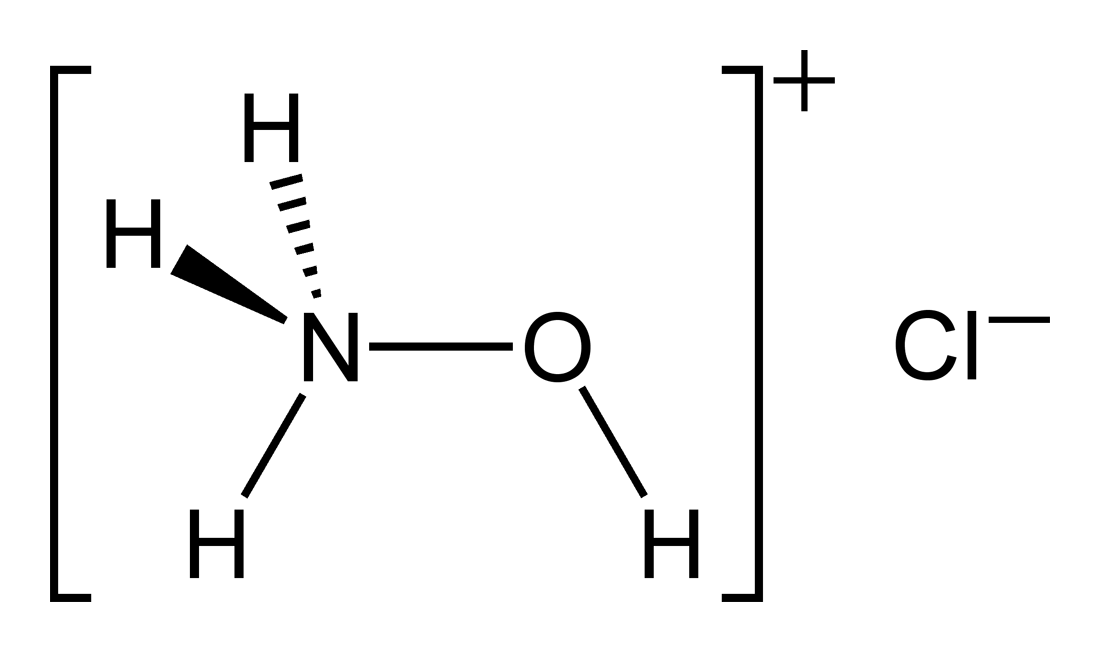

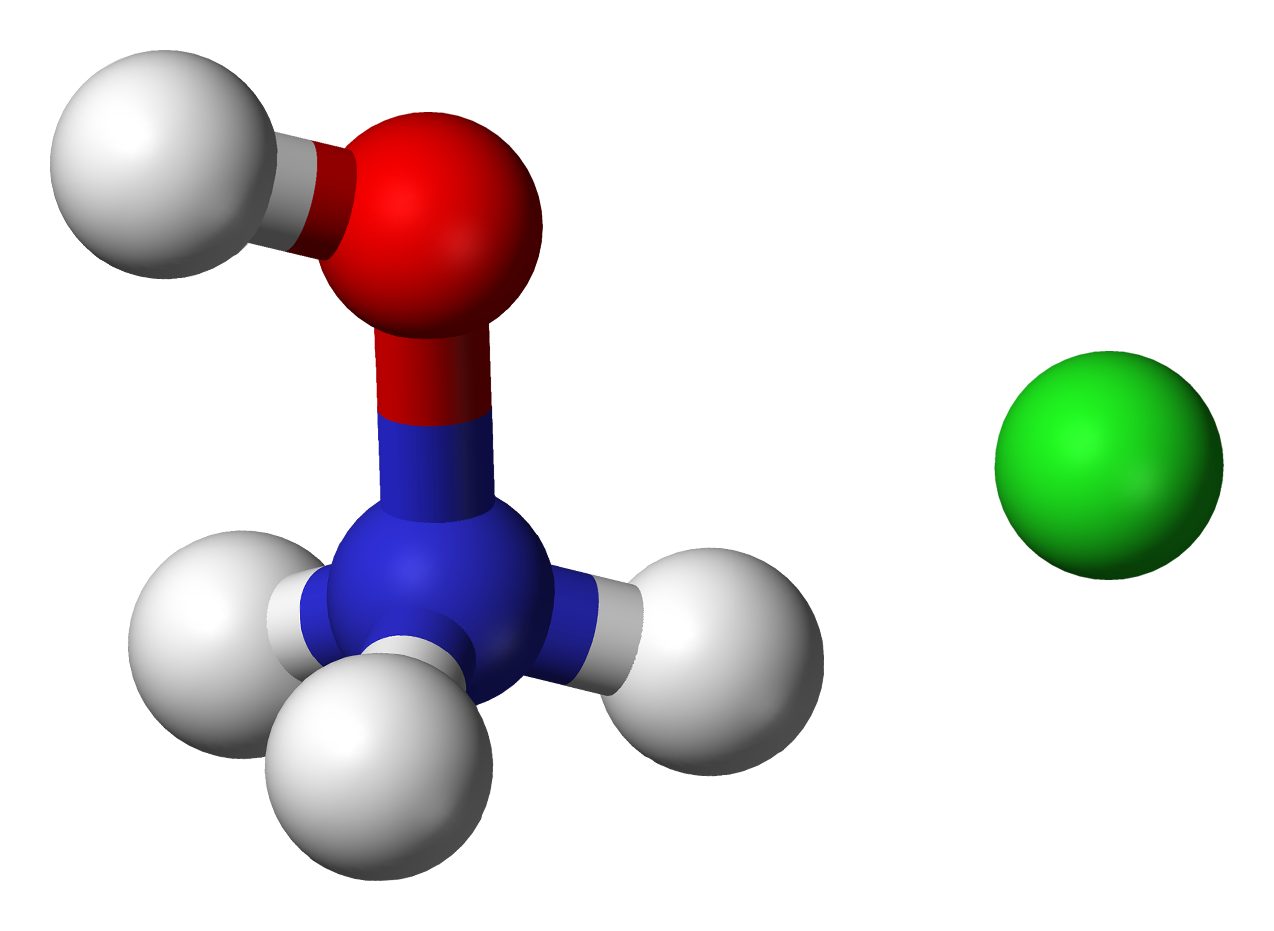
- Ball-and-stick model of a hydroxylammonium cation (left) and a chloride anion (right)

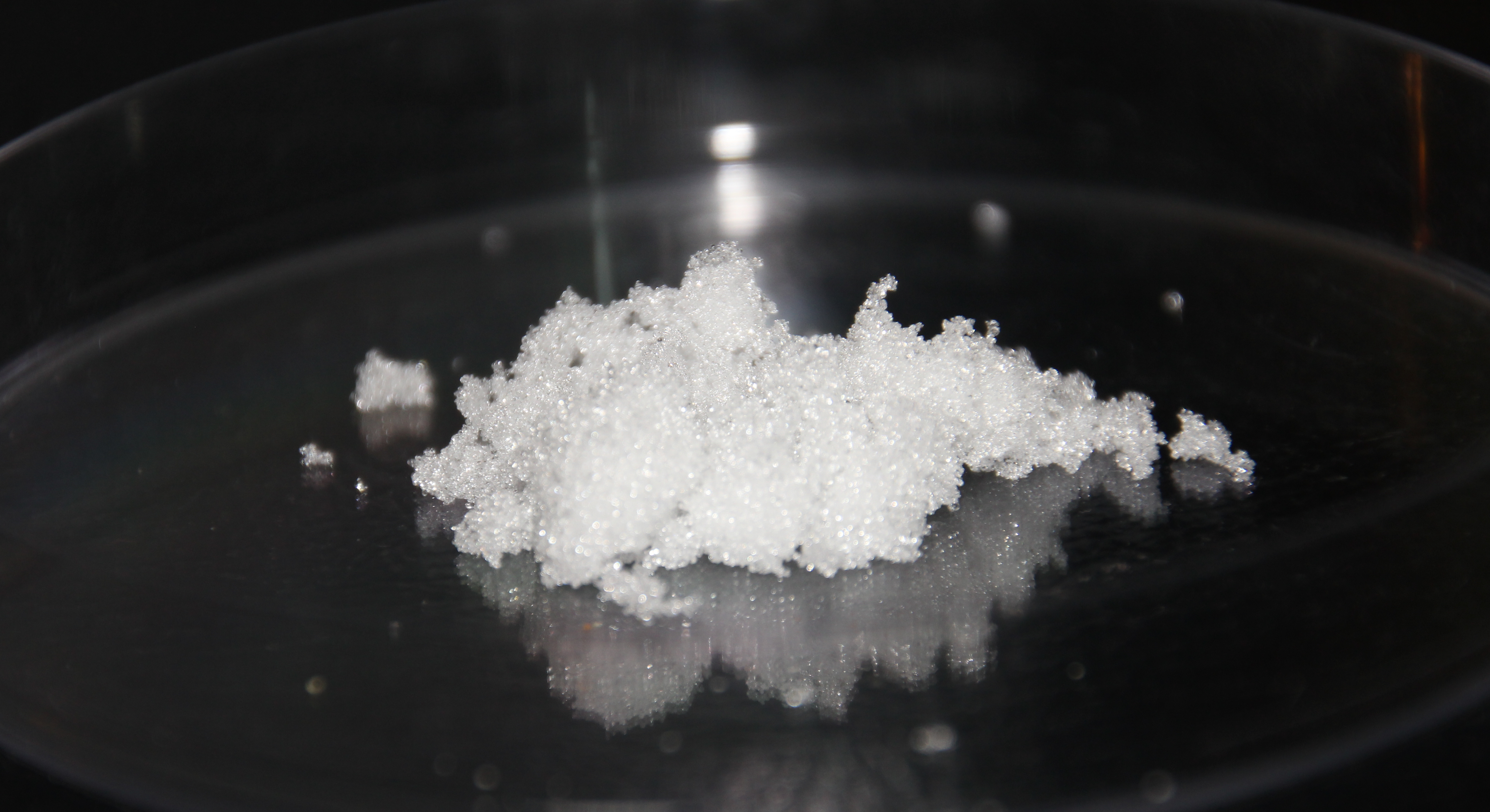

Names
- Other names Hydroxylamine hydrochloride

Identifiers
CAS Number	5470-11-1
3D model (JSmol)	Interactive image
ChEBI	CHEBI:5807
ChEMBL	ChEMBL542448
ChemSpider	20344
ECHA InfoCard	100.024.362
EC Number	226-798-2
KEGG	C11598
PubChem CID	443297
RTECS number	NC3675000
UNII	5X4ZA62Z4Q
CompTox Dashboard (EPA)	DTXSID7025425
- InChI: InChI=1S/ClH.H4NO/c;1-2/h1H;2H,1H3/q;+1/p-1 Key: WCYJQVALWQMJGE-UHFFFAOYSA-M; InChI=1/ClH.H4NO/c;1-2/h1H;2H,1H3/q;+1/p-1 Key: WCYJQVALWQMJGE-REWHXWOFAB
- SMILES: [Cl-].O[NH3+]

Properties
Chemical formula	[NH_{3}OH]Cl
Molar mass	69.49 g·mol^{−1}
Appearance	white crystalline solid
Density	1.67 g/cm^{3}
Melting point	155 to 157 °C (311 to 315 °F; 428 to 430 K) decomposes
Conjugate base	Hydroxylamine

Hazards
- GHS labelling
Pictograms	(GHS05: Corrosive) (GHS06: Toxic) (GHS07: Exclamation mark) (GHS08: Health hazard) (GHS09: Environmental hazard)
Signal word	Danger
Hazard statements	H290, H301, H302, H312, H315, H317, H319, H351, H373, H400
Precautionary statements	P201, P202, P234, P260, P264, P270, P272, P273, P280, P281, P301+P310, P301+P312, P302+P352, P305+P351+P338, P308+P313, P312, P314, P321, P322, P330, P332+P313, P333+P313, P337+P313, P362, P363, P390, P391, P404, P405, P501
NFPA 704 (fire diamond)	3 1 1

Related compounds
Other anions	Hydroxylammonium nitrate; Hydroxylammonium sulfate
Other cations	Ammonium chloride; Hydraziniumchlorid; Methylammonium chloride
- Except where otherwise noted, data are given for materials in their standard state (at 25 °C [77 °F], 100 kPa). verify (what is ?) Infobox references

Hydroxylammonium chloride is a chemical compound with the formula [NH_{3}OH]Cl. It is a white crystalline solid. It is the hydroxylamine (NH_{2}OH) salt of hydrogen chloride (HCl). It consists of hydroxylammonium cations [NH_{3}OH]^{+} and chloride anions Cl^{−}. Hydroxylamine is a biological intermediate in nitrification (biological oxidation of ammonia with oxygen into nitrite) and in anammox (biological oxidation of nitrite and ammonium into dinitrogen gas) which are important in the nitrogen cycle in soil and in wastewater treatment plants.

== Applications ==
Hydroxylammonium chloride is used in organic synthesis for preparation of oximes and hydroxamic acids from carboxylic acids, N- and O- substituted hydroxylamines, and addition reactions of carbon-carbon double bond.

During the acetyl bromide method of extracting lignin from lignocellulosic biomass, hydroxylammonium chloride can be used to remove bromine and polybromide from the solution.

In surface treatments, it is used in the preparation of anti-skinning agents, corrosion inhibitors, and cleaner additives. It is also a starting material for pharmaceuticals and agrochemicals manufacturing. In the rubber and plastics industries, it is an antioxidant, vulcanization accelerator, and radical scavenger.

It is also used as a fixative for textile dyes, auxiliary in some dyeing processes, as a metal extraction and flotation aid, as an antioxidant in fatty acids and soaps, and as a color stabilizer and emulsion additive in color films.

It is also used in analytic chemistry in the analysis of iron in the water combined with α,α-dipyridyl. The hydroxylammonium chloride transforms all the iron in Fe^{2+}, that then forms a coordination complex with the dipyridyl.
