= Hydroxylamine =

Inorganic compound

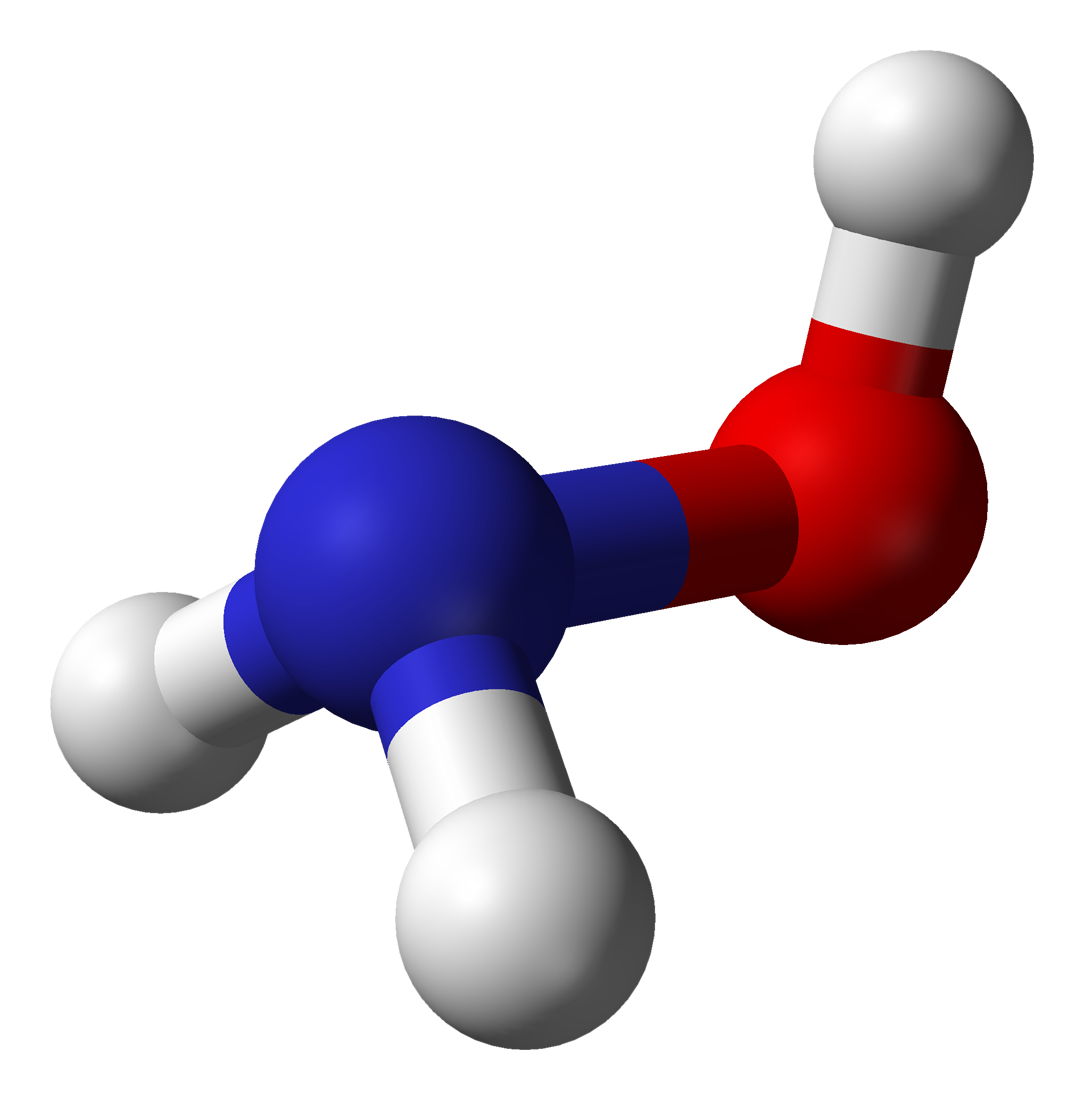
- Stereo, skeletal formula of hydroxylamine with all explicit hydrogens added

- Stereo, skeletal formula of hydroxylamine with all explicit hydrogens added and assorted dimensions

Names
- IUPAC name Azinous acid
- Preferred IUPAC name Hydroxylamine (only preselected)
- Other names: Aminol; Azanol; Hydroxyammonia; Hydroxyamine; Hydroxyazane; Hydroxylazane; Nitrinous acid

Identifiers
CAS Number	7803-49-8
3D model (JSmol)	Interactive image
ChEBI	CHEBI:15429
ChEMBL	ChEMBL1191361
ChemSpider	766
ECHA InfoCard	100.029.327
EC Number	232-259-2
Gmelin Reference	478
KEGG	C00192
MeSH	Hydroxylamine
PubChem CID	787
RTECS number	NC2975000
UNII	2FP81O2L9Z
CompTox Dashboard (EPA)	DTXSID7041043
- InChI: InChI=1S/H3NO/c1-2/h2H,1H2 Key: AVXURJPOCDRRFD-UHFFFAOYSA-N; InChI=1/H3NO/c1-2/h2H,1H2 Key: AVXURJPOCDRRFD-UHFFFAOYAD
- SMILES: NO

Properties
Chemical formula	NH_{2}OH
Molar mass	33.030 g·mol^{−1}
Appearance	Vivid white, opaque crystals
Density	1.21 g cm^{−3} (at 20 °C)
Melting point	33 °C (91 °F; 306 K)
Boiling point	58 °C (136 °F; 331 K) /22 mm Hg (decomposes)
Solubility in water	Soluble
log P	−0.758
Acidity (pK_{a})	6.03 ([NH_{3}OH]^{+})
Basicity (pK_{b})	7.97

Structure
Coordination geometry	Tricoordinated at N, dicoordinated at O
Molecular shape	Trigonal pyramidal at N, bent at O
Dipole moment	0.67553 D

Thermochemistry
Heat capacity (C)	46.47 J/(K·mol)
Std molar entropy (S^{⦵}_{298})	236.18 J/(K·mol)
Std enthalpy of formation (Δ_{f}H^{⦵}_{298})	−39.9 kJ/mol

Hazards
- GHS labelling
Pictograms	(GHS01: Explosive) (GHS05: Corrosive) (GHS07: Exclamation mark) (GHS08: Health hazard) (GHS09: Environmental hazard)
Signal word	Danger
Hazard statements	H200, H290, H302, H312, H315, H317, H318, H335, H351, H373, H400
Precautionary statements	P201, P202, P234, P260, P264, P270, P271, P272, P273, P280, P281, P301+P312, P302+P352, P304+P340, P305+P351+P338, P308+P313, P310, P312, P314, P321, P322, P330, P332+P313, P333+P313, P362, P363, P372, P373, P380, P390, P391, P401, P403+P233, P404, P405, P501
NFPA 704 (fire diamond)	2 1 3
Flash point	129 °C (264 °F; 402 K)
Autoignition temperature	265 °C (509 °F; 538 K)
- Lethal dose or concentration (LD, LC)
LD_{50} (median dose)	408 mg/kg (oral, mouse); 59–70 mg/kg (intraperitoneal mouse, rat); 29 mg/kg (subcutaneous, rat)
Safety data sheet (SDS)	ICSC 0661

Related compounds
Related hydroxylammonium salts	Hydroxylammonium chloride; Hydroxylammonium nitrate; Hydroxylammonium sulfate
Related compounds	Ammonia; Water; Hydrazine; Hydrogen peroxide; N,O-Dimethylhydroxylamine; N,N-Diethylhydroxylamine; Hydroxylamine-O-sulfonic acid; Hydroxylphosphine
- Except where otherwise noted, data are given for materials in their standard state (at 25 °C [77 °F], 100 kPa). verify (what is ?) Infobox references

Hydroxylamine (also known as hydroxyammonia) is an inorganic compound with the chemical formula NH_{2}OH. The compound exists as hygroscopic colorless crystals. Hydroxylamine is almost always provided and used as either an aqueous solution or, more often, as one of its salts, such as hydroxylammonium sulfate, a water-soluble solid.

Hydroxylamine and its salts are consumed almost exclusively to produce Nylon-6. The oxidation of NH_{3} to hydroxylamine is a step in biological nitrification.

== History ==
Hydroxylamine was first prepared as hydroxylammonium chloride in 1865 by the German chemist Wilhelm Clemens Lossen (1838-1906); he reacted tin and hydrochloric acid in the presence of ethyl nitrate. It was first prepared in pure form in 1891 by the Dutch chemist Lobry de Bruyn and by the French chemist Léon Maurice Crismer (1858-1944). The coordination complex ZnCl_{2}(NH_{2}OH)_{2} (zinc dichloride di(hydroxylamine)), known as Crismer's salt, releases hydroxylamine upon heating.

== Structure ==
The crystal structure of hydroxylamine was first determined in 1955 under the direction of Nobel laureate William Lipscomb, although the positions of the hydrogen atoms were not localized at that time due to methodological limitations. In 2026 a high-precision crystal structure of hydroxylamine with unambiguous anisotropic refinement of hydrogen atoms was successfully obtained.

Hydroxylamine and its N-substituted derivatives are pyramidal at nitrogen, with bond angles very similar to those of amines. The most stable conformation of hydroxylamine has the NOH at the anti-relation to the nitrogen lone pair, seeming to minimize the repulsion between the nitrogen and oxygen lone pairs.

== Production ==
Hydroxylamine or its salts (salts containing hydroxylammonium cations [NH_{3}OH]^{+}) can be produced via several routes but only two are commercially viable. It is also produced naturally as discussed in a section on biochemistry.

=== From nitric oxide ===
NH_{2}OH is mainly produced as its sulfuric acid salt, hydroxylammonium sulfate ([NH_{3}OH]_{2}[SO_{4}]), by the hydrogenation of nitric oxide over platinum catalysts in the presence of sulfuric acid.

2 NO + 3 H_{2} + H_{2}SO_{4} → [NH_{3}OH]_{2}[SO_{4}]

=== Raschig process ===
Another route to NH_{2}OH is the Raschig process: aqueous ammonium nitrite is reduced by HSO^{−}_{3} and SO_{2} at 0 °C to yield a hydroxylamido-N,N-disulfonate anion:

[NH_{4}]^{+}[NO_{2}]^{−} + 2 SO_{2} + NH_{3} + H_{2}O → [NH_{4}]_{2}[HON(SO_{3})_{2}]

This ammonium hydroxylamine disulfonate anion is then hydrolyzed to give hydroxylammonium sulfate:

[NH_{4}]_{2}[HON(SO_{3})_{2}] + 2 H_{2}O → [HONH_{3}]_{2}SO_{4}

=== Other methods ===
Julius Tafel discovered that hydroxylamine hydrochloride or sulfate salts can be produced by electrolytic reduction of nitric acid with HCl or H_{2}SO_{4} respectively:

HNO_{3} + 3 H_{2} → NH_{2}OH + 2 H_{2}O

Hydroxylamine can also be produced by the reduction of nitrous acid or potassium nitrite with bisulfite:

HNO_{2} + 2 HSO^{−}_{3} → N(OH)(OSO^{−}_{2})_{2} + H_{2}O → NH(OH)(OSO^{−}_{2}) + HSO^{−}_{4}
NH(OH)(OSO^{−}_{2}) + [H_{3}O]^{+} → [NH_{3}OH]^{+} + HSO^{−}_{4} (100 °C, 1 h)

Hydrochloric acid disproportionates nitromethane to hydroxylamine hydrochloride and carbon monoxide via the hydroxamic acid.

A direct lab synthesis of hydroxylamine from molecular nitrogen in water plasma was demonstrated in 2024.

=== Isolation of hydroxylamine ===
Solid NH_{2}OH can be collected by treatment with liquid ammonia. Ammonium sulfate, [NH_{4}]_{2}SO_{4}, a side-product insoluble in liquid ammonia, is removed by filtration; the liquid ammonia is evaporated to give the desired product. The net reaction is:

2 NO^{−}_{2} + 4 SO_{2} + 6 H_{2}O + 6 NH_{3} → 4 SO^{2−}_{4} + 6 [NH_{4}]^{+} + 2 NH_{2}OH

Base, such as sodium butoxide, can be used to free the hydroxylamine from hydroxylammonium chloride:

[NH_{3}OH]Cl + NaO(CH_{2})_{3}CH_{3} → NH_{2}OH + NaCl + CH_{3}(CH_{2})_{3}OH

== Reactions ==
Hydroxylamine is a base with a pKa of 6.03:

NH_{3}OH^{+} ⇌ NH_{2}OH + H^{+}

Hydroxylamine reacts with alkylating agents usually at the nitrogen atom:

R−X + NH_{2}OH → R−NH−OH + HX

The reaction of NH_{2}OH with an aldehyde or ketone produces an oxime.

R_{2}C=O + NH_{2}OH → R_{2}C=N−OH + H_{2}O

This reaction can be useful in the purification of ketones and aldehydes: if hydroxylamine is added to an aldehyde or ketone in solution, an oxime forms, which generally precipitates from solution; heating the precipitate with aqueous acid then restores the original aldehyde or ketone.

NH_{2}OH reacts with chlorosulfonic acid to give hydroxylamine-O-sulfonic acid:

HO−S(=O)_{2}−Cl + NH_{2}OH → NH_{2}−O−S(=O)_{2}−OH + HCl

In aqueous solution, hydroxylamine is predicted to coexist with a zwitterionic tautomer, the amine oxide H_{3}N^{+}−O^{−} (ammonia oxide, azane oxide) The solvated ammonia oxide form has variously been estimated to be less stable by 0.9–3.5 kcal·mol^{−1}. It is absent from the gas phase, where the predicted stability gap is 27.6 kcal·mol^{−1}.

== Functional group ==
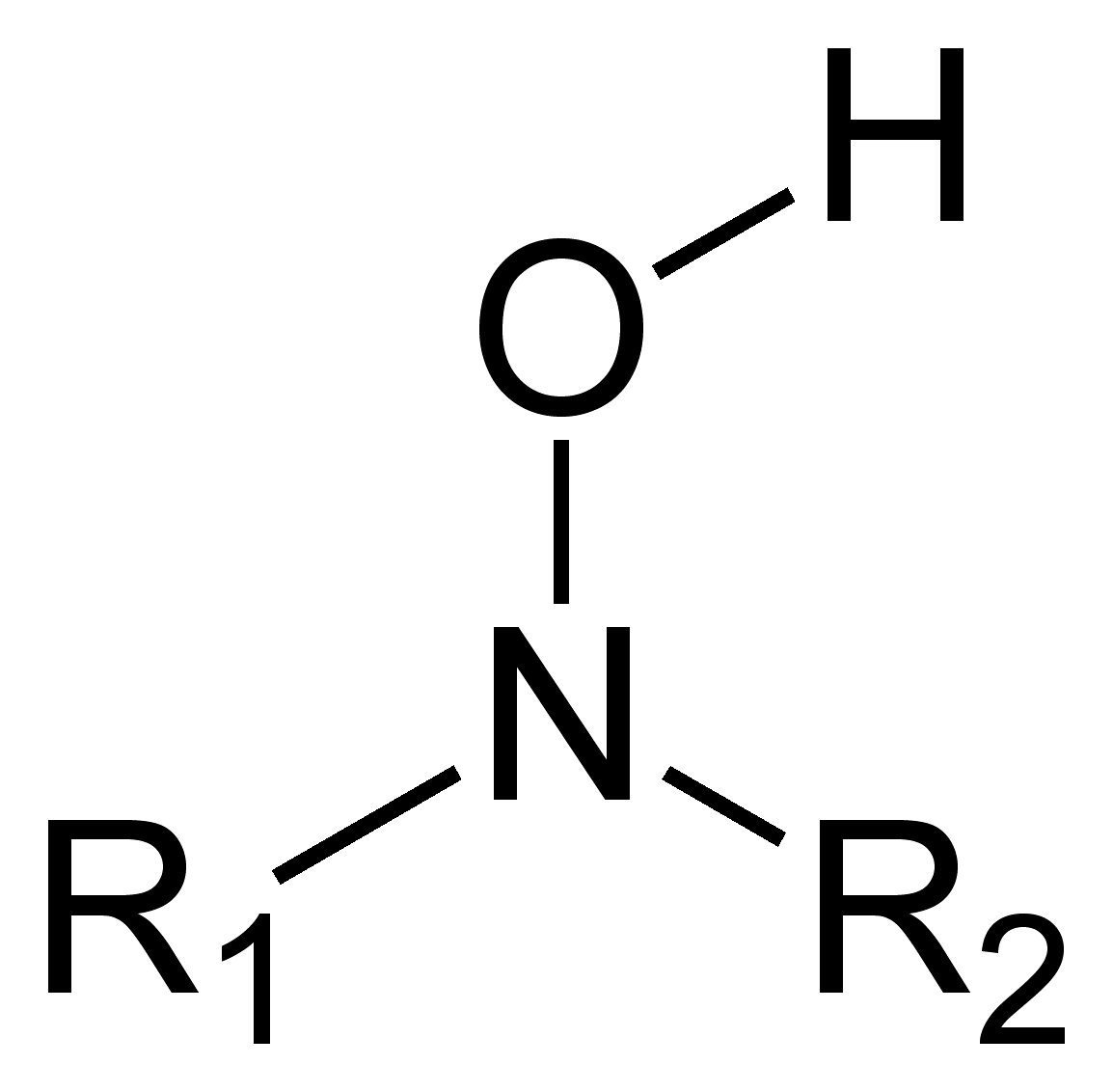
Secondary N,N-hydroxylamine schema

Hydroxylamine derivatives substituted in place of the hydroxyl or amine hydrogen are (respectively) called O- or N‑hydroxylamines. In general N‑hydroxylamines are more common. Examples are N‑tert‑butylhydroxylamine or the glycosidic bond in calicheamicin. N,O‑Dimethylhydroxylamine is a precursor to Weinreb amides.

Similarly to amines, one can distinguish hydroxylamines by their degree of substitution: primary, secondary and tertiary. When stored exposed to air for weeks, secondary hydroxylamines degrade to nitrones.

N‑organylhydroxylamines, R−NH−OH, where R is an organyl group, can be reduced to amines R−NH_{2}:

R−NH−OH (Zn, HCl) → R−NH_{2} + ZnO

Oximes such as dimethylglyoxime are also employed as ligands.

=== Synthesis ===
The hydrolysis of N-substituted oximes, hydroxamic acids, and nitrones easily provides hydroxylamines.

Alkylating of hydroxylamine or N-alkylhydroxylamines proceeds usually at nitrogen. One challenge is dialkylation when only monoalkylation is desired.

RNHOH + R'X → RR'NOH + HX

For O-alkylation of hydroxylamines, strong base such as sodium hydride is required to first deprotonate the OH group:

RNHOH + NaH → RNHONa + H_{2}
RNHONa + R'X → RNHOR' + NaX

Amine oxidation with benzoyl peroxide is a common method to synthesize hydroxylamines. Care must be taken to prevent over-oxidation to a nitrone. Other methods include:

- Hydrogenation of an oxime
- Amine oxide pyrolysis (the Cope reaction) or rearrangement

== Uses ==
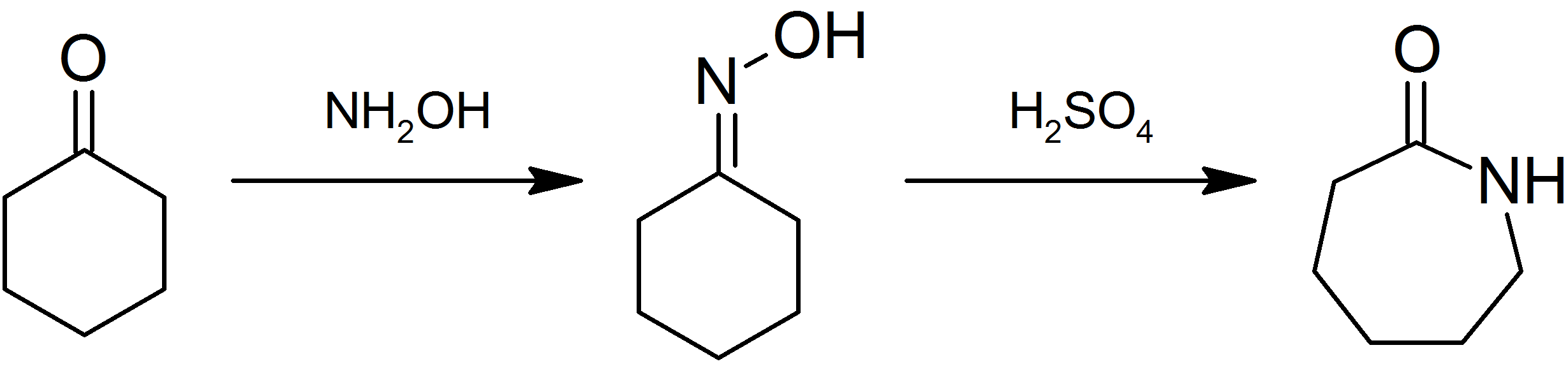
Conversion of cyclohexanone to caprolactam involving the Beckmann rearrangement.

Approximately 95% of hydroxylamine is used in the synthesis of cyclohexanone oxime, a precursor to Nylon 6. The treatment of this oxime with acid induces the Beckmann rearrangement to give caprolactam. The latter can then undergo a ring-opening polymerization to yield Nylon 6.

Synthesis of paracetamol, with a Beckmann Rearrangement as the final step

An alternative industrial synthesis of paracetamol developed by Hoechst–Celanese involves the conversion of ketone to a ketoxime with hydroxylamine.

Some non-chemical uses include removal of hair from animal hides and photographic developing solutions. In the semiconductor industry, hydroxylamine is often a component in the "resist stripper", which removes photoresist after lithography.

== Laboratory uses ==
Hydroxylamine and its salts are commonly used as reducing agents in myriad organic and inorganic reactions. They can also act as antioxidants for fatty acids.

High concentrations of hydroxylamine are used by biologists to introduce mutations by acting as a DNA nucleobase amine-hydroxylating agent. In is thought to mainly act via hydroxylation of cytidine to hydroxyaminocytidine, which is misread as thymidine, thereby inducing C:G to T:A transition mutations. But high concentrations or over-reaction of hydroxylamine in vitro are seemingly able to modify other regions of the DNA & lead to other types of mutations. This may be due to the ability of hydroxylamine to undergo uncontrolled free radical chemistry in the presence of trace metals and oxygen, in fact in the absence of its free radical effects Ernst Freese noted hydroxylamine was unable to induce reversion mutations of its C:G to T:A transition effect and even considered hydroxylamine to be the most specific mutagen known. Practically, it has been largely surpassed by more potent mutagens such as EMS, ENU, or nitrosoguanidine, but being a very small mutagenic compound with high specificity, it found some specialized uses such as mutation of DNA packed within bacteriophage capsids, and mutation of purified DNA in vitro.

Hydroxylamine can also be used to better characterize the nature of a post-translational modification onto proteins. For example, poly(ADP-Ribose) chains are sensitive to hydroxylamine when attached to glutamic or aspartic acids but not sensitive when attached to serines. Similarly, ubiquitin molecules bound to serines or threonines residues are sensitive to hydroxylamine, but those bound to lysine (isopeptide bond) are resistant.

== Biochemistry ==
In biological nitrification, the oxidation of NH_{3} to hydroxylamine is mediated by the ammonia monooxygenase (AMO). Hydroxylamine oxidoreductase (HAO) further oxidizes hydroxylamine to nitrite.

Cytochrome P460, an enzyme found in the ammonia-oxidizing bacteria Nitrosomonas europea, can convert hydroxylamine to nitrous oxide, a potent greenhouse gas.

Hydroxylamine can also be used to highly selectively cleave asparaginyl-glycine peptide bonds in peptides and proteins. It also bonds to and permanently disables (poisons) heme-containing enzymes. It is used as an irreversible inhibitor of the oxygen-evolving complex of photosynthesis on account of its similar structure to water.

== Safety and environmental concerns ==
Hydroxylamine is a skin irritant but is of low toxicity.

A detonator can easily explode aqueous solutions concentrated above 80% by weight, and even 50% solution might prove detonable if tested in bulk. In air, the combustion is rapid and complete:

4 NH_{2}OH + O_{2} → 2 N_{2} + 6 H_{2}O

Absent air, pure hydroxylamine requires stronger heating and the detonation does not compete combustion:

3 NH_{2}OH → N_{2} + NH_{3} + 3 H_{2}O

At least two factories dealing in hydroxylamine have been destroyed since 1999 with loss of life. It is known, however, that ferrous and ferric iron salts accelerate the decomposition of 50% NH_{2}OH solutions. Hydroxylamine and its derivatives are more safely handled in the form of salts.

It is an irritant to the respiratory tract, skin, eyes, and other mucous membranes. It may be absorbed through the skin, is harmful if swallowed, and is a possible mutagen.

== See also ==
- Amine
- Amino acid
