= Olin Raschig process =

Process for production of hydrazine

The Olin Raschig process is a chemical process for the production of hydrazine. The main steps in this process, patented by German chemist Friedrich Raschig in 1906 and one of three reactions named after him, are the formation of monochloramine from ammonia and hypochlorite, and the subsequent reaction of monochloramine with ammonia towards hydrazine. The process was further optimised and used by the Olin Corporation for the production of anhydrous hydrazine for aerospace applications.

== Process ==
The commercially used Olin Raschig process consists of the following steps:

First, sodium hypochlorite solution is mixed with a threefold excess of ammonia at 5 °C to give monochloramine. The primary reaction proceeds according to the idealised equation

NaOCl + NH_{3} → NH_{2}Cl + NaOH

The monochloramine solution is then added to a 30-fold excess of ammonia at 130 °C and elevated pressure, causing a second reaction

NH_{2}Cl + NH_{3} → N_{2}H_{4} + HCl

The hydrochloric acid and sodium hydroxide byproducts undergo a secondary reaction to release the byproducts of water and sodium chloride. The overall reaction is thus

NaOCl + 2NH_{3} → N_{2}H_{4} + NaCl + H_{2}O

Excess ammonia and sodium chloride are removed by distillation, followed by azeotropic distillation with aniline to remove water.
