= Ammonium nitrite =

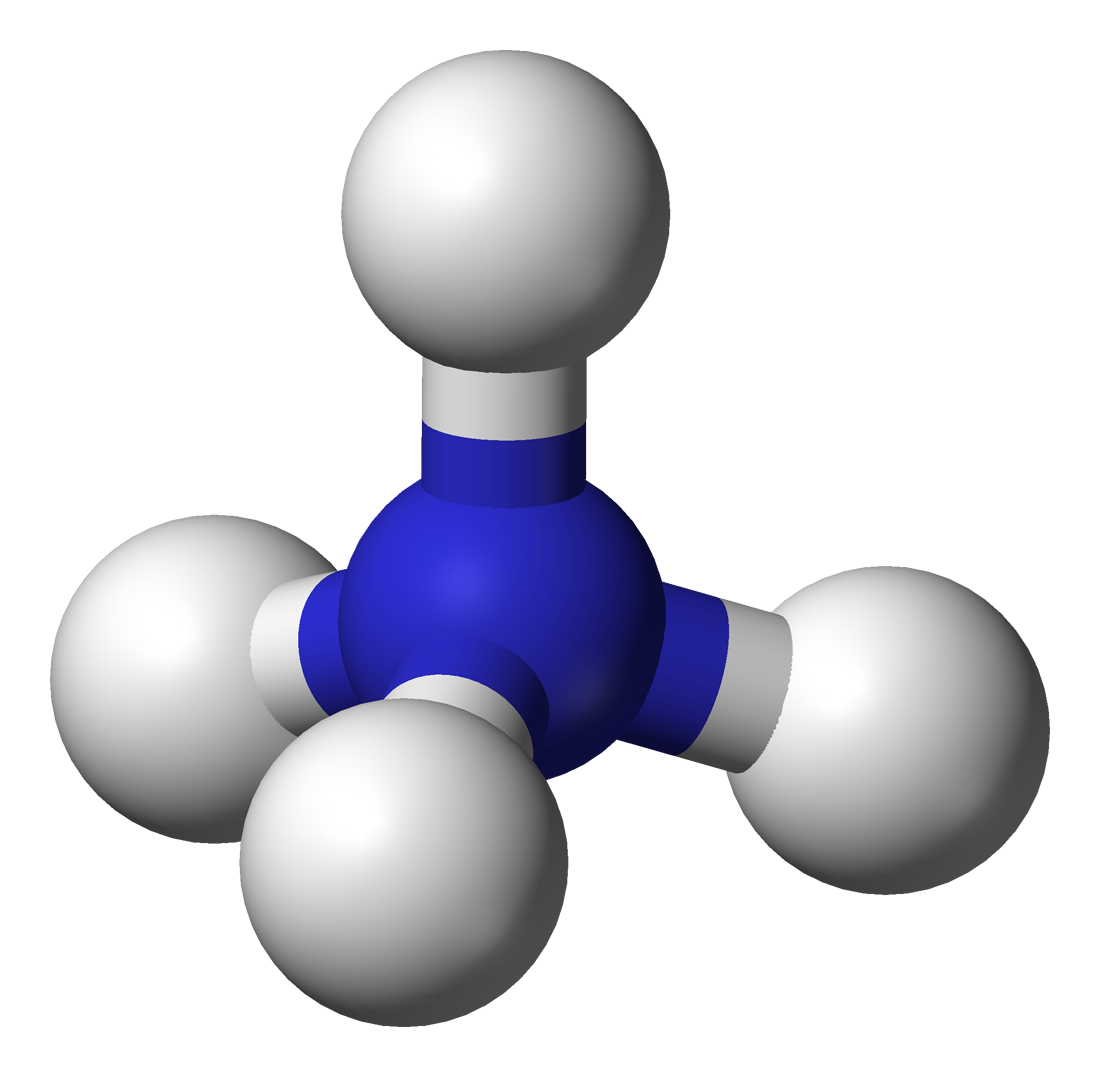
Ball-and-stick model of the ammonium cation
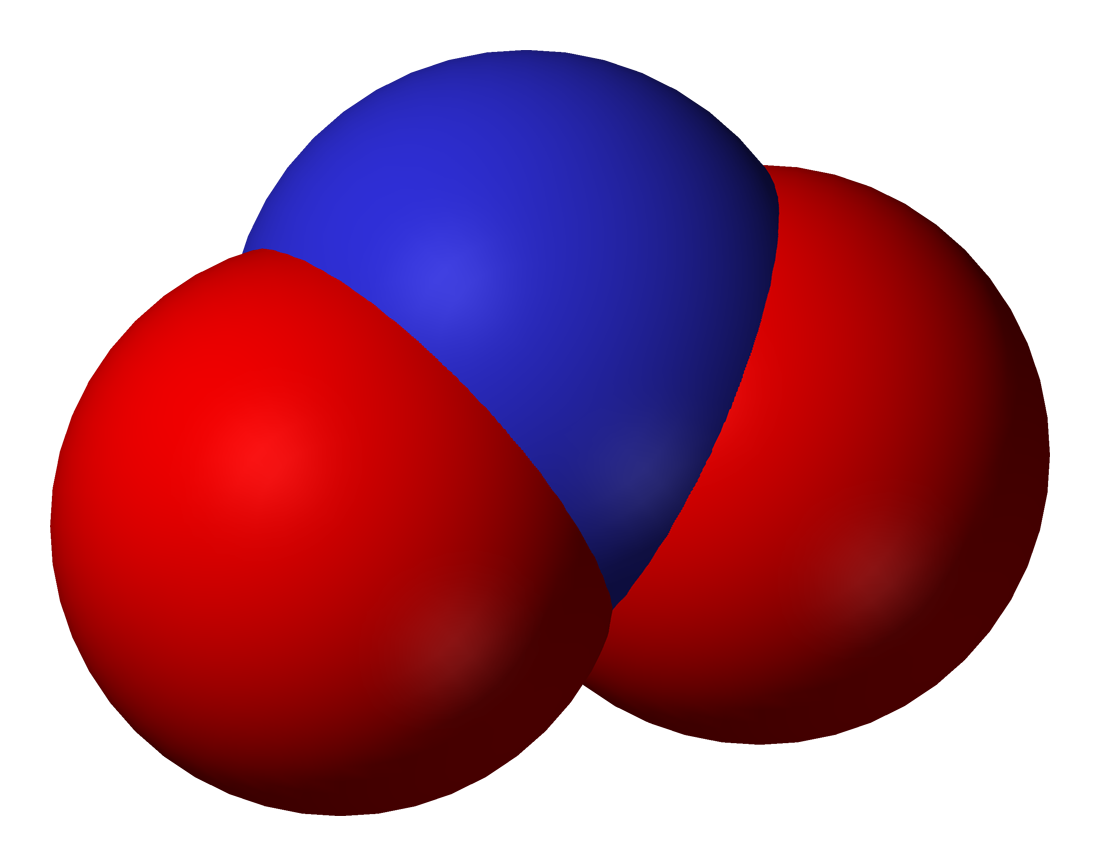
Ball-and-stick model of the nitrite anion

Names
- IUPAC name Ammonium nitrite

Identifiers
CAS Number	13446-48-5
3D model (JSmol)	Interactive image
ChemSpider	24223
ECHA InfoCard	100.033.257
EC Number	236-598-7
PubChem CID	26004
UNII	71ZQG69956
CompTox Dashboard (EPA)	DTXSID7065461
- InChI: InChI=1S/HNO2.H3N/c2-1-3;/h(H,2,3);1H3 Key: CAMXVZOXBADHNJ-UHFFFAOYSA-N; InChI=1/HNO2.H3N/c2-1-3;/h(H,2,3);1H3 Key: CAMXVZOXBADHNJ-UHFFFAOYAU
- SMILES: [O-]N=O.[NH4+]

Properties
Chemical formula	[NH_{4}]NO_{2}
Molar mass	64.044 g·mol^{−1}
Appearance	colorless or pale yellow crystals
Density	1.69 g/cm^{3}
Melting point	Decomposes
Solubility in water	118.3 g / 100mL

Explosive data
Shock sensitivity	Low
Friction sensitivity	Low
Detonation velocity	>1000 m/s

Hazards
- Occupational safety and health (OHS/OSH)
Main hazards	Explosive
- GHS labelling
Pictograms	(GHS01: Explosive) (GHS07: Exclamation mark)
Signal word	Danger
NFPA 704 (fire diamond)	2 0 3
Flash point	Non-flammable
Autoignition temperature	Non-flammable

Related compounds
Other anions	Ammonium nitrate
Other cations	Sodium nitrite
- Except where otherwise noted, data are given for materials in their standard state (at 25 °C [77 °F], 100 kPa). Infobox references

Ammonium nitrite is a chemical compound with the chemical formula [NH_{4}]NO_{2}. It is the ammonium salt of nitrous acid. It is composed of ammonium cations [NH_{4}]^{+} and nitrite anions NO^{−}_{2}. It is not used in pure isolated form since it is highly unstable and decomposes into water and nitrogen, even at room temperature.

== Preparation ==
Ammonium nitrite forms naturally in the air and can be prepared by the absorption of equal parts nitrogen dioxide and nitric oxide in aqueous ammonia.

It can also be synthesized by oxidizing ammonia with ozone or hydrogen peroxide, or in a precipitation reaction of barium or lead nitrite with ammonium sulfate, or silver nitrite with ammonium chloride, or ammonium perchlorate with potassium nitrite. The precipitate is filtered off and the solution concentrated. It forms colorless crystals which are soluble in water.

2 NH_{3} + O_{3} → [NH_{4}]NO_{2} + H_{2}O

== Physical and chemical properties ==
Ammonium nitrite may explode at a temperature of 60–70 °C, and will decompose quicker when dissolved in a concentrated aqueous solution, than in the form of a dry crystal. Even in room temperature the compound slowly decomposes into water and nitrogen:

[NH_{4}]NO_{2} → N_{2} + 2 H_{2}O

It decomposes when heated or in the presence of acid into water and nitrogen. Ammonium nitrite solution is stable at higher pH and lower temperature. If there is any decrease in pH lower than 7.0, it may lead to an explosion, since the nitrite can react to it. A safe pH can be maintained by adding an ammonia solution. The mole ratio of ammonium nitrite to ammonia must be above 10%.
