= Mercury(II) iodide =

- I−Hg−I

Names
- IUPAC name Mercury(II) iodide
- Other names Mercury diiodide Mercuric iodide Red mercury (α form only); Coccinite (α form only)

Identifiers
CAS Number	7774-29-0
3D model (JSmol)	Interactive image
ChEBI	CHEBI:49659
ChemSpider	22893
DrugBank	DB04445
ECHA InfoCard	100.028.976
EC Number	231-873-8
Gmelin Reference	277788
PubChem CID	24485
UNII	R03O05RB0P
CompTox Dashboard (EPA)	DTXSID9042124
- InChI: InChI=1S/Hg.2HI/h;2*1H/q+2;;/p-2 Key: YFDLHELOZYVNJE-UHFFFAOYSA-L; InChI=1/Hg.2HI/h;2*1H/q+2;;/p-2 Key: YFDLHELOZYVNJE-NUQVWONBAE
- SMILES: I[Hg]I

Properties
Chemical formula	HgI_{2}
Molar mass	454.40 g/mol
Appearance	orange-red powder
Odor	odorless
Density	6.36 g/cm^{3}
Melting point	259 °C (498 °F; 532 K)
Boiling point	350 °C (662 °F; 623 K)
Solubility in water	6 mg/100 mL
Solubility product (K_{sp})	2.9×10^{−29}
Solubility	slightly soluble in alcohol, ether, acetone, chloroform, ethyl acetate, CS_{2}, olive oil, castor oil; soluble in excess potassium iodide forming soluble complex K_{2}[HgI_{4}](Potassium tetraiodomercurate(II)), also known as Nessler's reagent
Magnetic susceptibility (χ)	−128.6·10^{−6} cm^{3}/mol
Refractive index (n_{D})	2.455

Structure
Crystal structure	Tetrahedral

Pharmacology
ATC code	D08AK30 (WHO)

Hazards
- GHS labelling
Pictograms	(GHS06: Toxic) (GHS08: Health hazard) (GHS09: Environmental hazard)
Signal word	Danger
Hazard statements	H300, H310, H330, H373, H410
Precautionary statements	P260, P262, P264, P270, P271, P273, P280, P284, P301+P310, P302+P350, P304+P340, P310, P314, P320, P321, P330, P361, P363, P391, P403+P233, P405, P501
NFPA 704 (fire diamond)	4 0 0
Flash point	Non-flammable

Related compounds
Other anions	Mercury(II) fluoride Mercury(II) chloride Mercury(II) bromide
Other cations	Zinc iodide Cadmium iodide
Related compounds	Mercury(I) iodide
- Except where otherwise noted, data are given for materials in their standard state (at 25 °C [77 °F], 100 kPa). verify (what is ?) Infobox references

Mercury(II) iodide is the inorganic compound with the molecular formula HgI_{2}. The compound has attracted interest because it exhibits thermochromism, i.e. its color changes markedly with temperature. It is typically produced synthetically but can also be found in nature as the extremely rare mineral coccinite. Unlike the related mercury(II) chloride, it is poorly soluble in water (<100 ppm).

== Production ==
Mercury(II) iodide precipitates when an aqueous solution of potassium iodide is added to an aqueous solution of mercury(II) chloride.

HgCl_{2} + 2 KI → HgI_{2} + 2 KCl

== Properties ==
Mercury(II) iodide displays thermochromism; when heated above 127 °C (400 K) it undergoes a phase transition, from the red alpha crystalline form to a pale yellow beta form. As the sample cools, it gradually reacquires its original colour. It has often been used for thermochromism demonstrations. A third form, which is orange, is also known; this can be formed by recrystallisation and is also metastable, eventually converting back to the red alpha form. The various forms can exist in a diverse range of crystal structures and as a result mercury(II) iodide possesses a surprisingly complex phase diagram.

== Structure ==
Mercuric iodide is a linear monomer in solution. Upon crystallization, it forms various polymorphs.

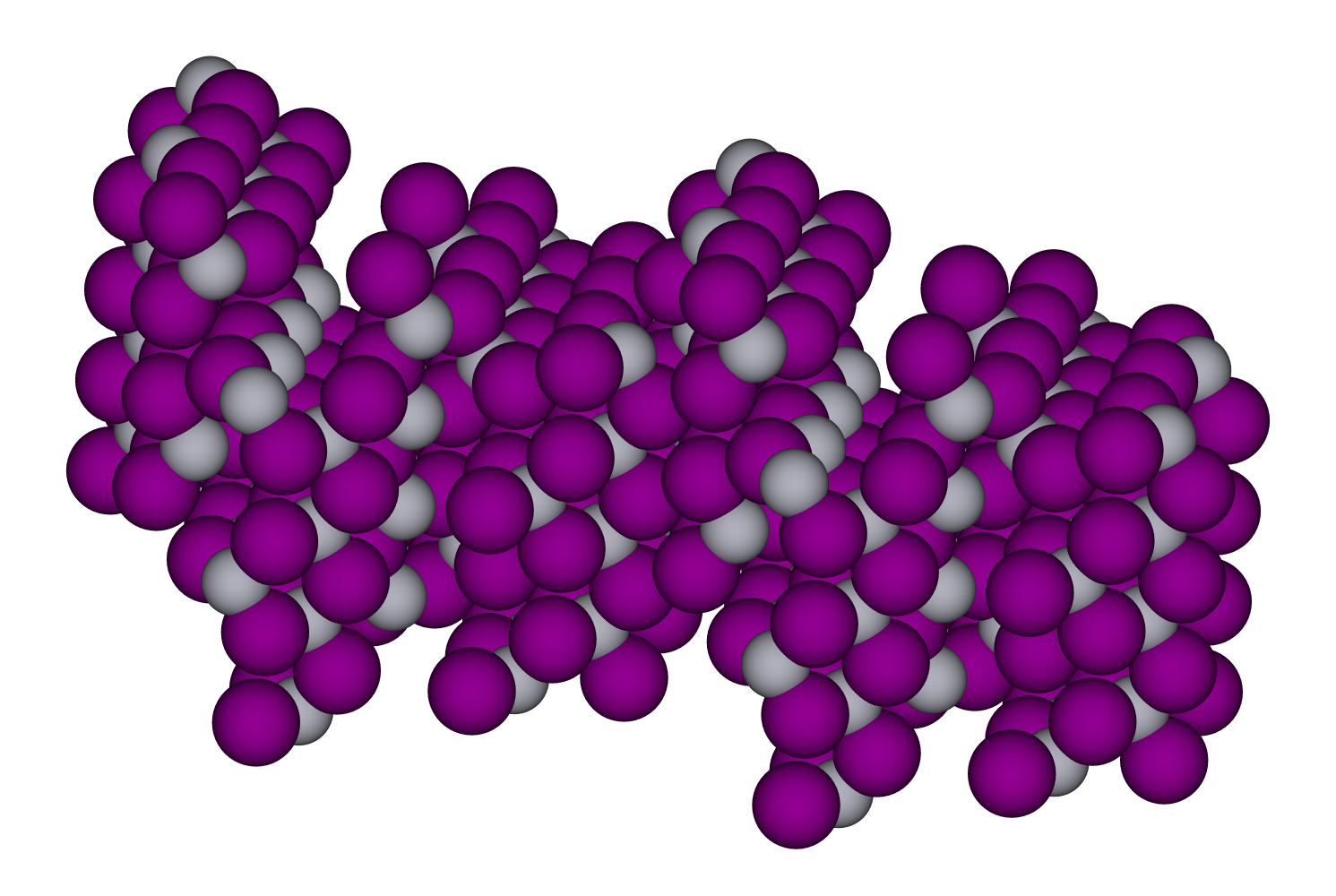
Mercury(II) iodide (α form)

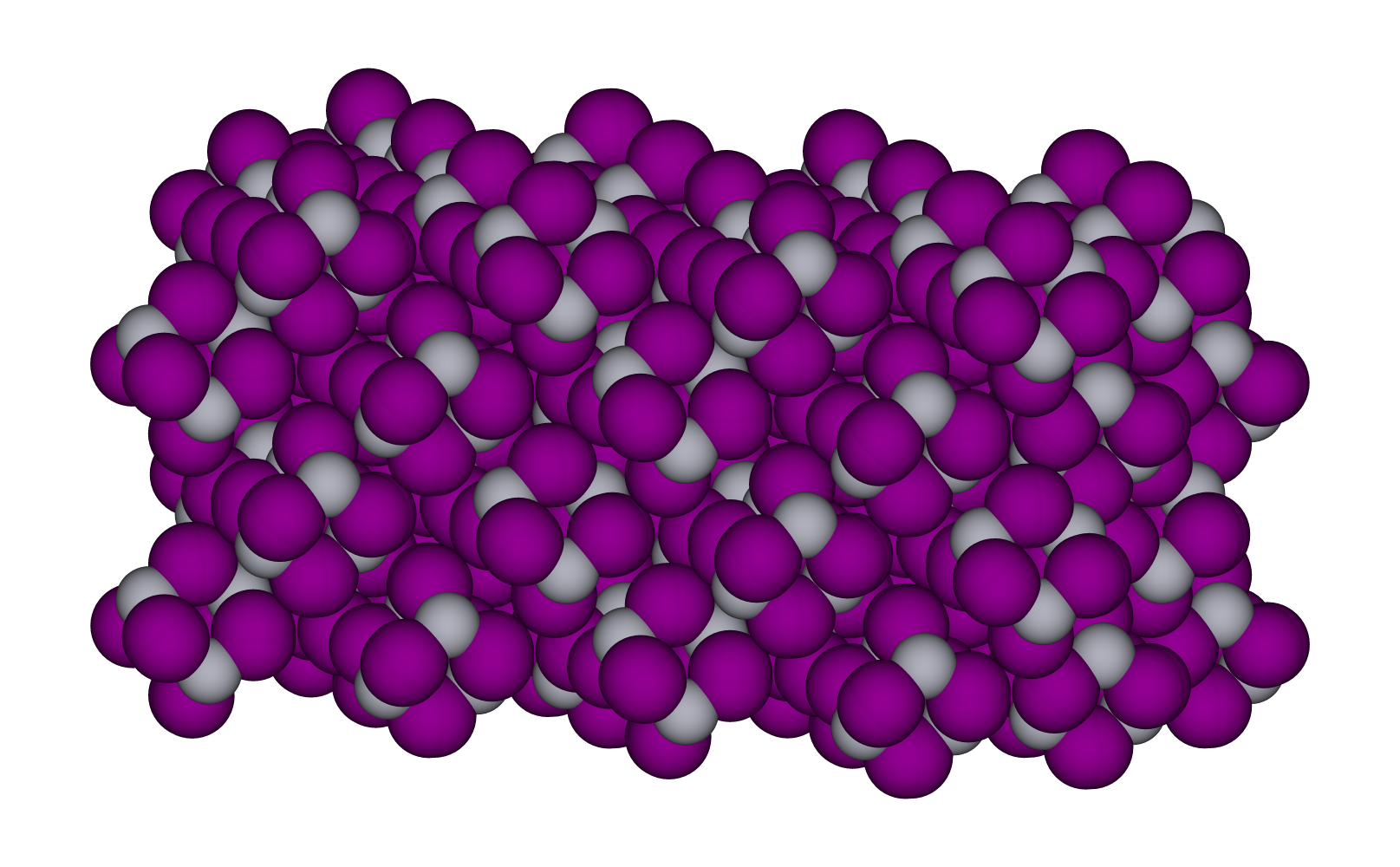
Mercury(II) iodide (β form)

== Uses ==
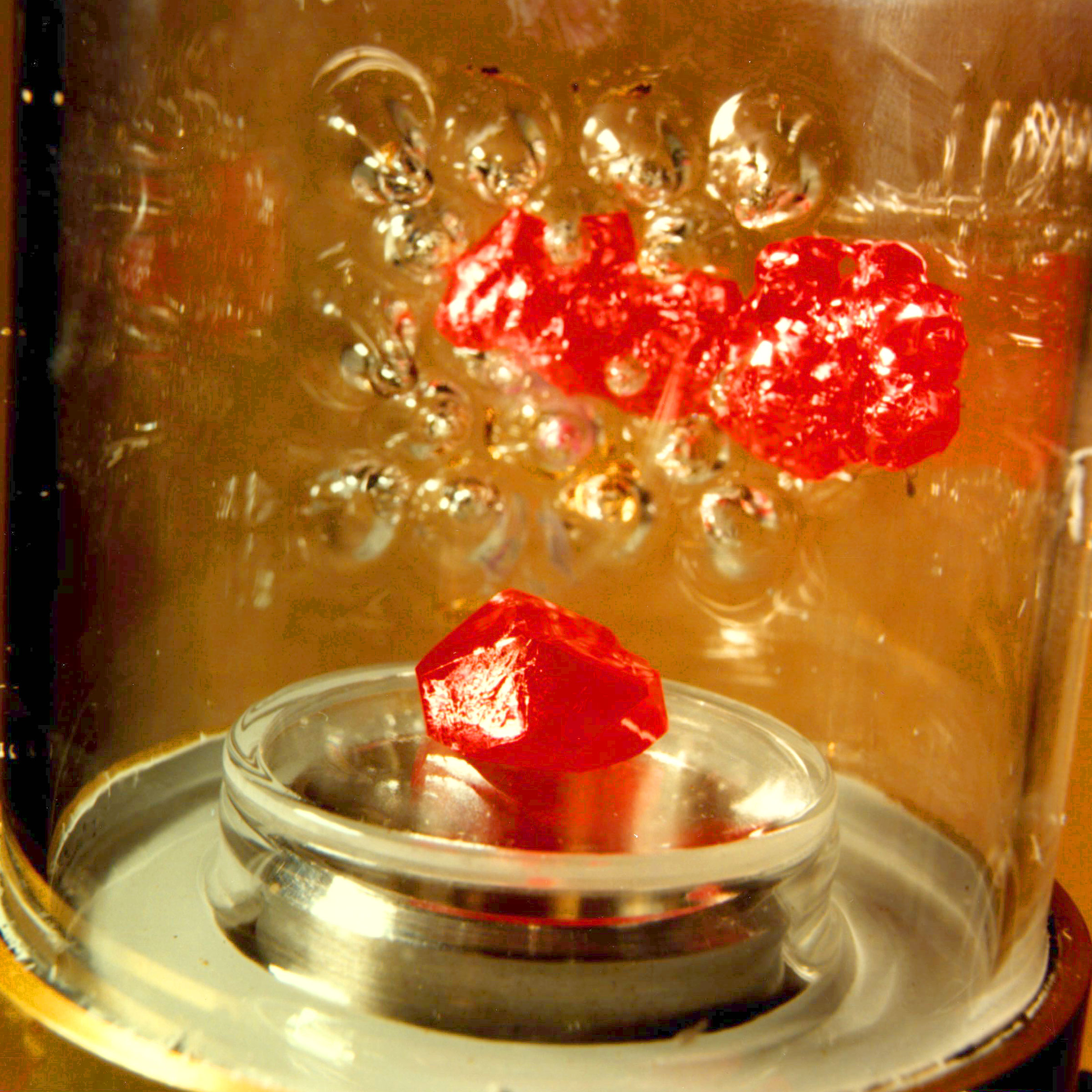
Mercury(II) iodide crystals grown in Spacelab

Mercury(II) iodide is used for preparation of Nessler's reagent, used for detection of presence of ammonia.

Mercury(II) iodide is a semiconductor material, used in some x-ray and gamma ray detection and imaging devices operating at room temperatures.

In veterinary medicine, mercury(II) iodide is used in blister ointments in exostoses, bursal enlargement, etc.

It can appear as a precipitate in many reactions.

== See also ==
- Mercury(I) iodide, Hg_{2}I_{2}
