= Caesium cadmium chloride =

Names
- IUPAC name Caesium cadmium chloride
- Other names: Caesium trichlorocadmate; Caesium chlorocadmate; Caesium trichlorocadmate(II)

Identifiers
CAS Number	13845-08-4
3D model (JSmol)	Interactive image
PubChem CID	159356594
- InChI: InChI=1S/Cd.3ClH.Cs/h;3*1H;/q+2;;;;+1/p-3 Key: LHZPOBUPLFKLBV-UHFFFAOYSA-K
- SMILES: [Cd+2]([Cl-])([Cl-])[Cl-].[Cs+]; [Cs+].[Cl-][Cd+2]([Cl-])[Cl-]

Properties
Chemical formula	CdCl_{3}Cs
Molar mass	351.67 g·mol^{−1}
Appearance	White or colourless solid

Structure
Crystal structure	hexagonal
Space group	P6_{3}/mmc
Lattice constant	a = 7.403, c = 18.406
- Except where otherwise noted, data are given for materials in their standard state (at 25 °C [77 °F], 100 kPa). verify (what is ?) Infobox references

Caesium cadmium chloride (CsCdCl_{3}) is a synthetic crystalline material. It belongs to the AMX_{3} group (where A=alkali metal, M=bivalent metal, X=halogen ions). It crystallizes in a hexagonal space group P6_{3}/mmc with unit cell lengths a = 7.403 Å and c = 18.406 Å, with one cadmium ion having D_{3d} symmetry and the other having C_{3v} symmetry.

It is formed when an aqueous solution of hydrochloric acid containing an equimolar solution of caesium chloride and cadmium chloride.
