= Ammonium hexabromomercurate(II) =

Names
- Other names Ammonium hexabromomercurate

Identifiers
3D model (JSmol)	Interactive image
- InChI: InChI=1S/6Br.Hg.4H3N/h;;;;;;;4*1H3/q6*-1;+2;;;;/p+4
- SMILES: [NH4+].[NH4+].[NH4+].[NH4+].[Br-][Hg+2]([Br-])([Br-])([Br-])([Br-])[Br-]

Properties
Chemical formula	Br_{6}H_{16}HgN_{4}
Molar mass	752.172 g·mol^{−1}
Appearance	crystals
Density	3.2 g/cm^{3}
Solubility in water	soluble
- Except where otherwise noted, data are given for materials in their standard state (at 25 °C [77 °F], 100 kPa). Infobox references

Ammonium hexabromomercurate(II) is a chemical compound with the chemical formula (NH_{4})_{4}[HgBr_{6}].

== Synthesis ==
Heating of a mixture of mercury(II) bromide and ammonium bromide:

HgBr_{2} + 4NH_{4}Br → (NH_{4})_{4}[HgBr_{6}]

== Physical properties ==
The compound forms black crystals of tetragonal system, space group P4/mnc, cell parameters: a = 0.925560 nm, c = 0.88657 nm, Z = 2.

At a temperature of 200 K, the compound enters a phase of the monoclinic system, space group P2_{1}/n. At 250 K, it forms crystals of the orthorhombic system, space group Pnnm.
