= Cadmium fluoride =

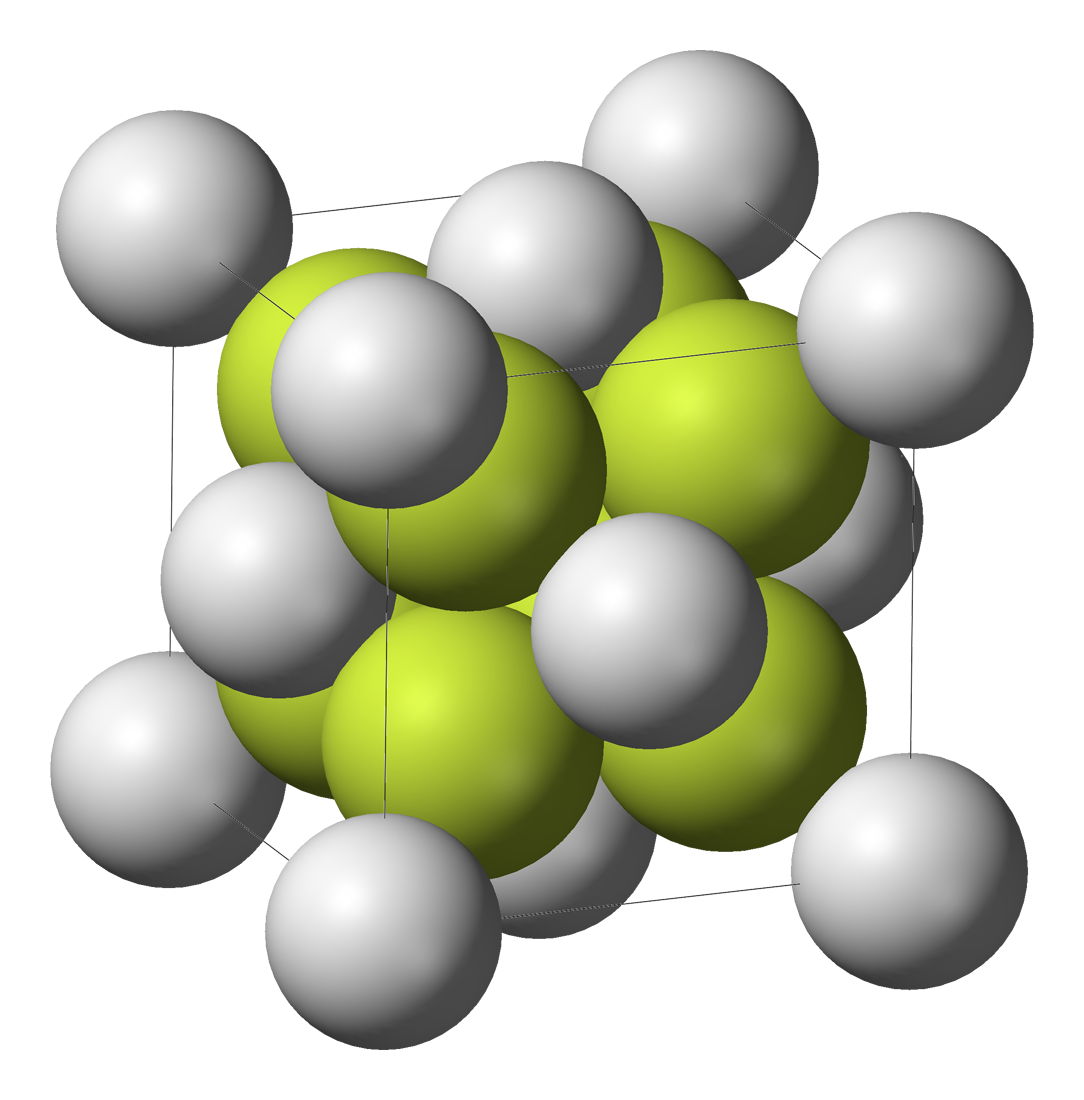

Names
- IUPAC name Cadmium fluoride
- Other names Cadmium(II) fluoride, Cadmium difluoride

Identifiers
CAS Number	7790-79-6
3D model (JSmol)	Interactive image
ChemSpider	23036
ECHA InfoCard	100.029.293
EC Number	232-222-0
PubChem CID	24634; 71356118 dihydrate
UNII	M0975E7Z8Z
CompTox Dashboard (EPA)	DTXSID6064878
- InChI: InChI=1S/Cd.2FH/h;2*1H/q+2;;/p-2 Key: LVEULQCPJDDSLD-UHFFFAOYSA-L; InChI=1/Cd.2FH/h;2*1H/q+2;;/p-2 Key: LVEULQCPJDDSLD-NUQVWONBAG
- SMILES: F[Cd]F

Properties
Chemical formula	CdF_{2}
Molar mass	150.41 g/mol
Appearance	grey or white-grey crystals
Density	6.33 g/cm^{3}, solid
Melting point	1,110 °C (2,030 °F; 1,380 K)
Boiling point	1,748 °C (3,178 °F; 2,021 K)
Solubility in water	4.35 g/100 mL
Solubility product (K_{sp})	0.00644
Solubility	soluble in acid insoluble in ethanol alcohol and liquid ammonia
Magnetic susceptibility (χ)	−40.6·10^{−6} cm^{3}/mol

Structure
Crystal structure	Fluorite (cubic), cF12
Space group	Fm3̅m, No. 225

Thermochemistry
Std enthalpy of formation (Δ_{f}H^{⦵}_{298})	−167.39 ± 0.23 kcal. mole-1 at 298.15 (K, C?)
Gibbs free energy (Δ_{f}G^{⦵})	−155.4 ± 0.3 kcal. mole-1 at 298.15 (K, C?)

Hazards
- GHS labelling
Pictograms	(GHS06: Toxic) (GHS08: Health hazard) (GHS09: Environmental hazard)
Signal word	Danger
Hazard statements	H301, H330, H340, H350, H360, H372, H410
Precautionary statements	P201, P202, P260, P264, P270, P271, P273, P281, P284, P301+P310, P304+P340, P308+P313, P310, P314, P320, P321, P330, P391, P403+P233, P405, P501
- NIOSH (US health exposure limits)
PEL (Permissible)	[1910.1027] TWA 0.005 mg/m^{3} (as Cd)
REL (Recommended)	Ca
IDLH (Immediate danger)	Ca [9 mg/m^{3} (as Cd)]

Related compounds
Other anions	Cadmium chloride, Cadmium bromide Cadmium iodide
Other cations	Zinc fluoride, Mercury(II) fluoride, Copper(II) fluoride, Silver(II) fluoride, Calcium fluoride, Magnesium fluoride
- Except where otherwise noted, data are given for materials in their standard state (at 25 °C [77 °F], 100 kPa). verify (what is ?) Infobox references

Cadmium fluoride (CdF_{2}) is a mostly water-insoluble source of cadmium used in oxygen-sensitive applications, such as the production of metallic alloys.

== Preparation ==
Cadmium fluoride is prepared by the reaction of gaseous fluorine or hydrogen fluoride with cadmium metal or its salts, such as the chloride, oxide, or sulfate.

It may also be obtained by dissolving cadmium carbonate in 40% hydrofluoric acid solution, evaporating the solution and drying in a vacuum at 150 °C.

Another method of preparing it is to mix cadmium chloride and ammonium fluoride solutions, followed by crystallization. The insoluble cadmium fluoride is filtered from solution.

Cadmium fluoride has also been prepared by reacting fluorine with cadmium sulfide. This reaction happens very quickly and forms nearly pure fluoride at much lower temperatures than other reactions used.

== Physical properties ==
The standard enthalpy has been found to be −167.39 kcal·mole^{−1} and the Gibbs energy of formation has been found to be −155.4 kcal·mole^{−1}. The heat of sublimation was determined to be 76 kcal. mole^{−1}

== Uses ==
In extremely low concentrations (ppm), this and other fluoride compounds are used in limited medical treatment protocols.

Fluoride compounds also have significant uses in synthetic organic chemistry.

=== Electronic conductor ===
CdF_{2} can be transformed into an electronic conductor when doped with certain rare earth elements, including yttrium; and treated with cadmium vapor under high temperature conditions. This process creates blue crystals with varying absorption coefficients depending on the concentrations of the dopant. A proposed mechanism explains that the conductivity of these crystals can be explained by a reaction of Cd atoms with interstitial F^{−} ions. This creates more CdF_{2} molecules and releases electrons which are weakly bonded to trivalent dopant ions resulting in n-type conductivity and a hydrogenic donor level.

== Safety ==
Cadmium fluoride, like all cadmium compounds, is toxic and should be used with care.

Cadmium fluoride can cause potential health issues if it is not handled properly. It can cause irritation to the skin and the eyes, so gloves and protective eyewear are advised. The MSDS, or Material Safety Data Sheet, also includes warnings for ingestion and inhalation. Under acidic conditions, at high temperatures, and in moist environments, hydrogen fluoride and cadmium vapors may be released into the air. Inhalation may cause irritation of the respiratory system as well as congestion, fluorosis, and even pulmonary edema in extreme cases. Cadmium fluoride also has the same potential hazards caused by cadmium and fluoride.
