= Zinc chloride =

Chemical compound

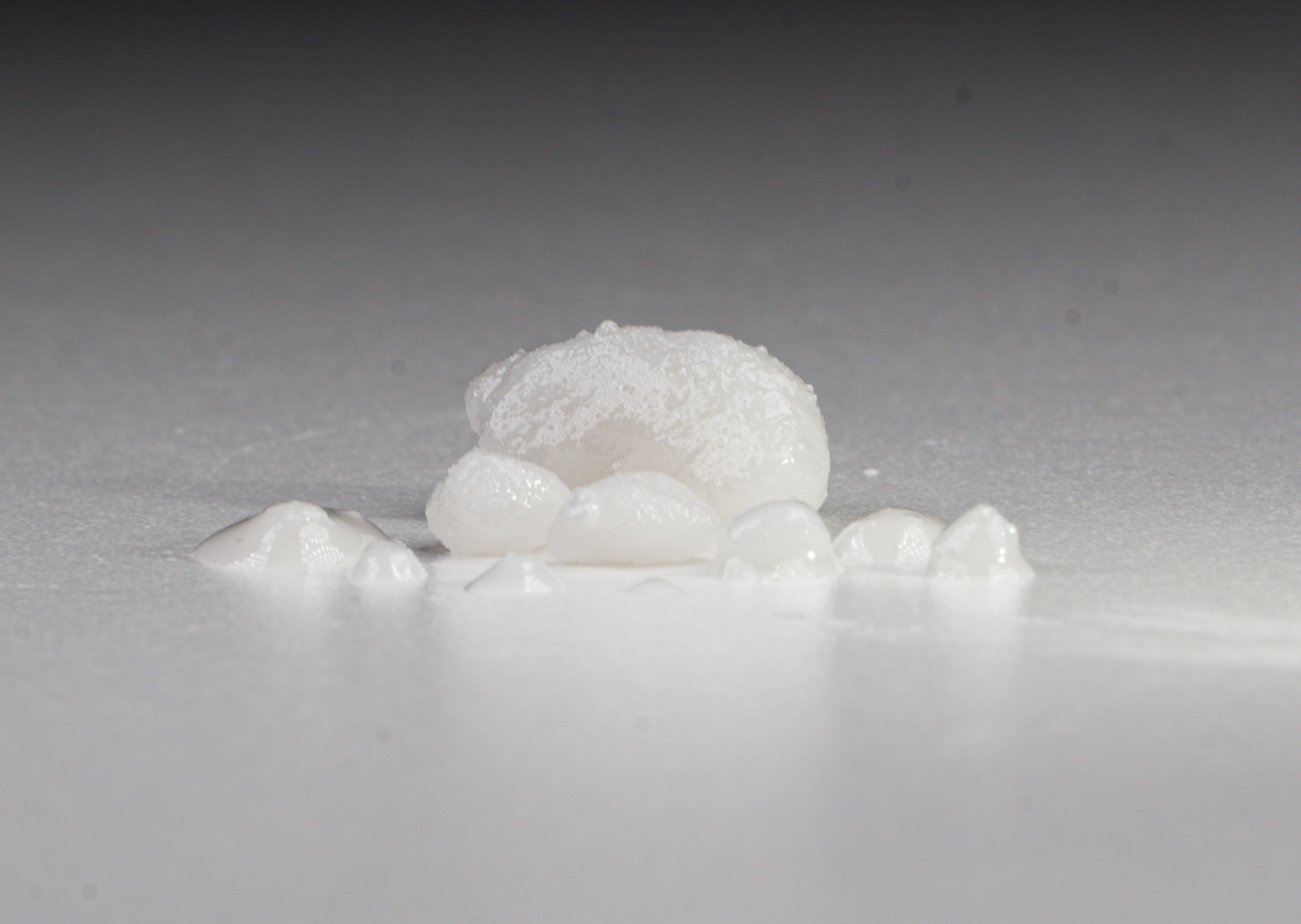
- Anhydrous

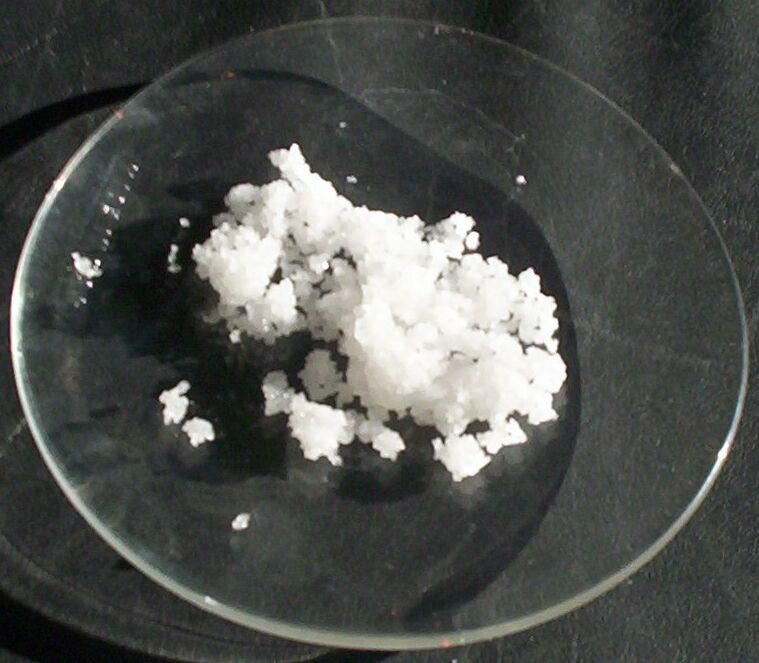
- Zinc chloride hydrate Monohydrate

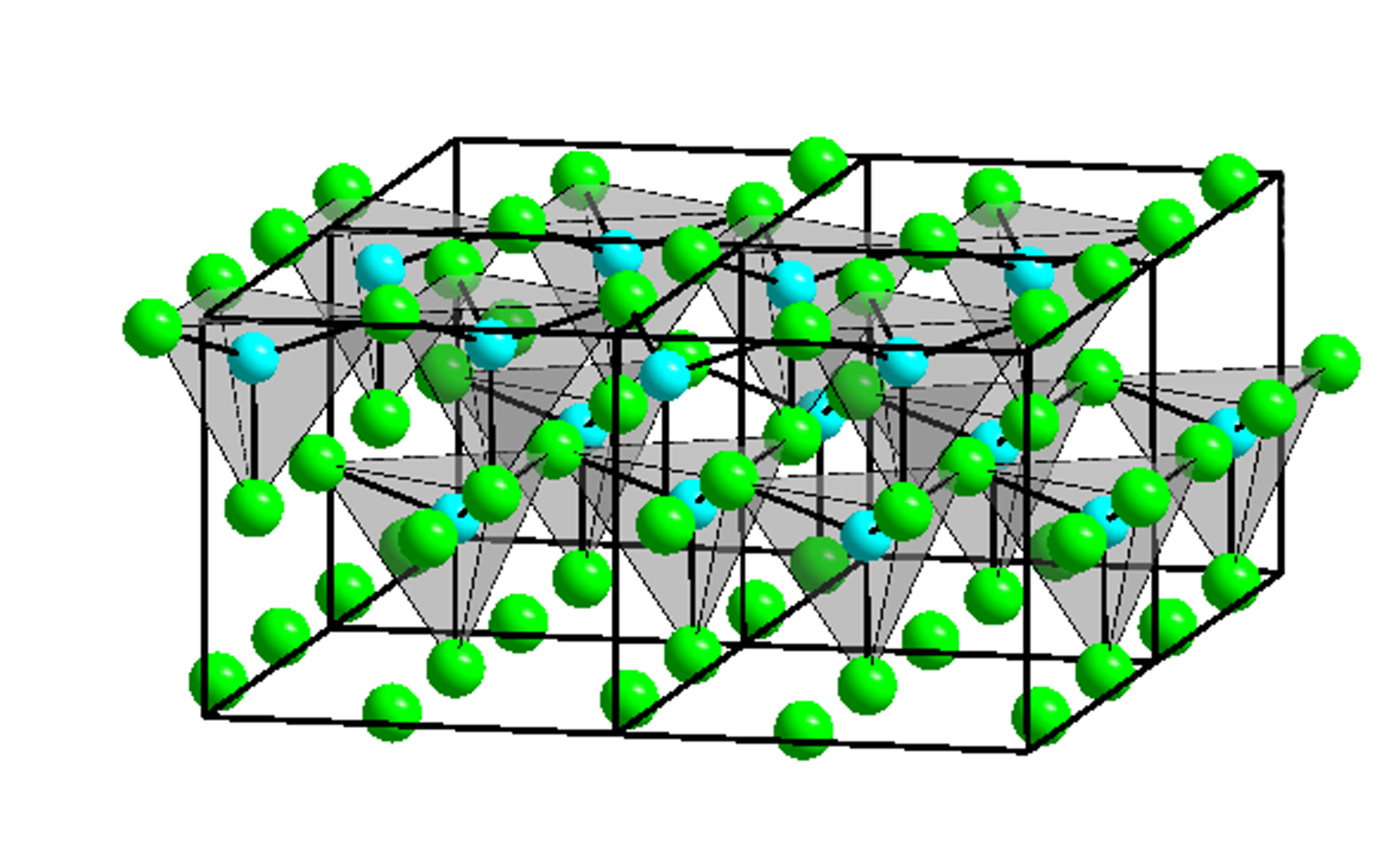

Names
- IUPAC name Zinc chloride
- Other names: Butter of zinc; Neutral zinc chloride (1:2); Zinc bichloride (archaic); Zinc(II) chloride

Identifiers
CAS Number	7646-85-7 Anhydrous; 29426-92-4 Tetrahydrate; 21351-91-7 Mixed hydrate
3D model (JSmol)	Interactive image
ChEBI	CHEBI:49976
ChEMBL	ChEMBL1200679
ChemSpider	5525
DrugBank	DB14533
ECHA InfoCard	100.028.720
EC Number	231-592-0
PubChem CID	3007855
RTECS number	ZH1400000
UNII	86Q357L16B
UN number	2331
CompTox Dashboard (EPA)	DTXSID2035013
- InChI: InChI=1S/2ClH.Zn/h2*1H;/q;;+2/p-2 Key: JIAARYAFYJHUJI-UHFFFAOYSA-L; InChI=1/2ClH.Zn/h2*1H;/q;;+2/p-2 Key: JIAARYAFYJHUJI-NUQVWONBAB
- SMILES: Cl[Zn]Cl

Properties
Chemical formula	ZnCl_{2}
Molar mass	136.28 g·mol^{−1}
Appearance	White hygroscopic and very deliquescent crystalline solid
Odor	odorless
Density	2.907 g/cm^{3}
Melting point	290 °C (554 °F; 563 K)
Boiling point	732 °C (1,350 °F; 1,005 K)
Solubility in water	432.0 g/100 g (25 °C); 615 g/100 g (100 °C)
Solubility	soluble in ethanol, glycerol and acetone
Solubility in ethanol	430.0 g/100 ml
Magnetic susceptibility (χ)	−65.0·10^{−6} cm^{3}/mol

Structure
Coordination geometry	Tetrahedral, linear in the gas phase

Pharmacology
ATC code	B05XA12 (WHO)

Hazards
- Occupational safety and health (OHS/OSH)
Main hazards	Oral toxicity, irritant
- GHS labelling
Pictograms	(GHS05: Corrosive) (GHS07: Exclamation mark) (GHS09: Environmental hazard)
Signal word	Danger
Hazard statements	H302, H314, H410
Precautionary statements	P273, P280, P301+P330+P331, P305+P351+P338, P308+P310
NFPA 704 (fire diamond)	3 0 0
- Lethal dose or concentration (LD, LC)
LD_{50} (median dose)	350 mg/kg (rat, oral); 350 mg/kg (mouse, oral); 200 mg/kg (guinea pig, oral); 1100 mg/kg (rat, oral); 1250 mg/kg (mouse, oral)
LC_{50} (median concentration)	1260 mg/m^{3} (rat, 30 min); 1180 mg-min/m^{3}
- NIOSH (US health exposure limits)
PEL (Permissible)	TWA 1 mg/m^{3} (fume)
REL (Recommended)	TWA 1 mg/m^{3} ST 2 mg/m^{3} (fume)
IDLH (Immediate danger)	50 mg/m^{3} (fume)
Safety data sheet (SDS)	External SDS

Related compounds
Other anions	Zinc fluoride; Zinc bromide; Zinc iodide
Other cations	Cadmium chloride; Mercury(II) chloride
- Except where otherwise noted, data are given for materials in their standard state (at 25 °C [77 °F], 100 kPa). verify (what is ?) Infobox references

Zinc chloride is an inorganic chemical compound with the formula ZnCl_{2}·nH_{2}O, with n ranging from 0 to 4.5, forming hydrates. Zinc chloride, anhydrous and its hydrates, are colorless or white crystalline solids, and are highly soluble in water. Five hydrates of zinc chloride are known, as well as four polymorphs of anhydrous zinc chloride.

All forms of zinc chloride are deliquescent. They can usually be produced by the reaction of zinc or its compounds with some form of hydrogen chloride. Anhydrous zinc compound is a Lewis acid, readily forming complexes with a variety of Lewis bases. Zinc chloride finds wide application in textile processing, metallurgical fluxes, chemical synthesis of organic compounds, such as benzaldehyde, and processes to produce other compounds of zinc.

== History ==
Zinc chloride has long been known but currently practiced industrial applications all evolved in the latter half of 20th century.

An amorphous cement formed from aqueous zinc chloride and zinc oxide was first investigated in 1855 by Stanislas Sorel. Sorel later went on to investigate the related magnesium oxychloride cement, which bears his name.

Dilute aqueous zinc chloride was used as a disinfectant under the name "Burnett's Disinfecting Fluid". From 1839 Sir William Burnett promoted its use as a disinfectant as well as a wood preservative. The Royal Navy conducted trials into its use as a disinfectant in the late 1840s, including during the cholera epidemic of 1849; and at the same time experiments were conducted into its preservative properties as applicable to the shipbuilding and railway industries. Burnett had some commercial success with his eponymous fluid. Following his death however, its use was largely superseded by that of carbolic acid and other proprietary products.

== Structure and properties ==
Unlike other metal dichlorides, zinc dichloride adopts several crystalline forms (polymorphs). Four polymorph are known: α, β, γ, and δ. Each features Zn^{2+} centers surrounded in a tetrahedral manner by four chloride ligands.

Form	Crystal system	Pearson symbol	Space group	No.	a (nm)	b (nm)	c (nm)	Z	Density (g/cm^{3})
α	tetragonal	tI12	I4̅2d	122	0.5398	0.5398	0.64223	4	3.00
β	tetragonal	tP6	P4_{2}/nmc	137	0.3696	0.3696	1.071	2	3.09
γ	monoclinic	mP36	P2_{1}/c	14	0.654	1.131	1.23328	12	2.98
δ	orthorhombic	oP12	Pna2_{1}	33	0.6125	0.6443	0.7693	4	2.98

Here a, b, and c are lattice constants, Z is the number of structure units per unit cell, and ρ is the density calculated from the structure parameters.

The orthorhombic form (δ) rapidly changes to another polymorph upon exposure to the atmosphere. A possible explanation is that the OH^{−} ions originating from the absorbed water facilitate the rearrangement. Rapid cooling of molten ZnCl_{2} gives a glass.

Molten ZnCl_{2} has a high viscosity at its melting point and a comparatively low electrical conductivity, which increases markedly with temperature. As indicated by a Raman scattering study, the viscosity is explained by the presence of polymers. Neutron scattering study indicated the presence of tetrahedral ZnCl_{4} centers, which requires aggregation of ZnCl_{2} monomers as well.

=== Hydrates ===
A variety of hydrated zinc chloride are known: ZnCl_{2}(H_{2}O)_{n} with n = 1, 1.33, 2.5, 3, and 4.5. The 1.33-hydrate, previously thought to be the hemitrihydrate, consists of trans-Zn(H_{2}O)_{4}Cl_{2} centers with the chloro ligands bridging to tetrachlorozincate ([ZnCl_{4}]^{2-}) groups, present in 1:2 ratio. The hemipentahydrate, structurally formulated [Zn(H_{2}O)_{5}][ZnCl_{4}], consists of Zn(H_{2}O)_{5}Cl octahedra with chloro bridges to tetrachlorozincate tetrahedra. Both the trihydrate and the heminonahydrate possess distinct (unbridged) hexaquozinc cations and tetrachlorozincate anions with the solid structure of the latter ([Zn(H_{2}O)_{6}][ZnCl_{4}]·3H_{2}O) incorporating three additional waters of crystallisation. Each of these hydrates can be produced by controlled evaporation of aqueous zinc chloride solutions under different temperature conditions.

== Preparation and purification ==
Historically, zinc chlorides are prepared from the reaction of hydrochloric acid with zinc metal or zinc oxide. Aqueous acids cannot be used to produce anhydrous zinc chloride. According to an early procedure, a suspension of powdered zinc in diethyl ether is treated with hydrogen chloride, followed by drying The overall method remains useful in industry, but without the solvent:

Zn + 2 HCl → ZnCl_{2} + H_{2}

Aqueous solutions may be readily prepared similarly by treating Zn metal, zinc carbonate, zinc oxide, and zinc sulfide with hydrochloric acid:

ZnS + 2 HCl + 4 H_{2}O → ZnCl_{2}(H_{2}O)_{4} + H_{2}S

Hydrates can be produced by evaporation of an aqueous solution of zinc chloride. The temperature of the evaporation determines the hydrates. For example, evaporation at room temperature produces the 1.33-hydrate. Lower evaporation temperatures produce higher hydrates.

Commercial samples of zinc chloride typically contain water and products from hydrolysis as impurities. Laboratory samples may be purified by recrystallization from hot dioxane. Anhydrous samples can be purified by sublimation in a stream of hydrogen chloride gas, followed by heating the sublimate to 400 °C in a stream of dry nitrogen gas. A simple method relies on treating the zinc chloride with thionyl chloride.

== Reactions ==
Zinc chloride is an occasional laboratory reagent, often as a Lewis acid.

=== Chloride complexes ===
A number of salts containing the tetrachlorozincate anion, [ZnCl_{4}]^{2−}, are known. "Caulton's reagent", V_{2}Cl_{3}(thf)_{6}][Zn_{2}Cl_{6}], named for Kenneth G. Caulton, is an example of a salt containing [Zn_{2}Cl_{6}]^{2−} that is used in organic chemistry. The compound Cs_{3}ZnCl_{5} contains tetrahedral [ZnCl_{4}]^{2−} and Cl^{−} anions, so, the compound is not caesium pentachlorozincate, but caesium tetrachlorozincate chloride. No compounds containing the [ZnCl_{6}]^{4−} ion (hexachlorozincate ion) have been characterized. The compound ZnCl_{2}·0.5HCl·H_{2}O crystallizes from a solution of ZnCl_{2} in hydrochloric acid. It contains a polymeric anion (Zn_{2}Cl^{−}_{5})_{n} with balancing monohydrated hydronium ions, H_{5}O^{+}_{2} ions.

=== Adducts ===
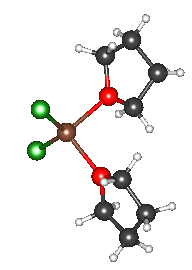
Crystal structure of ZnCl_{2}(thf)_{2}.

The adduct with thf ZnCl_{2}(thf)_{2} illustrates the tendency of zinc chloride to form 1:2 adducts with weak Lewis bases. Being soluble in ethers and lacking acidic protons, this complex is used in the synthesis of organozinc compounds. A related 1:2 complex is ZnCl_{2}(NH_{2}OH)_{2} (zinc dichloride di(hydroxylamine)). Known as Crismer's salt, this complexes releases hydroxylamine upon heating. The distinctive ability of aqueous solutions of ZnCl_{2} to dissolve cellulose is attributed to the formation of zinc-cellulose complexes, illustrating the stability of its adducts. Cellulose also dissolves in molten ZnCl_{2} hydrate. Overall, this behavior is consistent with Zn^{2+} as a hard Lewis acid.

When solutions of zinc chloride are treated with ammonia, diverse ammine complexes are produced. In addition to the tetrahedral 1:2 complex ZnCl_{2}(NH_{3})_{2}. the complex Zn(NH_{3})_{4}Cl_{2}·H_{2}O also has been isolated. The latter contains the [Zn(NH_{3})_{6}]^{2+} ion,. The species in aqueous solution have been investigated and show that [Zn(NH_{3})_{4}]^{2+} is the main species present with [Zn(NH_{3})_{3}Cl]^{+} also present at lower NH_{3}:Zn ratio.

=== Aqueous solutions of zinc chloride ===
Zinc chloride dissolves readily in water to give ZnCl_{x}(H_{2}O)_{4−x} species and some free chloride. Aqueous solutions of ZnCl_{2} are acidic: a 6 M aqueous solution has a pH of 1. The acidity of aqueous ZnCl_{2} solutions relative to solutions of other Zn^{2+} salts (say the sulfate) is due to the formation of the tetrahedral chloro aqua complexes such as [ZnCl_{3}(H_{2}O)]^{−}. Most metal dichlorides form octahedral complexes, with stronger O-H bonds. The combination of hydrochloric acid and ZnCl_{2} gives a reagent known as "Lucas reagent". Such reagents were once used as a test for primary alcohols. Similar reactions are the basis of industrial routes from methanol and ethanol respectively to methyl chloride and ethyl chloride.

In alkali solution, zinc chloride converts to various zinc hydroxychlorides. These include [Zn(OH)_{3}Cl]^{2−}, [Zn(OH)_{2}Cl_{2}]^{2−}, [Zn(OH)Cl_{3}]^{2−}, and the insoluble Zn_{5}(OH)_{8}Cl_{2}·H_{2}O. The latter is the mineral simonkolleite. When zinc chloride hydrates are heated, hydrogen chloride evolves and hydroxychlorides result.

In aqueous solution ZnCl_{2}, as well as other halides (bromide, iodide), behave interchangeably for the preparation of other zinc compounds. These salts give precipitates of zinc carbonate when treated with aqueous carbonate sources:

ZnCl_{2} + Na_{2}CO_{3} → ZnCO_{3} + 2 NaCl

Ninhydrin reacts with amino acids and amines to form a colored compound "Ruhemann's purple" (RP). Spraying with a zinc chloride solution, which is colorless, forms a 1:1 complex RP:ZnCl(H_{2}O)_{2}, which is more readily detected as it fluoresces more intensely than RP.

=== Redox ===
Anhydrous zinc chloride melts and even boils without any decomposition up to 900 °C. When zinc metal is dissolved in molten ZnCl_{2} at 500–700 °C, a yellow diamagnetic solution is formed consisting of the Zn^{2+}_{2}, which has zinc in the oxidation state +1. The nature of this dizinc dication has been confirmed by Raman spectroscopy. Although Zn^{2+}_{2} is unusual, mercury, a heavy congener of zinc, forms a wide variety of Hg^{2+}_{2} salts.

In the presence of oxygen, zinc chloride oxidizes to zinc oxide above 400 °C. Again, this observation indicates the nonoxidation of Zn^{2+}.

=== Zinc hydroxychloride ===
Concentrated aqueous zinc chloride dissolves zinc oxide to form zinc hydroxychloride, which is obtained as colorless crystals:

ZnCl_{2} + ZnO + H_{2}O → 2 ZnCl(OH)

The same material forms when hydrated zinc chloride is heated.

The ability of zinc chloride to dissolve metal oxides (MO) is relevant to the utility of ZnCl_{2} as a flux for soldering. It dissolves passivating oxides, exposing the clean metal surface.

=== Catalyst in organic syntheses ===
Zinc chloride is an adequate Lewis acid for electrophilic aromatic substitutions, as in the Fischer indole synthesis:

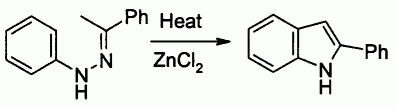

Related Lewis-acid behavior is illustrated by a traditional preparation of the dye fluorescein from phthalic anhydride and resorcinol. The key reaction is a Friedel-Crafts acylation:

This transformation has in fact been accomplished using even the hydrated ZnCl_{2} sample shown in the picture above. Many examples describe the use of zinc chloride in Friedel-Crafts acylation reactions.

Zinc chloride also activates benzylic and allylic halides towards substitution by weak nucleophiles such as alkenes:

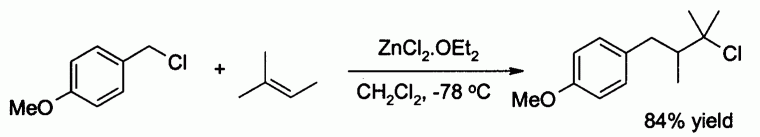

In similar fashion, ZnCl_{2} promotes selective Na[BH_{3}(CN)] reduction of tertiary, allylic or benzylic halides to the corresponding hydrocarbons.

A dramatic example of zinc chloride promoting carbon-carbon bond formation was first reported in 1880 by Joseph Achille Le Bel and William H. Greene. They reported the formation of a mixture aromatic and non-aromatic hydrocarbons when methanol is added to molten zinc chloride. An idealised equation for the formation of hexamethylbenzene by this process is

15 CH_{3}OH → C_{6}(CH_{3})_{6} + 3 CH_{4} + 15 H_{2}O

This kind of reactivity has been investigated for the valorization of C1 precursors.

Zinc enolates, prepared from alkali metal enolates and ZnCl_{2}, provide control of stereochemistry in aldol condensation reactions. This control is attributed to chelation at the zinc centre. In the example shown below, the threo product was favored over the erythro by a factor of 5:1 in the presence of ZnCl_{2}.

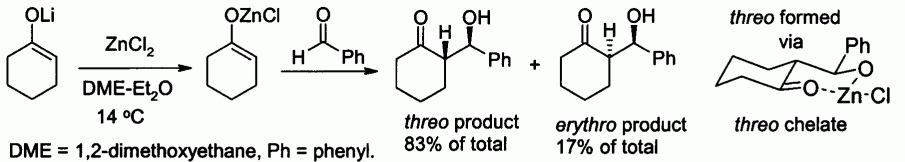

=== Organozinc precursor ===
Being inexpensive and anhydrous, ZnCl_{2} is a widely used for the synthesis of many organozinc reagents, such as those used in the palladium catalyzed Negishi coupling with aryl halides or vinyl halides. The prominence of this reaction was highlighted by the award of the 2010 Nobel Prize in Chemistry to Ei-ichi Negishi.

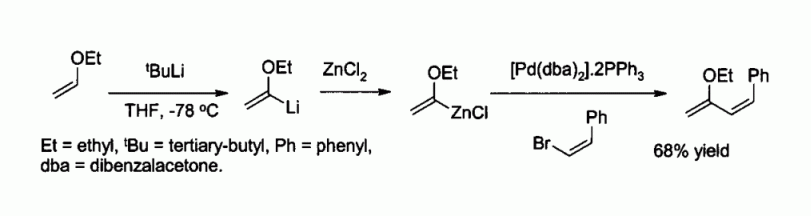

Rieke zinc, a highly reactive form of zinc metal, is generated by reduction of zinc dichloride with lithium. Rieke Zn is useful for the preparation of polythiophenes and for the Reformatsky reaction.

== Industrial applications ==
=== Industrial organic chemistry ===
Zinc chloride is used as a catalyst or reagent in diverse reactions conducted on an industrial scale. Benzaldehyde, 20,000 tons of which is produced annually in Western countries, is produced from inexpensive toluene by exploiting the catalytic properties of zinc dichloride. This process begins with the chlorination of toluene to give benzal chloride. In the presence of a small amount of anhydrous zinc chloride, a mixture of benzal chloride are treated continuously with water according to the following stoichiometry:

C_{6}H_{5}CHCl_{2} + H_{2}O → C_{6}H_{5}CHO + 2 HCl

Similarly zinc chloride is employed in hydrolysis of benzotrichloride, the main route to benzoyl chloride. It serves as a catalyst for the production of methylene-bis(dithiocarbamate).

=== As a metallurgical flux ===
The use of zinc chloride as a flux, sometimes in a mixture with ammonium chloride (see also Zinc ammonium chloride), involves the production of HCl and its subsequent reaction with surface oxides.

Zinc chloride forms two salts with ammonium chloride: [NH_{4}]_{2}[ZnCl_{4}] and [NH_{4}]_{3}[ZnCl_{4}]Cl, which decompose on heating liberating HCl, just as zinc chloride hydrate does. The action of zinc chloride/ammonium chloride fluxes, for example, in the hot-dip galvanizing process produces H_{2} gas and ammonia fumes.

=== Other uses ===
Relevant to its affinity for these paper and textiles, ZnCl_{2} is used as a fireproofing agent and in the process of making Vulcanized fibre, which is made by soaking paper in concentrated zinc chloride. Zinc chloride is also used as a deodorizing agent and to make zinc soaps.

== Safety and health ==
Zinc and chloride are essential for life. Zn^{2+} is a component of several enzymes, e.g., carboxypeptidase and carbonic anhydrase. Thus, aqueous solutions of zinc chlorides are rarely problematic as an acute poison. Anhydrous zinc chloride is however an aggressive Lewis acid as it can burn skin and other tissues. Ingestion of zinc chloride, often from soldering flux, requires endoscopic monitoring. Another source of zinc chloride is zinc chloride smoke mixture ("HC") used in smoke grenades. Containing zinc oxide, hexachloroethane and aluminium powder release zinc chloride, carbon and aluminium oxide smoke, an effective smoke screen. Such smoke screens can lead to fatalities.
