= Zinc fluoride =

Chemical compound

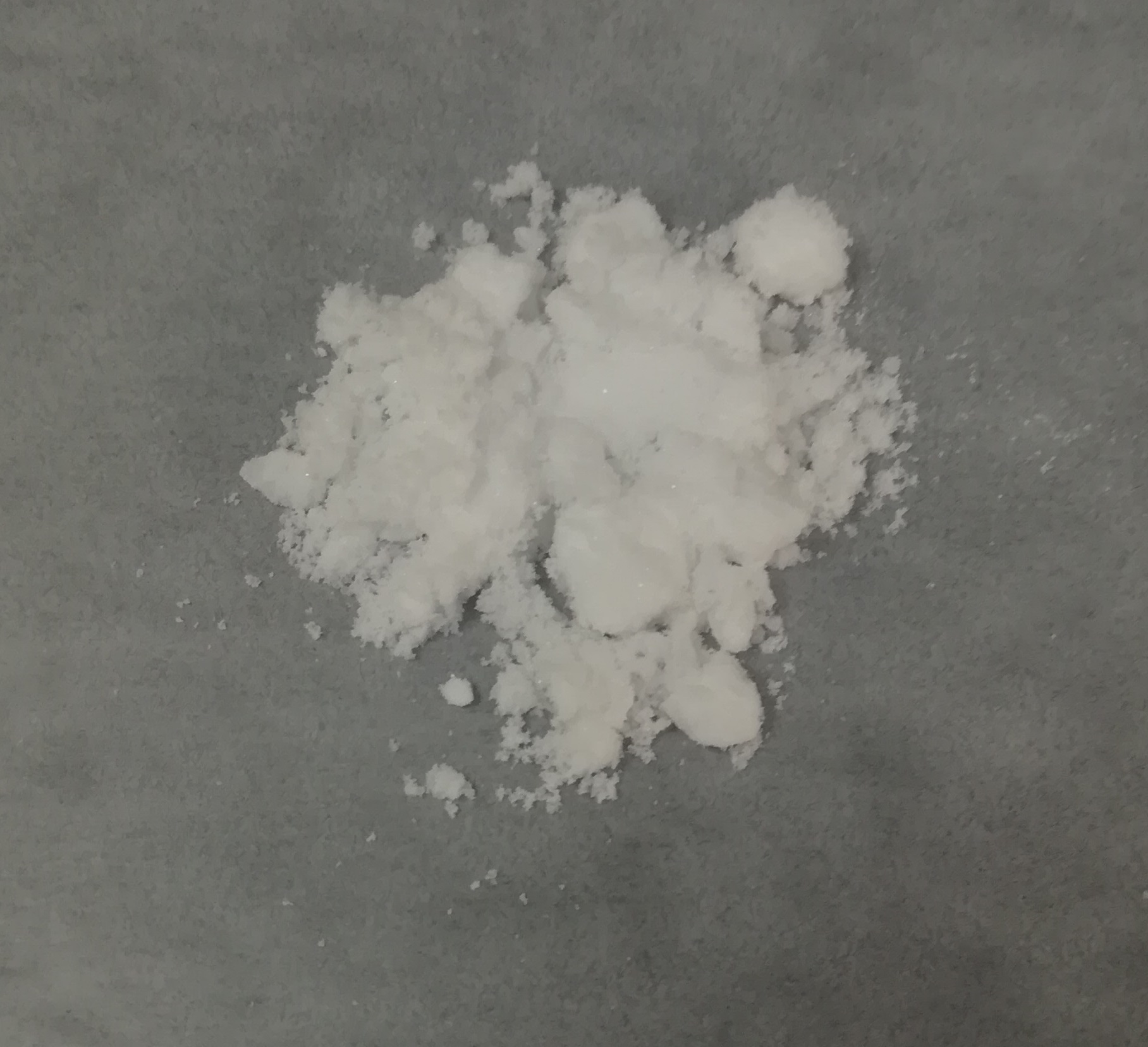
- Zinc fluoride

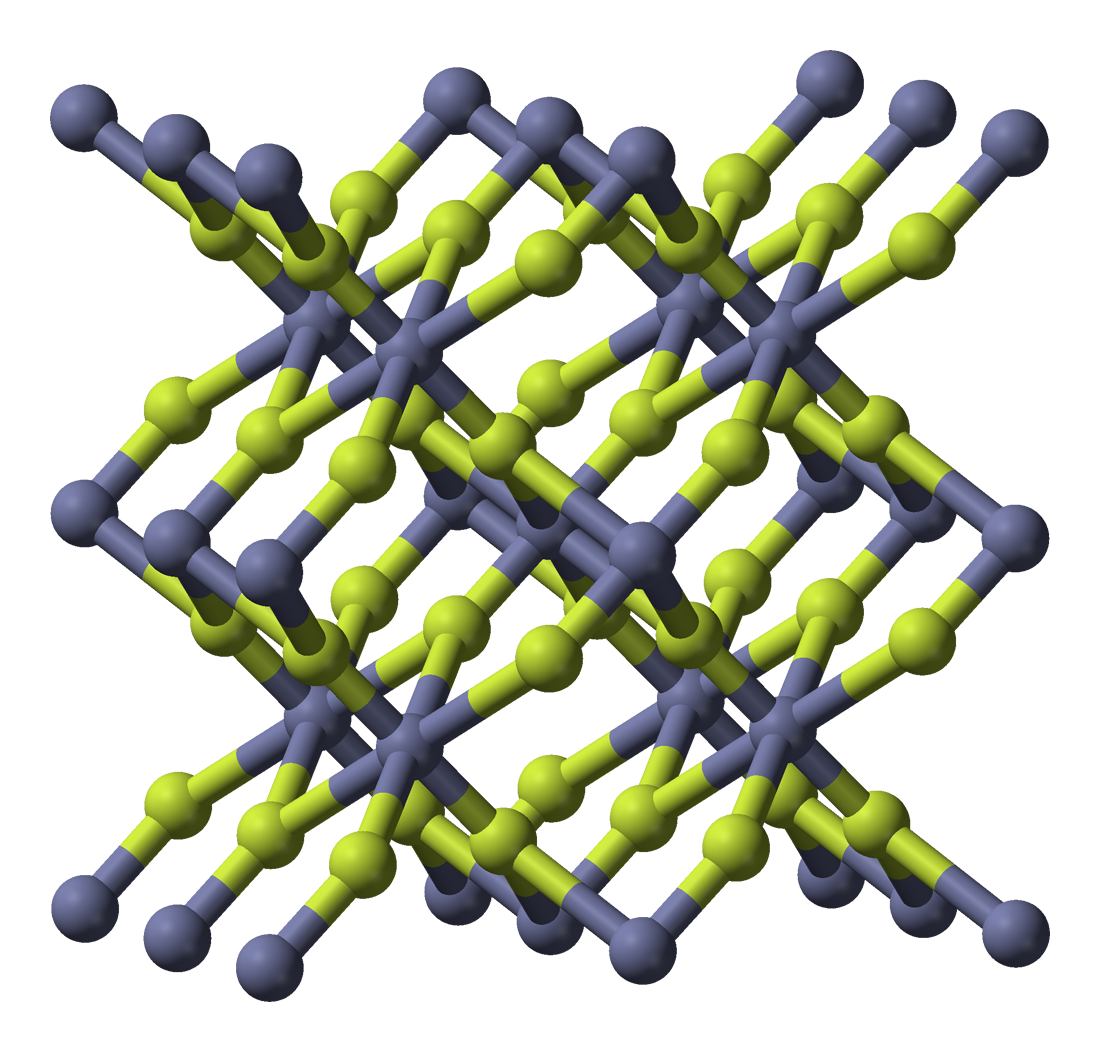

Names
- IUPAC name Zinc(II) fluoride
- Other names Zinc difluoride

Identifiers
CAS Number	7783-49-5; 13986-18-0 (tetrahydrate)
3D model (JSmol)	Interactive image
ChemSpider	22957
ECHA InfoCard	100.029.092
EC Number	232-001-9
PubChem CID	24551
RTECS number	ZH3200000
UNII	L9V334775I; SQ7815WXFB (tetrahydrate)
UN number	3077
CompTox Dashboard (EPA)	DTXSID20894882
- InChI: InChI=1S/2FH.Zn/h2*1H;/q;;+2/p-2 Key: BHHYHSUAOQUXJK-UHFFFAOYSA-L
- SMILES: F[Zn]F

Properties
Chemical formula	ZnF_{2}
Molar mass	103.406 g/mol (anhydrous); 175.45 g/mol (tetrahydrate)
Appearance	white needles hygroscopic
Density	4.95 g/cm^{3} (anhydrous); 2.30 g/cm^{3} (tetrahydrate)
Melting point	872 °C (1,602 °F; 1,145 K) (anhydrous); 100 °C, decomposes (tetrahydrate)
Boiling point	1,500 °C (2,730 °F; 1,770 K) (anhydrous)
Solubility in water	.000052 g/(100 mL) (anhydrous); 1.52 g/(100 mL), 20 °C (tetrahydrate)
Solubility	sparingly soluble in HCl, HNO_{3}, ammonia
Magnetic susceptibility (χ)	−38.2·10^{−6} cm^{3}/mol

Structure
Crystal structure	tetragonal (anhydrous), tP6
Space group	P4_{2}/mnm, No. 136

Hazards
- GHS labelling
Pictograms	(GHS05: Corrosive) (GHS06: Toxic) (GHS07: Exclamation mark)
Signal word	Danger
Hazard statements	H301, H315, H318, H335
Precautionary statements	P261, P264, P270, P271, P280, P301+P310, P302+P352, P304+P340, P305+P351+P338, P310, P312, P330, P332+P313, P337+P313, P362, P403+P233, P405, P501
NFPA 704 (fire diamond)	3 0 0

Related compounds
Other anions	Zinc(II) bromide; Zinc(II) chloride; Zinc(II) iodide
Other cations	Cadmium(II) fluoride; Mercury(II) fluoride
- Except where otherwise noted, data are given for materials in their standard state (at 25 °C [77 °F], 100 kPa). verify (what is ?) Infobox references

Zinc fluoride is an inorganic chemical compound with the chemical formula ZnF_{2}. It is encountered as the anhydrous form and also as the tetrahydrate, ZnF_{2}·4H_{2}O (rhombohedral crystal structure). It has a high melting point and has the rutile structure containing 6 coordinate zinc, which suggests appreciable ionic character in its chemical bonding. Unlike the other zinc halides, ZnCl_{2}, ZnBr_{2} and ZnI_{2}, it is not very soluble in water.

Like some other metal difluorides, ZnF_{2} crystallizes in the rutile structure, which features octahedral Zn cations and trigonal planar fluorides.

== Preparation and reactions ==
Zinc fluoride can be synthesized several ways.

- The reaction of zinc metal with fluorine gas.
- Reaction of hydrofluoric acid with zinc, to yield hydrogen gas (H_{2}) and zinc fluoride (ZnF_{2}).

Zinc fluoride can be hydrolysed by hot water to form the zinc hydroxide fluoride, Zn(OH)F.

The salt is believed to form both a tetrahydrate and a dihydrate.
