= Cadmium iodide =

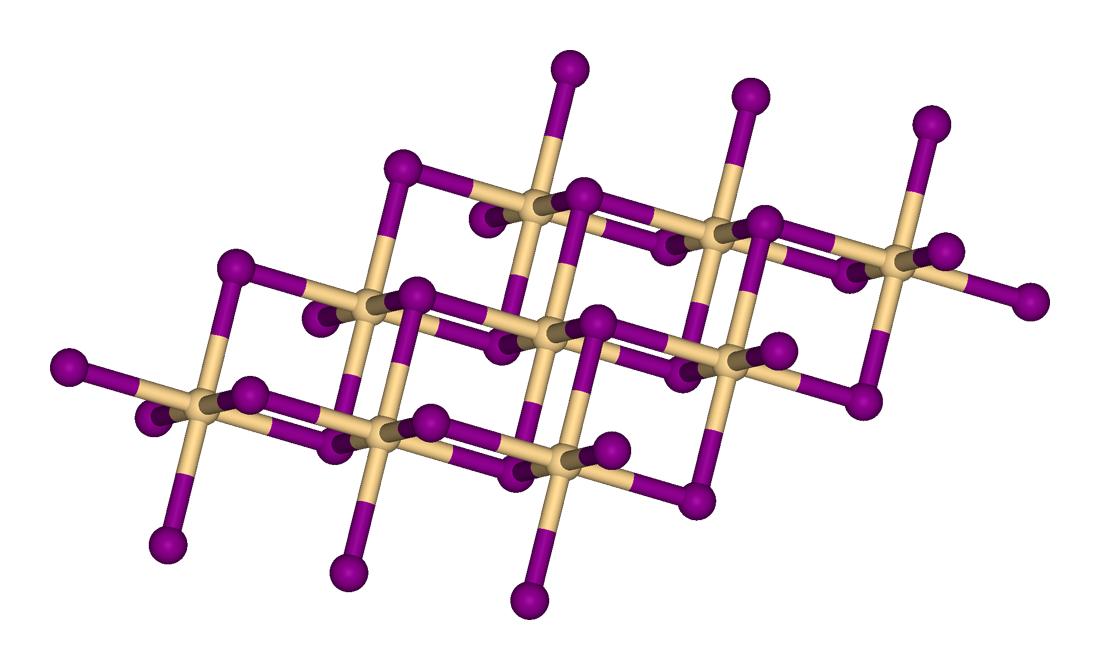
- Cadmium iodide

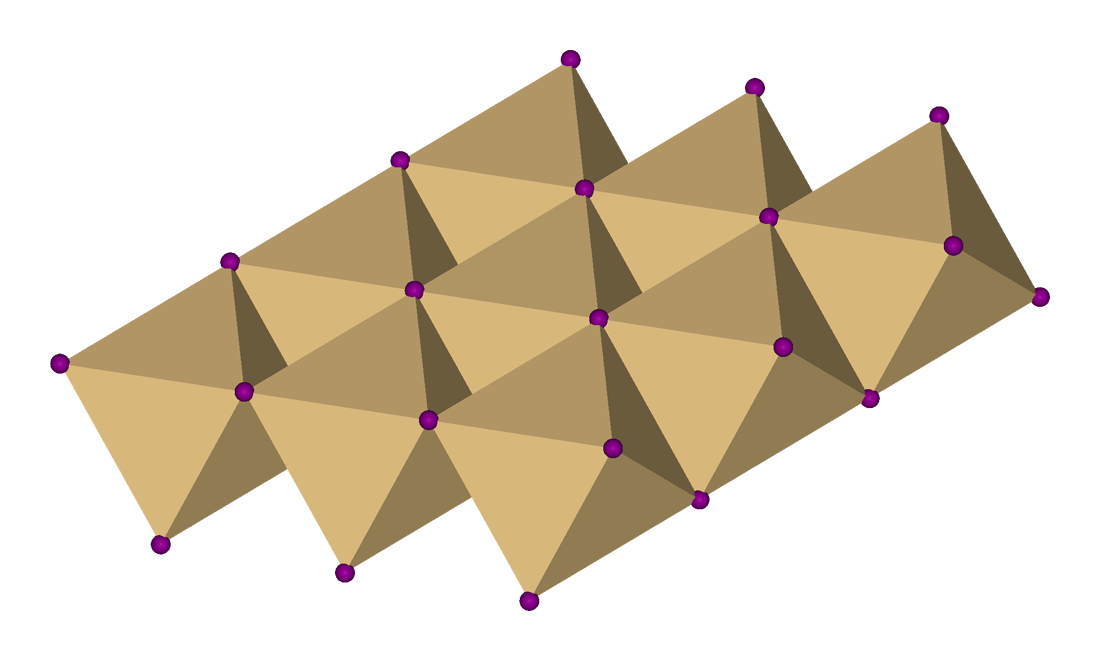
- Cadmium iodide

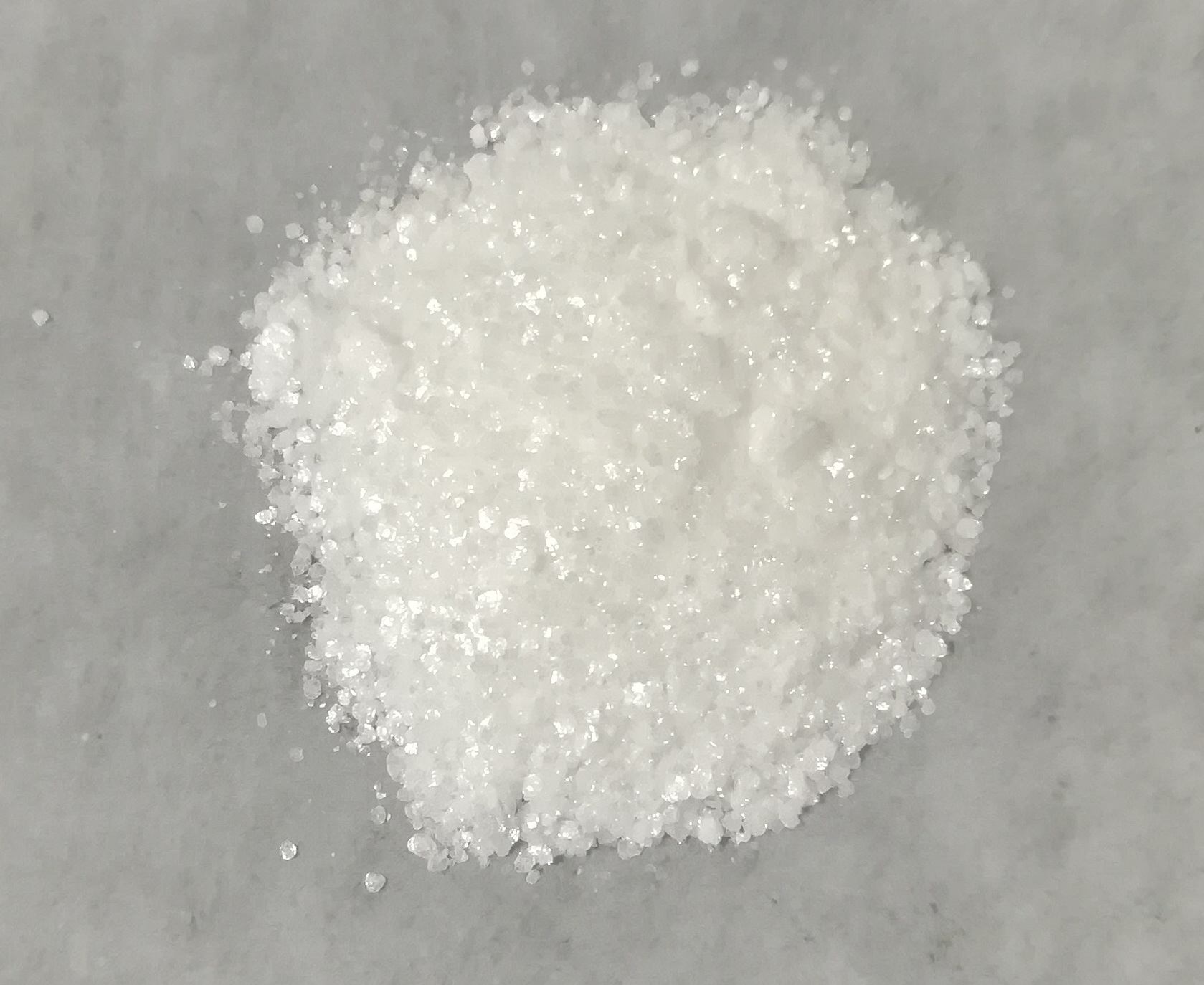

Names
- IUPAC name Cadmium(II) iodide
- Other names Cadmium diiodide

Identifiers
CAS Number	7790-80-9
3D model (JSmol)	Interactive image
ChemSpider	23037
ECHA InfoCard	100.029.294
EC Number	232-223-6
PubChem CID	277692
UNII	2F2UPU4KCW
CompTox Dashboard (EPA)	DTXSID20894887
- InChI: InChI=1S/Cd.2HI/h;2*1H/q+2;;/p-2 Key: OKIIEJOIXGHUKX-UHFFFAOYSA-L; InChI=1/Cd.2HI/h;2*1H/q+2;;/p-2 Key: OKIIEJOIXGHUKX-NUQVWONBAZ
- SMILES: [I][Cd][I]

Properties
Chemical formula	CdI_{2}
Molar mass	366.22 g/mol
Appearance	white to pale yellow crystals
Density	5.640 g/cm^{3}, solid
Melting point	387 °C (729 °F; 660 K)
Boiling point	742 °C (1,368 °F; 1,015 K)
Solubility in water	787 g/L (0 °C); 847 g/L (20 °C); 1250 g/L (100 °C)
Solubility	soluble in ethanol, acetone, ether and ammonia
Magnetic susceptibility (χ)	−117.2·10^{−6} cm^{3}/mol

Structure
Crystal structure	Trigonal, hP3, space group P3̅m1, No. 164
Coordination geometry	octahedral

Hazards
- GHS labelling
Pictograms	(GHS06: Toxic) (GHS08: Health hazard) (GHS09: Environmental hazard)
Signal word	Danger
Hazard statements	H301, H331, H351, H373, H410
Precautionary statements	P260, P280, P301+P330+P331, P304+P340, P310, P311, P403+P233
NFPA 704 (fire diamond)	3 0 0
- NIOSH (US health exposure limits)
PEL (Permissible)	[1910.1027] TWA 0.005 mg/m^{3} (as Cd)
REL (Recommended)	Ca
IDLH (Immediate danger)	Ca [9 mg/m^{3} (as Cd)]

Related compounds
Other anions	cadmium fluoride cadmium chloride cadmium bromide
Other cations	zinc iodide mercury(II) iodide
- Except where otherwise noted, data are given for materials in their standard state (at 25 °C [77 °F], 100 kPa). verify (what is ?) Infobox references

Cadmium iodide is an inorganic compound with the formula CdI_{2}. It is a white hygroscopic solid. It also can be obtained as a mono- and tetrahydrate. It has few applications. It is notable for its crystal structure, which is typical for compounds of the form MX_{2} with strong polarization effects.

== Preparation ==
Cadmium iodide is prepared by the addition of cadmium metal, or its oxide, hydroxide or carbonate to hydroiodic acid. Also, the compound can be made by heating cadmium with iodine.

== Applications ==
Historically, cadmium iodide was used as a catalyst for the Henkel process, a high-temperature isomerisation of dipotassium phthalate to yield the terephthalate. The salt was then treated with acetic acid to yield potassium acetate and commercially valuable terephthalic acid.

While uneconomical compared to the production of terephthalic acid from p-xylene, the Henkel method has been proposed as a potential route to produce terephthalic acid from furfural. As existing Bio-PET is still reliant on petroleum as a source of p-xylene, the Henkel process could theoretically offer a completely bioplastic route to polyethylene terephthalate.

== Crystal structure ==
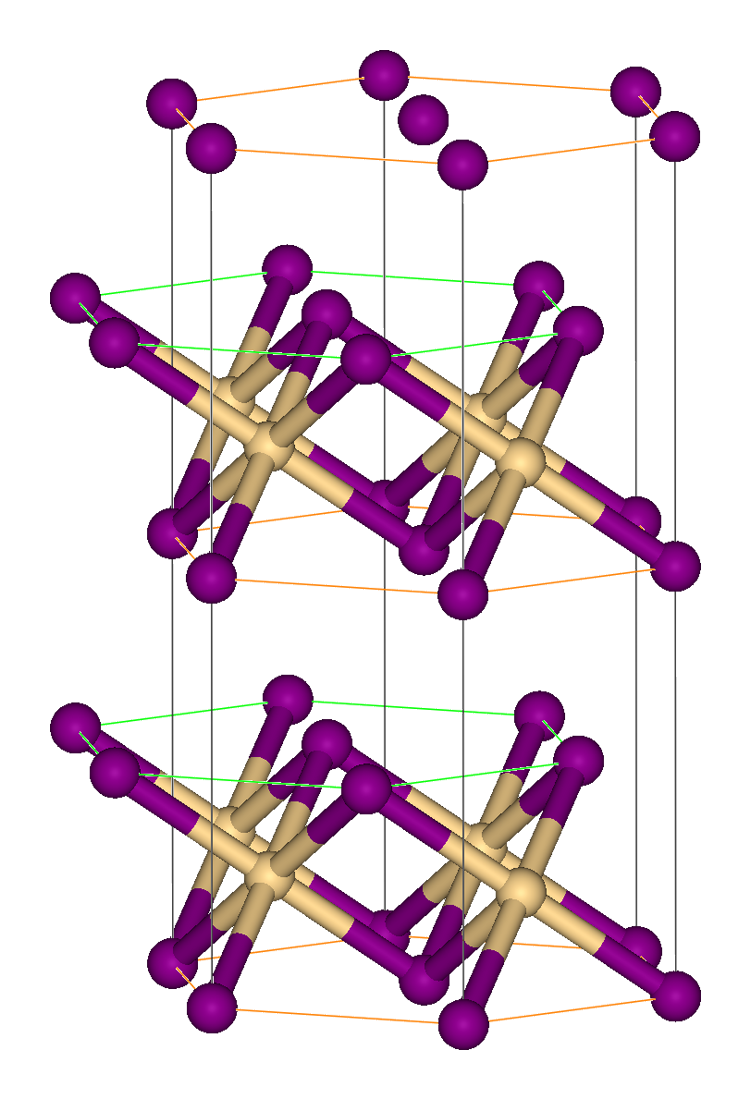
The iodide anions in CdI_{2} form a hexagonal close-packed lattice, while the cadmium cations occupy all of the octahedral holes in alternating layers.

In cadmium iodide the iodide anions form a hexagonal closely packed arrangement while the cadmium cations fill all of the octahedral sites in alternate layers. The resultant structure consists of a layered lattice. This same basic structure is found in many other salts and minerals. Cadmium iodide is mostly ionically bonded but with partial covalent character.

Cadmium iodide's crystal structure is the prototype on which the crystal structures of many other compounds can be considered to be based. Compounds with any of the following characteristics tend to adopt the CdI_{2} structure:

- Iodides of moderately polarising cations; bromides and chlorides of strongly polarising cations
- Hydroxides of dications, i.e. compounds with the general formula M(OH)_{2}
- Sulfides, selenides and tellurides (chalcogenides) of tetracations, i.e. compounds with the general formula MX_{2}, where X = S, Se, Te
