= Zinc chloride hydroxide monohydrate =

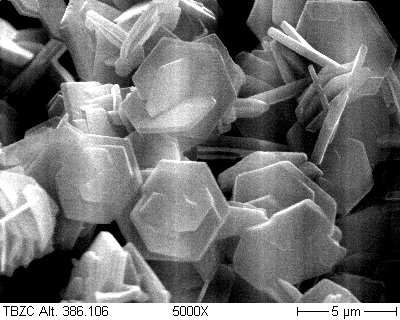

Names
- IUPAC name Pentazinc dichloride octahydroxide monohydrate
- Other names: Basic zinc chloride; Chemlock's Nurilock TB[Z]C; Micronutrients TBZC; Tetrabasic zinc chloride hydrate; Zinc chloride hydroxide monohydrate; Zinc hydroxychloride; Zinc oxychloride

Identifiers
CAS Number	12167-79-2
3D model (JSmol)	Interactive image
- InChI: InChI=1S/2ClH.9H2O.5Zn/h2*1H;9*1H2;;;;;/q;;;;;;;;;;;5*+2/p-10 Key: LOUBNQJSBFZNMG-UHFFFAOYSA-D
- SMILES: [Cl-].[Cl-].O.[OH-].[OH-].[OH-].[OH-].[OH-].[OH-].[OH-].[OH-].[Zn+2].[Zn+2].[Zn+2].[Zn+2].[Zn+2]

Properties
Chemical formula	Zn_{5}(OH)_{8}Cl_{2}·H_{2}O
Molar mass	551.87 g·mol^{−1}
Appearance	White or colorless crystalline solid
Density	3.3 g/cm^{3}
Solubility in water	Insoluble in water, pH 6.9 measured by EPA method SW846-9045
Solubility	Insoluble in organic solvents

Structure
Crystal structure	Hexagonal
Coordination geometry	Octahedral and tetrahedral

Hazards
NFPA 704 (fire diamond)	1 0 0
Flash point	Non-flammable
- Safety data sheet (SDS)
- Except where otherwise noted, data are given for materials in their standard state (at 25 °C [77 °F], 100 kPa). verify (what is ?) Infobox references

Zinc chloride hydroxide monohydrate or more accurately pentazinc dichloride octahydroxide monohydrate is a zinc hydroxy compound with chemical formula Zn_{5}(OH)_{8}Cl_{2}·H_{2}O. It is often referred to as tetrabasic zinc chloride (TBZC), basic zinc chloride, zinc hydroxychloride, or zinc oxychloride. It is a colorless crystalline solid insoluble in water. Its naturally occurring form, simonkolleite, has been shown to be a desirable nutritional supplement for animals.

== Natural occurrence ==
The naturally occurring mineral form, simonkolleite, was described as a new mineral in 1985 for samples collected at Richelsdorf, Germany. It is a rare secondary mineral formed by weathering of zinc-bearing slag, and is associated with native zinc, hydrocerussite, diaboleite, zincite and hydrozincite. It is named after Werner Simon and Kurt Kolle, mineral collectors of Cornberg, near Michelsdorf who submitted the samples for investigation. Simonkolleite is frequently found as a corrosion product of Zinc bearing metals.

== Structure ==
Simonkolleite is rhombohedral, space group R3̅m. There are two crystallographically distinct zinc sites in Simonkolleite, both of which are fully occupied by zinc. The Zn(1) site is coordinated by six hydroxyl (OH) groups in an octahedral geometry [Zn(OH)_{6}]. The Zn(2) site is coordinated by three OH groups, and one Cl atom in a tetrahedral geometry [Zn(OH)_{3}Cl]. The [Zn(OH)_{6}] octahedra form an edge-sharing dioctahedral sheet similar to that observed in dioctahedral micas. On each site of the vacant octahedron, a [Zn(OH)_{3}Cl] tetrahedron is attached to three anions of the sheet and points away from the sheet. Intercalated between adjacent sheets are interstitial water (H_{2}O) groups. The sheets are held together by hydrogen bonding from OH groups of one sheet to Cl anions of adjacent sheets, and to interstitial H_{2}O groups. The [Zn(OH)_{6}] octahedra have four long equatorial bonds (at 2.157 Å) and two short apical bonds (at 2.066 Å). This apical shortening is a result of the bond-valence requirements of the coordinating OH groups and the connectivity of polyhedra in the structure. The equatorial OH groups [O(1)H] are coordinated by two Zn(1) cations and one Zn(2) cation, whereas the apical OH groups [O(2)H] are coordinated by three Zn(1) cations. As Zn(1) is six-coordinated and Zn(2) is four-coordinated, the local bond-valence requirements require the Zn(1)-O(1) bonds to be considerably longer than the Zn(1)-O(2) bonds. The [Zn(OH)_{3}Cl] tetrahedron has three short Zn(2)-O(1) bonds (at 1.950 Å) and one long Zn(2)-Cl bond (2.312 Å) (Figure 1).

Figure 1. Zn coordination and bonding in Simonkolleite

== Properties ==
Simonkolleite is colorless, forms tabular hexagonal crystal up to 1 mm in diameter, and has perfect cleavage parallel to (001).

Thermal stability studies have shown that simonkolleite decomposes to ZnO at several stages upon heating (eq. 1-3). The decomposition starts with loss of a single mole of the lattice water. Further dehydration at 165−210 °C produces a mixture of ZnO and an intermediate Zn(OH)Cl. At 210−300 °C, the intermediate Zn(OH)Cl decomposes to ZnO and ZnCl_{2}. At higher temperature, volatilization of zinc chloride occurs, leaving a final residue of zinc oxide.

Zn_{5}(OH)_{8}Cl_{2}·H_{2}O Zn_{5}(OH)_{8}Cl_{2} + H_{2}O	eq. 1

Zn_{5}(OH)_{8}Cl_{2} 2 Zn(OH)Cl + ZnO + H_{2}O	eq. 2

2 Zn(OH)Cl ZnCl_{2} + ZnO + H_{2}O	eq. 3

The dehydrated mixture (Zn(OH)Cl and ZnO) is easily rehydrated and converted back to simonkolleite upon exposure to cool moist air (eq. 4).

2 Zn(OH)Cl + 3 ZnO + 4 H_{2}O Zn_{5}(OH)_{8}Cl_{2}·H_{2}O	eq. 4

Simonkolleite is virtually insoluble in water and organic solvents, soluble in mineral acids yielding the corresponding zinc salts (eq. 5), soluble in ammonia, amine and EDTA solutions under complex formation. It can easily be converted to zinc hydroxide by reacting with sodium hydroxide (eq. 6). Its pH in water is 6.9 measured by EPA method SW846-9045.

Zn_{5}(OH)_{8}Cl_{2}·H_{2}O + 8 HCl → 5 ZnCl_{2} + 9 H_{2}O	eq. 5

Zn_{5}(OH)_{8}Cl_{2}·H_{2}O + 2 NaOH → 5 Zn(OH)_{2} + 2 NaCl + H_{2}O	eq. 6

== Preparation ==
=== From hydrolysis of ZnCl_{2} ===
Basic zinc chloride can be prepared by hydrolysis of a ZnCl_{2} solution in the presence of a base such as sodium hydroxide or ammonia (eq. 7-8).

5 ZnCl_{2} + 8 NaOH + H_{2}O → Zn_{5}(OH)_{8}Cl_{2}·H_{2}O + 8 NaCl	eq. 7

5 ZnCl_{2} + 8 NH_{3} + 9 H_{2}O → Zn_{5}(OH)_{8}Cl_{2}·H_{2}O + 8 [NH_{4}]Cl	eq. 8

Simonkolleite nanodisks with a width of 40 nm have been successfully synthesized via a hydrothermal method using zinc chloride and ammonia as the starting materials.

=== From reaction of ZnCl_{2} with ZnO ===
Basic zinc chloride can be synthesized from the reaction of a ZnCl_{2} solution with ZnO (eq. 9).

ZnCl_{2} + 4 ZnO + 5 H_{2}O → Zn_{5}(OH)_{8}Cl_{2}·H_{2}O	eq. 9

It can be synthesized from nano-sized ZnO particles aged in aqueous ZnCl_{2} solution at 6–140 °C for 48 h. Elevating the aging temperature increases the crystallinity of basic zinc chloride.

== Applications ==
=== As a feed additive and nutrition supplement for animals ===
Zinc is an essential trace element for all animals. It is found in all organs and tissues of the body, with bone, muscle, liver, kidney, and skin accounting for the majority of body zinc. Zinc is commonly added to diets for animals in a supplemental form, usually as inorganic feed-grade zinc oxide or zinc sulfate hydrate, or one of the organic zinc chelates and complexes. In several experiments, zinc oxide has been shown to be less bioavailable for poultry and pigs than reagent-grade or feed-grade zinc sulfate; however, the sulfate forms are highly water-soluble and thus also hygroscopic under humid conditions.

Tetrabasic zinc chloride (Simonkolleite), a zinc hydroxy mineral, is a new form of zinc nutrition supplement for animals. When TBZC is made by a crystallization process (Micronutrients TBZC), it excludes contaminating ions, providing a product with greater purity and fewer dust particles than occurs with precipitation. The result is a crystalline solid that is essentially insoluble in water, non-hygroscopic, un-reactive in most foods or feedstuffs, and yet highly bioavailable.

Since TBZC is neutral and water-insoluble, it has excellent palatability and very low interactions with other ingredients in a food mixture compared to zinc chloride, zinc sulfate or chelated forms of the metal. It also avoids the problems with caking.

It has been shown that the relative zinc bioavailability for chicks in TBZC is two to three times higher than that in Waselz-processed ZnO.

Research studies performed at universities and feed industry have all indicated that TBZC has a higher bioavailability relative to zinc sulfate, with values ranging from 102 to 111%. Four studies comparing TBZC to zinc oxide as a growth promoter all indicate improved weight gain and feed conversion at lower levels using TBZC. Testing in vitro has shown better antimicrobial activity with TBZC than both zinc sulfate and zinc oxide. Investigation on growth performance and some physiological parameters in the digestive tract of weanling piglets has shown that TBZC stimulated the synthesis and secretion of pancreatic chymotrypsin and may promote intestinal health.

=== As a stabilizing agent in nutritional and fungicidal compositions ===
Basic zinc chloride has been used as a stabilizing agent in nutritional and fungicidal compositions for application to the foliage of growing plants.

=== As a Zn supplementation to metalloprotease therapy ===
Tetrabasic zinc chloride has been used as a Zn supplementation for increasing responsiveness to therapeutic metalloproteases, including increasing and/or maximizing responsiveness and preventing botulinum and tetanus toxin resistance due to a functional deficiency of zinc.

=== In oral compositions ===
Basic zinc chloride has been used as a therapeutically active agent in oral compositions for the care of teeth.

=== In coating compositions ===
Basic zinc chloride, in combination with water-soluble alkali metal silicate, is used to coat substrates normally infested by algae, such as concrete roofing tiles and other silicate-containing building materials, to prevent or minimize algal infestation that imparts a dark, unsightly appearance.

A zinc-based plating layer formed by basic zinc chloride and magnesium has been shown to display excellent corrosion resistance.

=== In color development materials ===
Basic zinc chloride is one of the three components to prepare color development materials used for pressure-sensitive copying papers and thermo-sensitive recording papers.
