= Mercury(II) bromide =

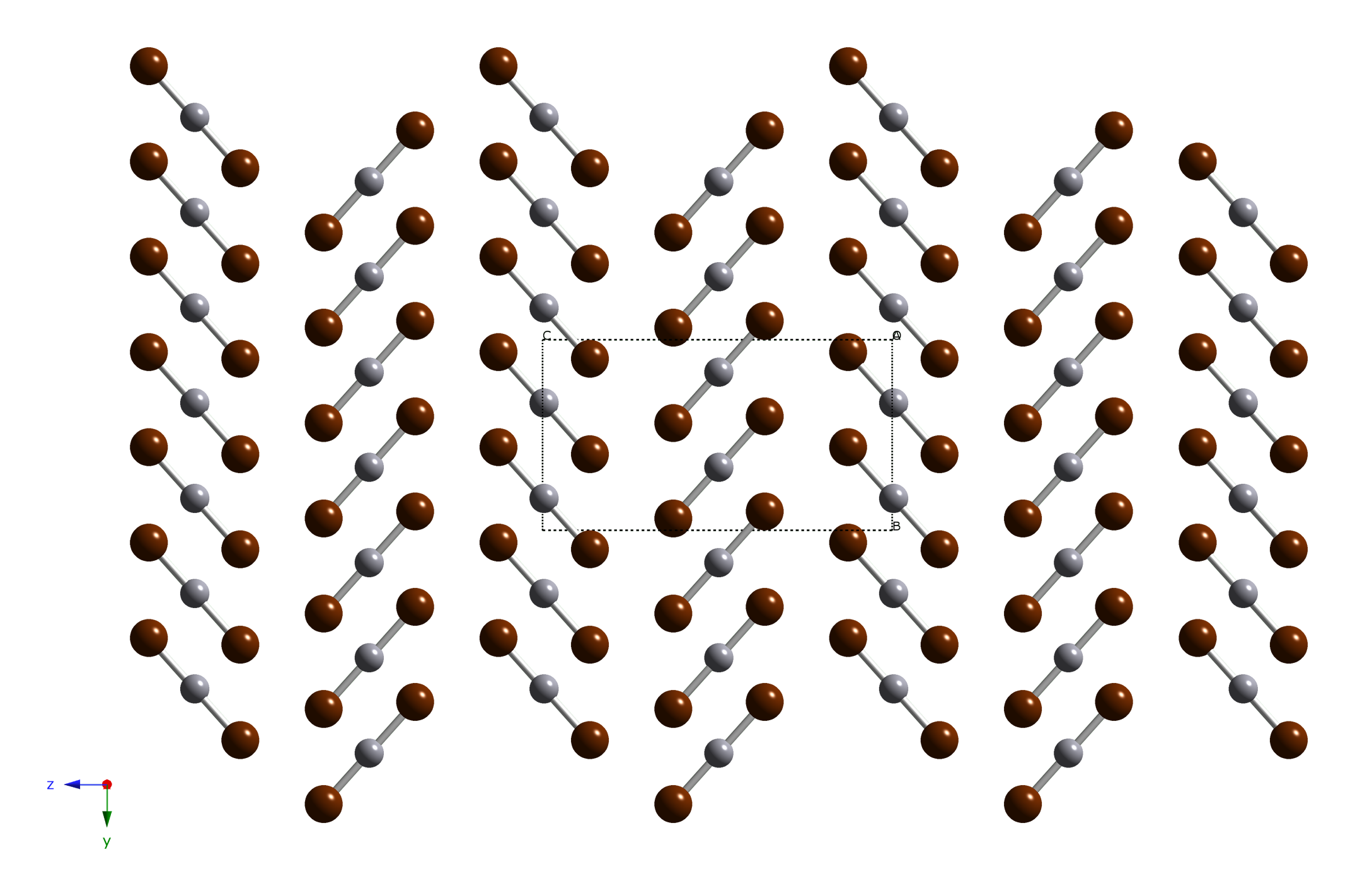
- Mercury(II) bromide

Names
- IUPAC name Mercury(II) bromide
- Other names Mercuric bromide

Identifiers
| CAS Number | 7789-47-1 |
| 3D model (JSmol) | Interactive image |
| ChEBI | CHEBI:49639 |
| ChemSpider | 23014 |
| ECHA InfoCard | 100.029.245 |
| EC Number | 232-169-3 |
| PubChem CID | 24612 |
| RTECS number | OV7415000 |
| UNII | P986675T8V |
| UN number | 1634 |
| CompTox Dashboard (EPA) | DTXSID2064864 |
- InChI: InChI=1S/2BrH.Hg/h2*1H;/q;;+2/p-2 Key: NGYIMTKLQULBOO-UHFFFAOYSA-L
- SMILES: Br[Hg]Br

Properties
| Chemical formula | HgBr_{2} |
| Molar mass | 360.41 g/mol |
| Appearance | white solid |
| Density | 6.03 g/cm^{3}, solid |
| Melting point | 237 °C (459 °F; 510 K) |
| Boiling point | 322 °C (612 °F; 595 K) |
| Solubility in water | 0.6 g/100 mL (25°C) |
| Solubility | 30 g/100 mL (25°C) ethanol |
| Magnetic susceptibility (χ) | −94.2·10^{−6} cm^{3}/mol |

Structure
| Coordination geometry | rhombic |

Hazards
- GHS labelling
| Pictograms | (GHS06: Toxic) (GHS08: Health hazard) (GHS09: Environmental hazard) |
| Signal word | Danger |
| Hazard statements | H300, H310, H330, H373, H410 |
| Precautionary statements | P260, P262, P264, P270, P271, P273, P280, P284, P301+P310, P302+P350, P304+P340, P310, P314, P320, P321, P330, P361, P363, P391, P403+P233, P405, P501 |
| NFPA 704 (fire diamond) | 3 0 2 |
| Flash point | Non-flammable |

Related compounds
| Other anions | Mercury(II) fluoride Mercury(II) chloride Mercury(II) iodide |
| Other cations | Zinc bromide Cadmium bromide Mercury(I) bromide |
- Except where otherwise noted, data are given for materials in their standard state (at 25 °C [77 °F], 100 kPa). verify (what is ?) Infobox references

Mercury(II) bromide or mercuric bromide is an inorganic compound with the formula HgBr_{2}. This white solid is a laboratory reagent. Like all mercury salts, it is highly toxic.

== Preparation ==
Mercury(II) bromide can be produced by reaction of metallic mercury with bromine.

== Reactions ==
Mercury(II) bromide is used as a reagent in the Koenigs–Knorr reaction, which forms glycoside linkages on carbohydrates.

It is also used to test for the presence of arsenic, as recommended by the European Pharmacopoeia. The arsenic in the sample is first converted to arsine gas by treatment with hydrogen. Arsine reacts with mercury(II) bromide:

AsH_{3} + 3HgBr_{2} → As(HgBr)_{3} + 3HBr

The white mercury(II) bromide will turn yellow, brown, or black if arsenic is present in the sample.

Mercury(II) bromide reacts violently with elemental indium at high temperatures and, when exposed to potassium, can form shock-sensitive explosive mixtures.
