= Zinc bromide =

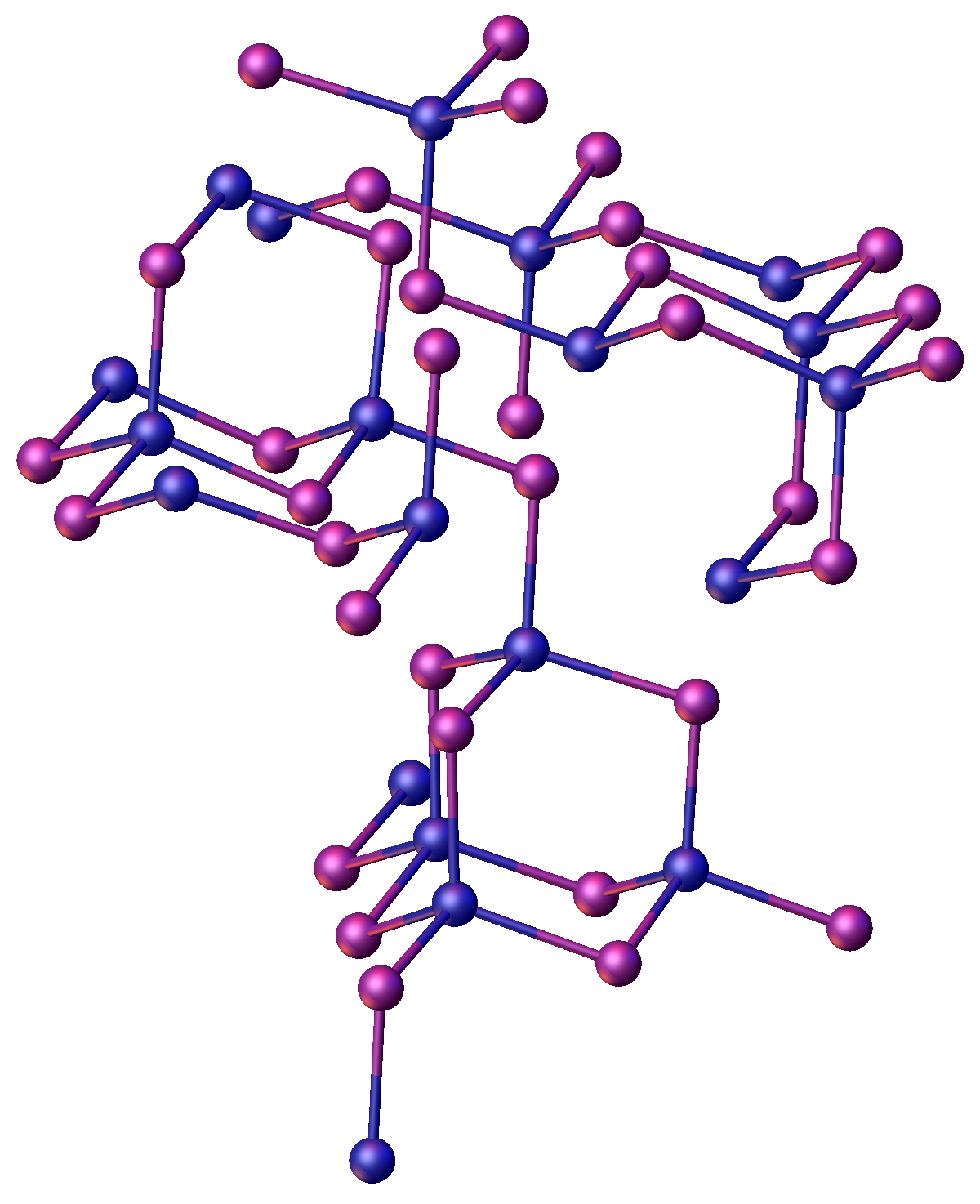
- Zinc bromide

Names
- IUPAC name Zinc bromide
- Other names Zinc(II) bromide, Zinc dibromide

Identifiers
CAS Number	7699-45-8
3D model (JSmol)	Interactive image
ChemSpider	22790
ECHA InfoCard	100.028.836
PubChem CID	24375
RTECS number	ZH1150000
UNII	OO7ZBU9703
CompTox Dashboard (EPA)	DTXSID8052512
- InChI: InChI=1S/2BrH.Zn/h2*1H;/q;;+2/p-2 Key: VNDYJBBGRKZCSX-UHFFFAOYSA-L; InChI=1/2BrH.Zn/h2*1H;/q;;+2/p-2 Key: VNDYJBBGRKZCSX-NUQVWONBAG
- SMILES: Br[Zn]Br

Properties
Chemical formula	ZnBr_{2}
Molar mass	225.198 g/mol
Appearance	white crystalline powder hygroscopic
Density	4.20 g/cm^{3} (20 °C); 4.22 g/cm^{3} (25 °C)
Melting point	394 °C (741 °F; 667 K)
Boiling point	697 °C (1,287 °F; 970 K)
Solubility in water	388 g/100 mL (0 °C); 675 g/100 mL (100 °C, for the anhydrous material)
Solubility	very soluble in alcohol, ether, acetone, tetrahydrofuran
Refractive index (n_{D})	1.5452

Hazards
NFPA 704 (fire diamond)	3 0 0
Flash point	Non-flammable
Safety data sheet (SDS)	External MSDS

Related compounds
Other anions	Zinc fluoride, Zinc chloride, Zinc iodide
Other cations	Cadmium bromide, Mercury(II) bromide, Calcium bromide
- Except where otherwise noted, data are given for materials in their standard state (at 25 °C [77 °F], 100 kPa). verify (what is ?) Infobox references

Zinc bromide (ZnBr_{2}) is an inorganic compound with the chemical formula ZnBr_{2}. It is a colourless salt that shares many properties with zinc chloride (ZnCl_{2}), namely a high solubility in water forming acidic solutions, and good solubility in organic solvents. It is hygroscopic and forms a dihydrate ZnBr_{2}·2H_{2}O.

== Production ==
ZnBr_{2} · 2H_{2}O is prepared by treating zinc oxide or zinc metal with hydrobromic acid.

ZnO + 2 HBr + H_{2}O → ZnBr_{2}·2H_{2}O
Zn + 2 HBr → ZnBr_{2} + H_{2}

The anhydrous material can be produced by dehydration of the dihydrate with hot CO_{2} or by reaction of zinc metal and bromine. Sublimation in a stream of hydrogen bromide also gives the anhydrous derivative.

== Structure ==
ZnBr_{2} crystallizes in the same structure as ZnI_{2}: four tetrahedral Zn centers share three vertices to form “super-tetrahedra” of nominal composition {Zn_{4}Br_{10}}^{2−}, which are linked by their vertices to form a three-dimensional structure. The dihydrate ZnBr_{2} · 2H_{2}O can be described as ([Zn(H_{2}O)_{6}]^{2+})^{2}([Zn_{2}Br_{6}]^{2-}).

Gaseous ZnBr_{2} is linear in accordance with VSEPR theory with a Zn–Br bond length of 221 pm.

== Uses ==
Zinc bromide is mainly used in servicing oil and natural gas wells, solutions of zinc bromide are used to displace drilling mud when switching from the drilling phase to the completion phase or in well workover operations. The extremely dense brine solution gives the fluid its weight of 20 pounds/gallon, which makes it especially useful in holding back flammable oil and gas particles in high pressure wells. However, the high acidity and osmolarity cause corrosion and handling problems. Crews must be issued slicker suits and rubber boots because the fluid is so dehydrating.

It is the electrolyte in the zinc–bromide battery.

Zinc bromide solutions can be used as a transparent shield against radiation. The space between two glass panes is filled with a strong aqueous solution of zinc bromide with a very high density, to be used as a window on a hot cell. This type of window has the advantage over lead glass in that it will not darken as a result of exposure to radiation. All glass will darken slowly over time due to radiation, however this is especially true in a hot cell, where exceptional levels of radiation are present. The advantage of an aqueous salt solution is that any radiation damage will last less than a millisecond, so the shield will undergo self-repair.

=== In the laboratory ===
In organic chemistry anhydrous ZnBr_{2} is sometimes used as a Lewis acid.

== Safety ==
Safety considerations are similar to those for zinc chloride, for which the toxic dose for humans is 3–5 g.

== See also ==
- Zinc chloride
- Zinc fluoride
- Zinc iodide
- Cadmium bromide
