= Mercury(II) fluoride =

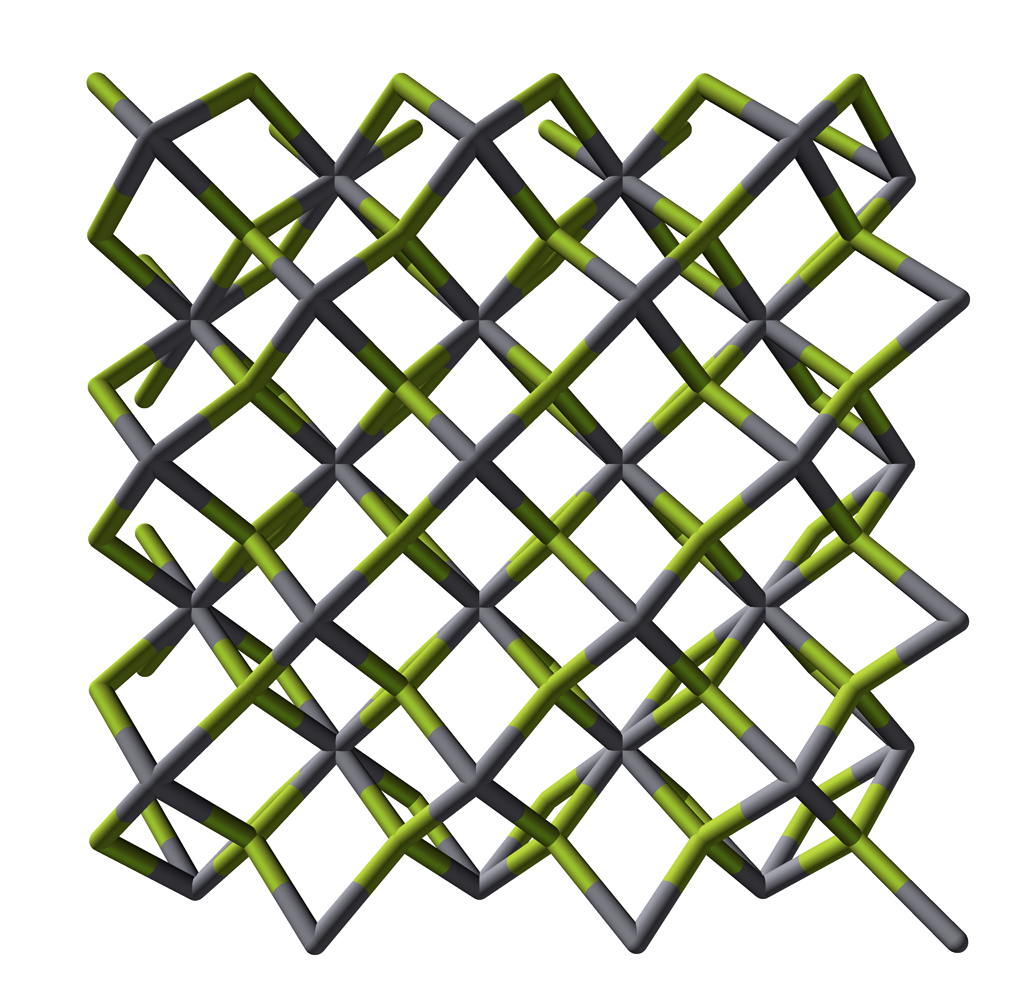
- Mercury(II) fluoride

Names
- IUPAC name Mercury(II) fluoride
- Other names Mercuric fluoride

Identifiers
CAS Number	7783-39-3
3D model (JSmol)	Interactive image
ChemSpider	74189
ECHA InfoCard	100.029.085
EC Number	231-994-6
PubChem CID	82209
UNII	1EGI9VXN9A
CompTox Dashboard (EPA)	DTXSID601337587
- InChI: InChI=1S/2FH.Hg/h2*1H;/q;;+2/p-2 Key: FMSYTQMJOCCCQS-UHFFFAOYSA-L
- SMILES: F[Hg]F

Properties
Chemical formula	HgF_{2}
Molar mass	238.587 g/mol
Appearance	hygroscopic white cubic crystals
Density	8.95 g/cm^{3}
Melting point	decomposes at 645°C
Solubility in water	reacts
Magnetic susceptibility (χ)	−62.0·10^{−6} cm^{3}/mol

Structure
Crystal structure	Fluorite (cubic), cF12
Space group	Fm3̅m, No. 225
Lattice constant	a = 5.54 Å

Hazards
- Occupational safety and health (OHS/OSH)
Main hazards	highly toxic
- GHS labelling
Pictograms	(GHS06: Toxic) (GHS08: Health hazard) (GHS09: Environmental hazard)
Hazard statements	H300, H310, H330, H373, H410
Precautionary statements	P301+P310, P304+P340, P320, P330, P360, P361, P405, P501
NFPA 704 (fire diamond)	4 0 0

Related compounds
Other anions	Mercury(II) chloride Mercury(II) bromide Mercury(II) iodide
Other cations	Mercury(I) fluoride Zinc fluoride Cadmium fluoride Thallium(I) fluoride
- Except where otherwise noted, data are given for materials in their standard state (at 25 °C [77 °F], 100 kPa). verify (what is ?) Infobox references

Mercury(II) fluoride is a chemical compound made up of mercury and fluorine atoms with chemical formula HgF_{2}. It is produced by the reaction of mercury(II) oxide and hydrogen fluoride, and is usually encountered as the hydrated form HgF_{2}·2H_{2}O. It is used as a fluorinating agent in organic chemistry.

== Synthesis ==
Mercury(II) fluoride is most commonly produced by the reaction of mercury(II) oxide and hydrogen fluoride:

HgO + 2 HF → HgF_{2} + H_{2}O

Mercury(II) fluoride can also be produced through the fluorination of mercury(II) chloride:

HgCl_{2} + F_{2} → HgF_{2} + Cl_{2}

or of mercury(II) oxide:

2 HgO + 2 F_{2} → 2 HgF_{2} + O_{2}

with oxygen as byproduct.

== Hydrates ==
Mercury(II) fluoride normally exists in the form of the dihydrate, HgF_{2}·2H_{2}O.

== Structure ==
Under ambient conditions, anhydrous mercury(II) fluoride adopts the fluorite structure, like many other compounds of composition MF_{2} (M = metal). This type of structure is cubic, with each atom of mercury being surrounded by 8 fluorine atoms in a cubic configuration, and each atom of fluorine being surrounded by 4 mercury atoms in a tetrahedral configuration. At high pressures, however, it undergoes a phase transition, starting at 2.5 GPa and being completed at 4.7 GPa, to a cotunnite-type structure, which is monoclinic. This structure persists to at least 63 GPa.

The dihydrate adopts an orthorhombic structure.

== Reactions and applications ==
In water, mercury(II) fluoride almost completely decomposes.

At high pressure, mercury(II) fluoride is predicted to react with fluorine or xenon difluoride to form mercury(IV) fluoride.

Mercury(II) fluoride is a selective fluorination agent. It has been found to be effective at many of the same reactions that silver fluoride or mercury(I) fluoride are, such as the fluorination of organobromine or organoiodine compounds, with higher yields and reduced reaction times. It has also been found to fluorinate triphenylacetic acid, triphenyl ethylene, and triethyl phosphite.
