= Coccinite =

Mercury iodide mineral

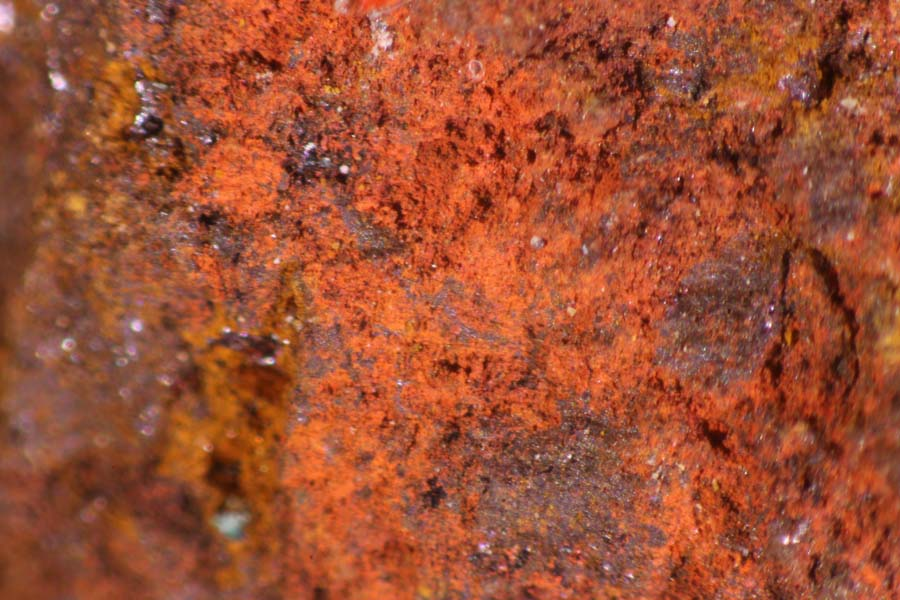
- Coccinite, from Backofen Mine, Rhineland-Palatinate, Germany

General
- Category: Halide mineral
- Formula: HgI_{2}
- IMA symbol: Cci
- Strunz classification: 3.AB.10
- Crystal system: Tetragonal
- Crystal class: Ditetragonal dipyramidal (4/mmm); H-M symbol: (4/m 2/m 2/m)
- Space group: P4_{2}/nmc
- Unit cell: a = 4.376 Å, c = 12.41 Å, Z = 2

Identification
- Colour: Orange-red
- Cleavage: Good on {001}
- Mohs scale hardness: 2
- Streak: Orange
- Diaphaneity: Translucent
- Specific gravity: 3.17 (calculated)
- Optical properties: Uniaxial (-)
- Refractive index: 2.684 (avg)
- Birefringence: 0.193
- Other characteristics: Volatile at room temperature, toxic

Coccinite is a rare mercury iodide mineral with chemical formula of HgI_{2}, mercury(II) iodide. It was first discovered in Casas Viejas, Mexico; it has also been reported from Broken Hill, New South Wales, and from a uranium mine in Thuringia and old mercury workings in the Rhineland-Palatinate in Germany. At the Thuringia deposit the mineral occurs as a sublimation product resulting from fires associated with pyrite-bearing graptolitic slate.

== Discovery ==
The discovery was announced, by a man mentioned in Comptes rendus only as del Rio, in the journal of the Mexico City School of Mining. The news spread through the reading that journal and direct letters of del Rio. In the subsequent years, the discovery was mentioned several times. One of the earliest notes of the discovery is a translation of a letter of del Rio to Freiesleben. In 1839, it was described as lemon coloured spots in the sandstone of Casas Viejas. This description was also given in a Spanish book printed in 1844. In 1836, the communication of Yniestra to Arago about a discovery made by del Rio was published in Comptes rendus as a short paper. This publication recounts that a mineral sample was deposited at the school of mines by a Mr. Jose Casas Viejas from the Querétaro province, and that the mineral had a red-brown color. In 1861, the book A Glossary of Mineralogy by Henry William Bristow stated that it had been found in Casas Viejas in Mexico as reddish brown particles on mercury selenide. Shortly after, in 1862, a book about chemical technology named the Mexican region of Casas Viejas as the only location where the mineral was found.
