= Zinc iodide =

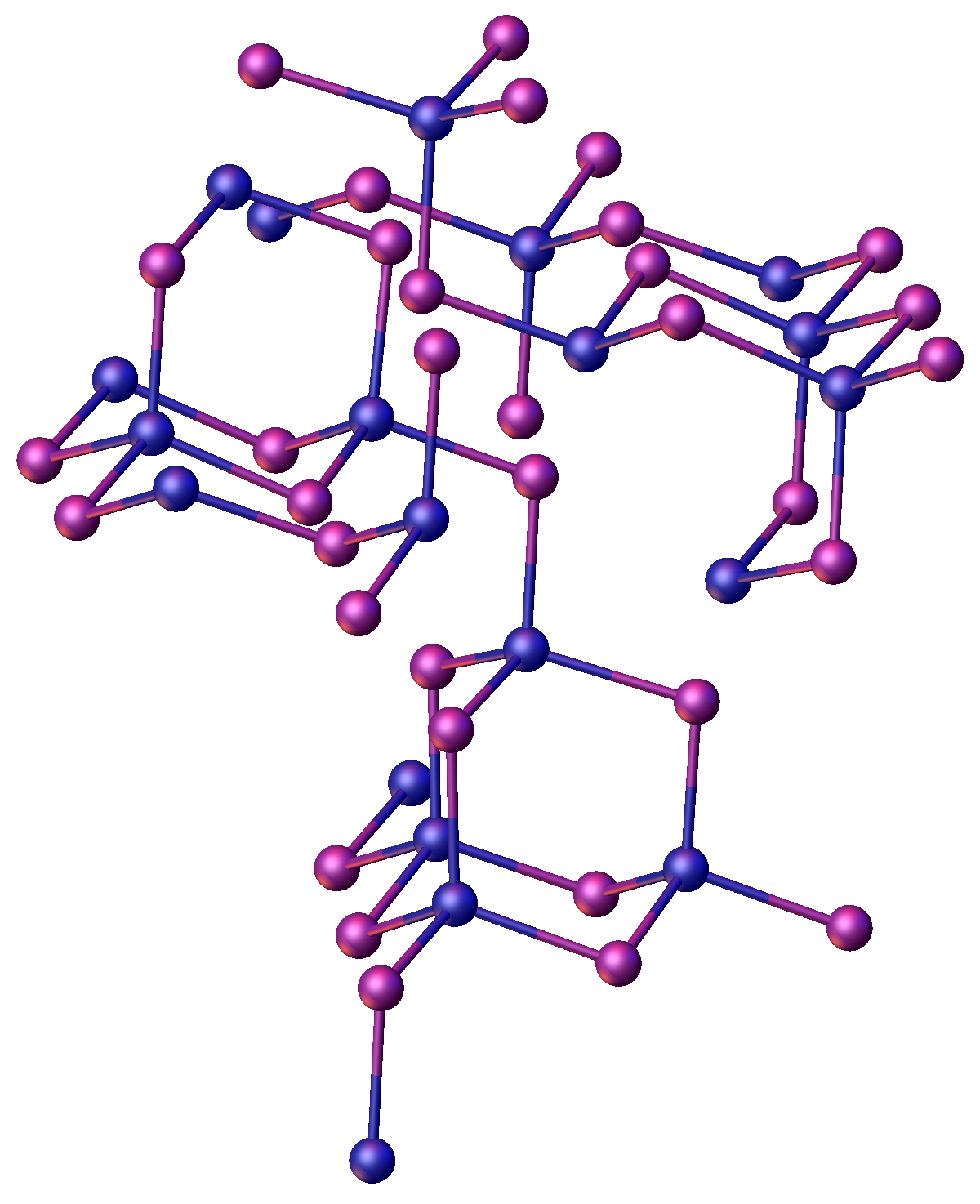

Names
- IUPAC name Zinc iodide
- Other names Zinc(II) iodide

Identifiers
| CAS Number | 10139-47-6 |
| 3D model (JSmol) | Interactive image |
| ChemSpider | 59657 |
| ECHA InfoCard | 100.030.347 |
| PubChem CID | 66278 |
| UNII | 762R7A0O0B |
| CompTox Dashboard (EPA) | DTXSID5064968 |
- InChI: InChI=1S/2HI.Zn/h2*1H;/q;;+2/p-2 Key: UAYWVJHJZHQCIE-UHFFFAOYSA-L; InChI=1/2HI.Zn/h2*1H;/q;;+2/p-2 Key: UAYWVJHJZHQCIE-NUQVWONBAB
- SMILES: I[Zn]I

Properties
| Chemical formula | ZnI_{2} |
| Molar mass | 319.19 g/mol |
| Appearance | white solid |
| Density | 4.74 g/cm^{3} |
| Melting point | 446 °C (835 °F; 719 K) |
| Boiling point | 1,150 °C (2,100 °F; 1,420 K) decomposes |
| Solubility in water | 450 g/100mL (20 °C) |
| Magnetic susceptibility (χ) | −98.0·10^{−6} cm^{3}/mol |

Structure
| Crystal structure | Tetragonal, tI96 |
| Space group | I4_{1}/acd, No. 142 |

Hazards
| Flash point | 625 °C (1,157 °F; 898 K) |
| Safety data sheet (SDS) | External MSDS |

Related compounds
| Other anions | Zinc fluoride Zinc chloride Zinc bromide |
| Other cations | Cadmium iodide Mercury(I) iodide |
- Except where otherwise noted, data are given for materials in their standard state (at 25 °C [77 °F], 100 kPa). verify (what is ?) Infobox references

Zinc iodide is the inorganic compound with the formula ZnI_{2}. It exists both in anhydrous form and as a dihydrate. Both are white and readily absorb water from the atmosphere. It has no major application.

== Preparation ==
It can be prepared by the direct reaction of zinc and iodine in water or refluxing ether:

Zn + I_{2} → ZnI_{2}

Absent a solvent, the elements do not combine directly at room temperature.

== Structure as solid, gas, and in solution ==
The structure of solid ZnI_{2} is unusual relative to the dichloride. While zinc centers are tetrahedrally coordinated, as in ZnCl_{2}, groups of four of these tetrahedra share three vertices to form “super-tetrahedra” of composition {Zn_{4}I_{10}}, which are linked by their vertices to form a three-dimensional structure. These "super-tetrahedra" are similar to the P_{4}O_{10} structure.

Molecular ZnI_{2} is linear as predicted by VSEPR theory with a Zn-I bond length of 238 pm.

In aqueous solution the following have been detected: Zn(H_{2}O)_{6}^{2+}, [ZnI(H_{2}O)_{5}]^{+}, tetrahedral ZnI_{2}(H_{2}O)_{2}, ZnI_{3}(H_{2}O)^{−}, and ZnI_{4}^{2−}.

== Applications ==
- Zinc iodide is often used as an x-ray opaque penetrant in industrial radiography to improve the contrast between the damage and intact composite.
- United States patent 4,109,065 describes a rechargeable aqueous zinc-halogen cell that includes an aqueous electrolytic solution containing a zinc salt selected from the class consisting of zinc bromide, zinc iodide, and mixtures thereof, in both positive and negative electrode compartments.
- In combination with osmium tetroxide, ZnI_{2} is used as a stain in electron microscopy.
- As a Lewis acid, zinc iodide catalyzes for the conversion of methanol to triptane and hexamethylbenzene.
- It can be used as a topical antiseptic.
