= Cadmium chloride =

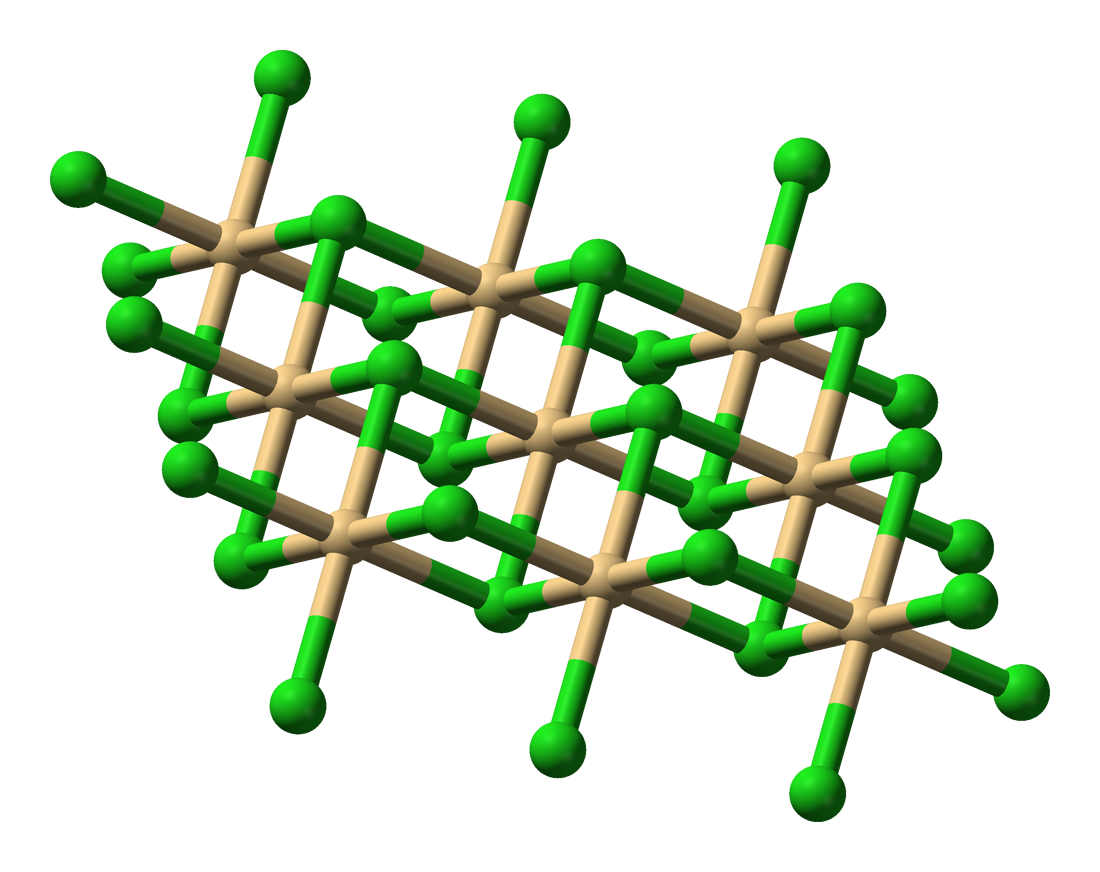
Ball-and-stick model of cadmium chloride
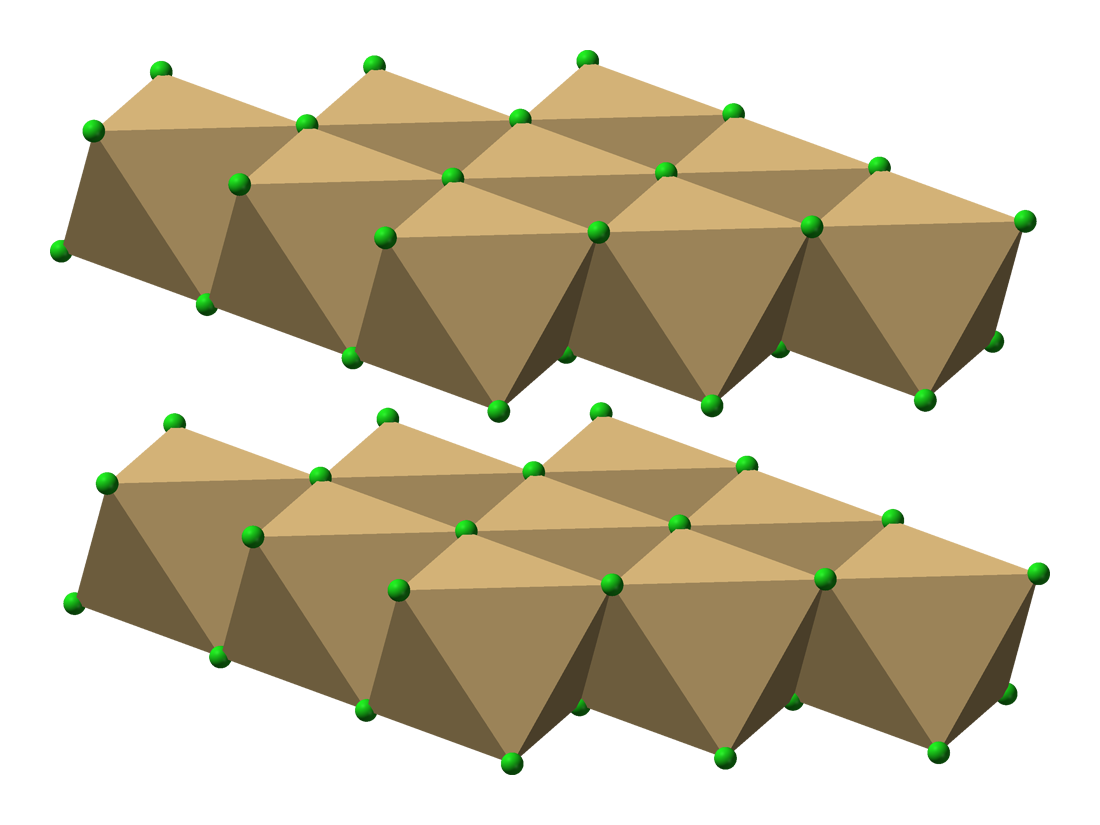
Cadmium chloride in polyhedron shape
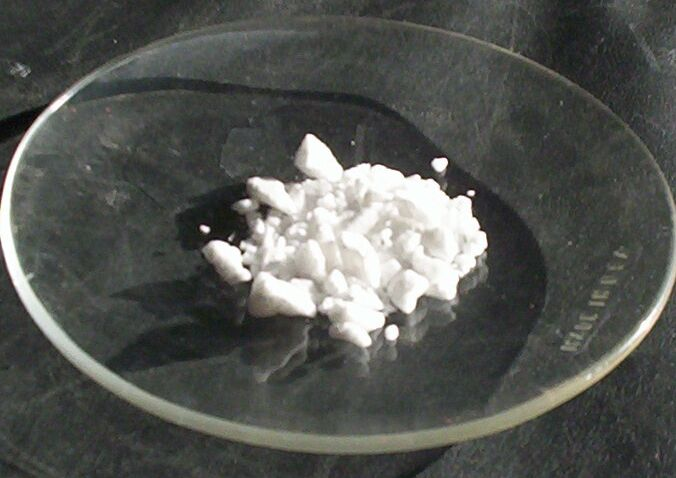
- Cadmium chloride hemipentahydrate

Names
- IUPAC name Cadmium dichloride
- Other names Cadmium(II) chloride

Identifiers
CAS Number	10108-64-2; (hemipentahydrate): 7790-78-5; (monohydrate): 35658-65-2
3D model (JSmol)	Interactive image; (hemipentahydrate): Interactive image; (monohydrate): Interactive image
Beilstein Reference	3902835
ChEBI	CHEBI:35456
ChemSpider	23035; (hemipentahydrate): 17339510; (monohydrate): 4447434
ECHA InfoCard	100.030.256
EC Number	233-296-7; (hemipentahydrate): 813-696-3
Gmelin Reference	912918
KEGG	C15233
PubChem CID	24947; (hemipentahydrate): 24978551; (monohydrate): 5284356
RTECS number	EV0175000
UNII	J6K4F9V3BA; (hemipentahydrate): 2R707SXC9H
UN number	2570
CompTox Dashboard (EPA)	DTXSID6020226; (hemipentahydrate): DTXSID4040183
- InChI: InChI=1S/Cd.2ClH/h;2*1H/q+2;;/p-2 Key: YKYOUMDCQGMQQO-UHFFFAOYSA-L; InChI=1/Cd.2ClH/h;2*1H/q+2;;/p-2 Key: YKYOUMDCQGMQQO-NUQVWONBAG; (hemipentahydrate): InChI=1S/2Cd.4ClH.5H2O/h;;4*1H;5*1H2/q2*+2;;;;;;;;;/p-4 Key: DZVRGWYMCGLNKJ-UHFFFAOYSA-J; (monohydrate): InChI=1S/Cd.2ClH.H2O/h;2*1H;1H2/q+2;;;/p-2 Key: OISMQLUZKQIKII-UHFFFAOYSA-L
- SMILES: Cl[Cd]Cl; (hemipentahydrate): O.O.O.O.O.[Cl-].[Cl-].[Cl-].[Cl-].[Cd+2].[Cd+2]; (monohydrate): O.[Cl-].[Cl-].[Cd+2]

Properties
Chemical formula	CdCl_{2}
Molar mass	183.31 g·mol^{−1}
Appearance	White solid, hygroscopic
Odor	Odorless
Density	4.047 g/cm^{3} (anhydrous); 3.26 g/cm^{3} (monohydrate); 3.327 g/cm^{3} (Hemipentahydrate)
Melting point	568 °C (1,054 °F; 841 K)
Boiling point	964 °C (1,767 °F; 1,237 K)
Solubility in water	Hemipentahydrate: 79.5 g/100 mL (−10 °C); 90 g/100 mL (0 °C); Monohydrate: 119.6 g/100 mL (25 °C); 134.3 g/100 mL (40 °C); 134.2 g/100 mL (60 °C); 147 g/100 mL (100 °C)
Solubility	Soluble in alcohol, selenium(IV) oxychloride, benzonitrile Insoluble in ether, acetone
Solubility in pyridine	4.6 g/kg (0 °C); 7.9 g/kg (4 °C); 8.1 g/kg (15 °C); 6.7 g/kg (30 °C); 5 g/kg (100 °C)
Solubility in ethanol	1.3 g/100 g (10 °C); 1.48 g/100 g (20 °C); 1.91 g/100 g (40 °C); 2.53 g/100 g (70 °C)
Solubility in dimethyl sulfoxide	18 g/100 g (25 °C)
Vapor pressure	0.01 kPa (471 °C); 0.1 kPa (541 °C)
Magnetic susceptibility (χ)	−6.87·10^{−5} cm^{3}/mol
Viscosity	2.31 cP (597 °C); 1.87 cP (687 °C)

Structure
Crystal structure	Rhombohedral, hR9 (anhydrous); Monoclinic (hemipentahydrate)
Space group	R3̅m, No. 166 (anhydrous)
Point group	3̅ 2/m (anhydrous)
Lattice constant	a = 3.846 Å, c = 17.479 Å (anhydrous) α = 90°, β = 90°, γ = 120°

Thermochemistry
Heat capacity (C)	74.7 J/mol·K
Std molar entropy (S^{⦵}_{298})	115.3 J/mol·K
Std enthalpy of formation (Δ_{f}H^{⦵}_{298})	−391.5 kJ/mol
Gibbs free energy (Δ_{f}G^{⦵})	−343.9 kJ/mol

Hazards
- GHS labelling
Pictograms	(GHS06: Toxic) (GHS08: Health hazard) (GHS09: Environmental hazard)
Signal word	Danger
Hazard statements	H301, H330, H340, H350, H360, H372, H410
Precautionary statements	P210, P260, P273, P284, P301+P310, P310
NFPA 704 (fire diamond)	4 0 0
- Lethal dose or concentration (LD, LC)
LD_{50} (median dose)	94 mg/kg (rats, oral); 60 mg/kg (mouse, oral); 88 mg/kg (rat, oral)
- NIOSH (US health exposure limits)
PEL (Permissible)	[1910.1027] TWA 0.005 mg/m^{3} (as Cd)
REL (Recommended)	Ca
IDLH (Immediate danger)	Ca [9 mg/m^{3} (as Cd)]
Safety data sheet (SDS)	External MSDS

Related compounds
Other anions	Cadmium fluoride Cadmium bromide Cadmium iodide
Other cations	Zinc chloride Mercury(II) chloride Calcium chloride
- Except where otherwise noted, data are given for materials in their standard state (at 25 °C [77 °F], 100 kPa). verify (what is ?) Infobox references

Cadmium chloride is a white crystalline compound of cadmium and chloride, with the formula CdCl_{2}. This salt is a hygroscopic solid that is highly soluble in water and slightly soluble in alcohol. The crystal structure of cadmium chloride (described below), is a reference for describing other crystal structures. Also known are CdCl_{2}·H_{2}O and the hemipentahydrate CdCl_{2}·2.5H_{2}O.

== Structure ==
=== Anhydrous ===
Anhydrous cadmium chloride forms a layered structure consisting of octahedral Cd^{2+} centers linked with chloride ligands. Cadmium iodide, CdI_{2}, has a similar structure, but the iodide ions are arranged in a HCP lattice, whereas in CdCl_{2} the chloride ions are arranged in a CCP lattice.

=== Hydrates ===
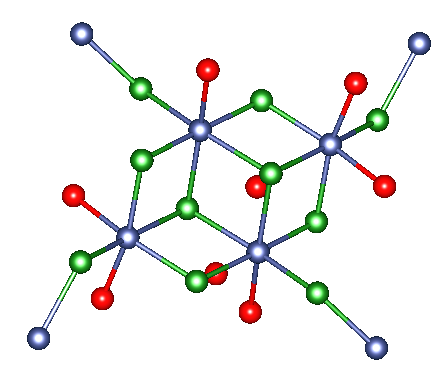
Subunit of CdCl_{2}(H_{2}O)_{2.5}. Color code: red = O (of H_{2}O), blue = Cd, green = Cl.

The anhydrous form absorbs moisture from the air to form various hydrates. Three of these hydrates have been examined by X-ray crystallography.

Crystallographic data for the 3 hydrates of cadmium chloride
Compound	CdCl_{2}·H_{2}O	CdCl_{2}·2.5H_{2}O	CdCl_{2}·4H_{2}O
Molar mass (g/mol)	201.33	228.36	255.38
Crystal Structure	Orthorhombic	Monoclinic	Orthorhombic
Space Group	Pnma	P2_{1}/n	P2_{1}2_{1}2_{1}
Lattice constant a (Å)	9.25	9.21	12.89
Lattice constant b (Å)	3.78	11.88	7.28
Lattice constant c (Å)	11.89	10.08	15.01
β		93.5°	
Density (g/cm^{3})	3.26	2.84	2.41
Comment	Interconnected CdCl_{3}(H_{2}O) octahedra		Distorted trans-[CdCl_{2}(H_{2}O)_{4}] octahedra

== Chemical properties ==
Cadmium chloride dissolves well in water and other polar solvents. It is a mild Lewis acid.

CdCl_{2} + 2 Cl^{−} → [CdCl_{4}]^{2−}

Solutions of equimolar cadmium chloride and potassium chloride give potassium cadmium trichloride. With large cations, it is possible to isolate the trigonal bipyramidal [CdCl_{5}]^{3−} ion.

Cadmium metal is soluble in molten cadmium chloride, produced by heating cadmium chloride above 568 °C. Upon cooling, the metal precipitates.

== Preparation ==
Anhydrous cadmium chloride can be prepared by the reaction of hydrochloric acid and cadmium metal or cadmium oxide.

Cd + 2 HCl → CdCl_{2} + H_{2}

The anhydrous salt can also be prepared from anhydrous cadmium acetate using hydrogen chloride or acetyl chloride.

Industrially, it is produced by the reaction of molten cadmium and chlorine gas at 600 °C.

The monohydrate, hemipentahydrate, and tetrahydrate can be produced by evaporation of the solution of cadmium chloride at 35, 20, and 0 °C respectively. The hemipentahydrate and tetrahydrate release water in air.

== Uses ==
Cadmium chloride is used for the preparation of cadmium sulfide, used as "cadmium yellow", a brilliant-yellow stable inorganic pigment.

CdCl_{2} + H_{2}S → CdS + 2 HCl

In the laboratory, anhydrous CdCl_{2} can be used for the preparation of organocadmium compounds of the type R_{2}Cd, where R is an aryl or a primary alkyl. These were once used in the synthesis of ketones from acyl chlorides:

CdCl_{2} + 2 RMgX → R_{2}Cd + MgCl_{2} + MgX_{2}

R_{2}Cd + 2R'COCl → 2R'COR + CdCl_{2}

Such reagents have largely been supplanted by organocopper compounds, which are much less toxic.

Cadmium chloride is also used for photocopying, dyeing and electroplating.

It was used in the first experiments for detecting neutrinos, the Cowan–Reines neutrino experiment.

Like all cadmium compounds, CdCl_{2} is highly toxic and appropriate safety precautions must be taken when handling it.
