= Cadmium bromide =

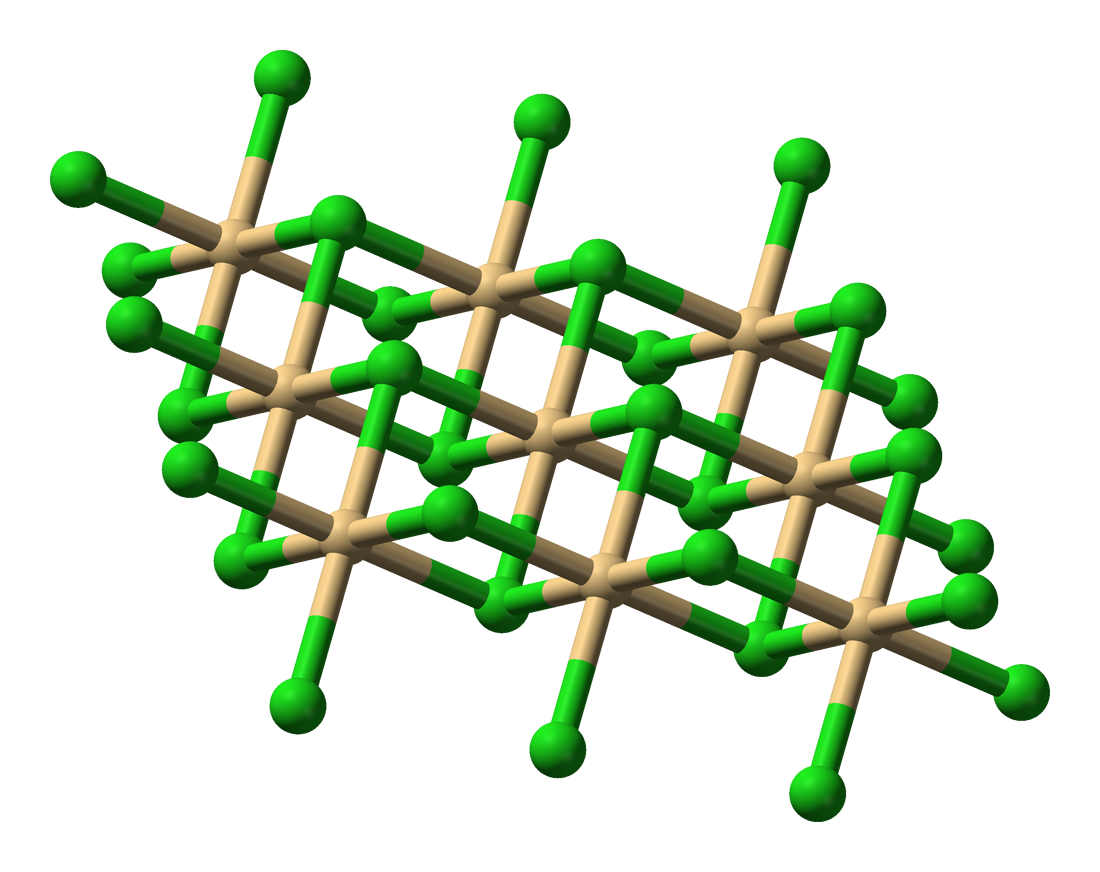
- Cadmium bromide

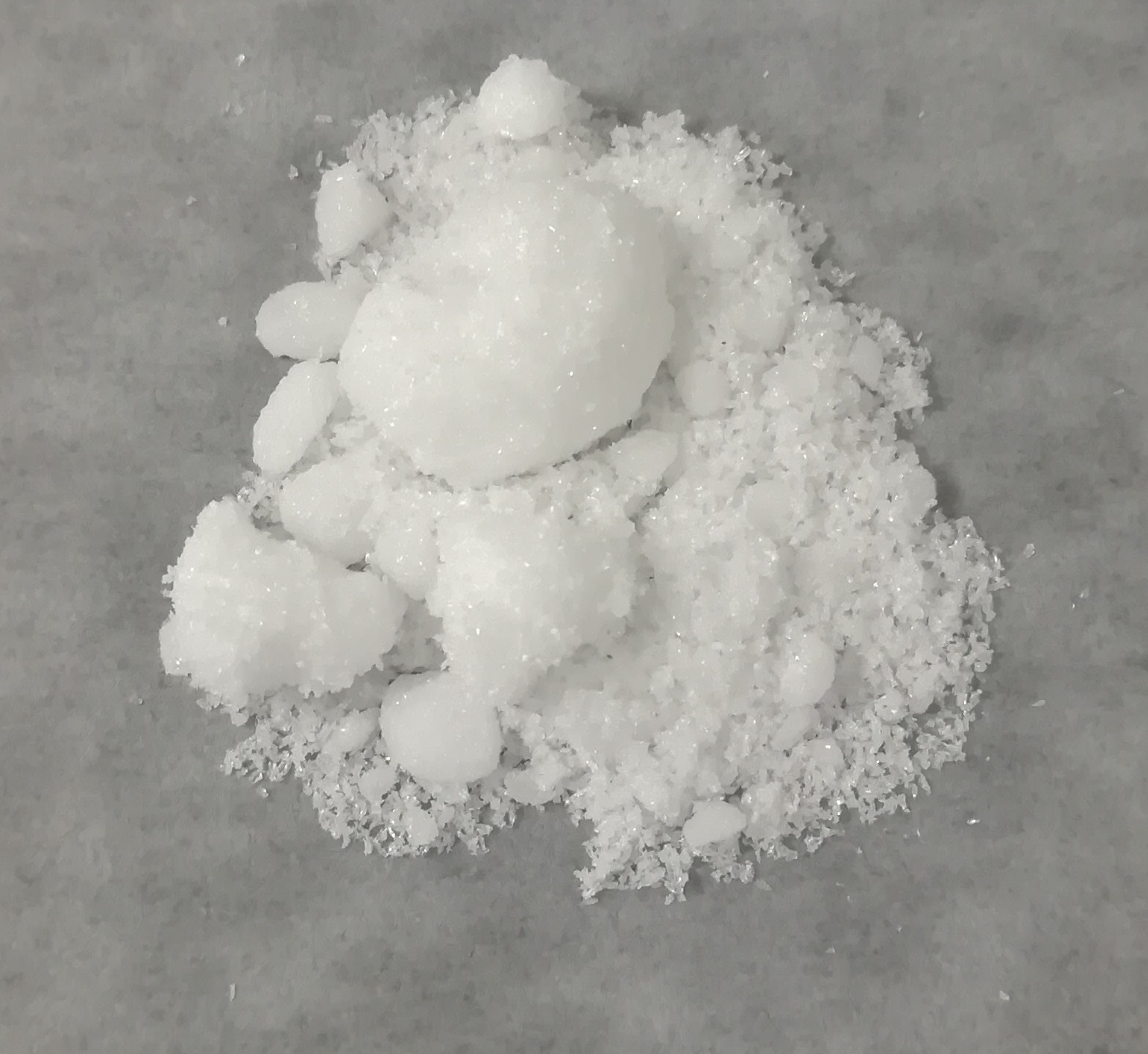

Names
- IUPAC name Cadmium(II) bromide
- Other names Cadmium dibromide

Identifiers
CAS Number	7789-42-6; 13464-92-1 (tetrahydrate)
3D model (JSmol)	Interactive image
ChemSpider	23011
ECHA InfoCard	100.029.241
EC Number	232-165-1
PubChem CID	24609
RTECS number	EU9935000
UNII	7726AXS0WH
CompTox Dashboard (EPA)	DTXSID30895027
- InChI: InChI=1S/2BrH.Cd/h2*1H;/q;;+2/p-2 Key: KPWJBEFBFLRCLH-UHFFFAOYSA-L; InChI=1/2BrH.Cd/h2*1H;/q;;+2/p-2 Key: KPWJBEFBFLRCLH-NUQVWONBAB
- SMILES: Br[Cd]Br

Properties
Chemical formula	CdBr_{2}
Molar mass	272.22 g/mol
Appearance	white solid
Density	5.192 g/cm^{3}, solid
Melting point	568 °C (1,054 °F; 841 K)
Boiling point	844 °C (1,551 °F; 1,117 K)
Solubility in water	56.3 g/100 mL (0 °C); 98.8 g/100 mL (20 °C); 160 g/100 mL (100 °C)
Solubility	soluble in alcohol, ether, acetone and liquid ammonia.
Magnetic susceptibility (χ)	−87.3·10^{−6} cm^{3}/mol

Structure
Crystal structure	Rhombohedral, hr9, SpaceGroup = R-3m, No. 166

Hazards
- GHS labelling
Pictograms	(GHS07: Exclamation mark) (GHS09: Environmental hazard)
Signal word	Warning
Hazard statements	H302, H312, H332, H410
Precautionary statements	P220, P273, P280, P501
NFPA 704 (fire diamond)	3 0 0
- Lethal dose or concentration (LD, LC)
LD_{50} (median dose)	225 mg/kg, oral (rat)
- NIOSH (US health exposure limits)
PEL (Permissible)	[1910.1027] TWA 0.005 mg/m^{3} (as Cd)
REL (Recommended)	Ca
IDLH (Immediate danger)	Ca [9 mg/m^{3} (as Cd)]

Related compounds
Other anions	Cadmium chloride, Cadmium iodide
Other cations	Zinc bromide, Calcium bromide, Magnesium bromide
- Except where otherwise noted, data are given for materials in their standard state (at 25 °C [77 °F], 100 kPa). verify (what is ?) Infobox references

Cadmium bromide is the inorganic compound with the formula CdBr_{2}. It is a white hygroscopic solid. It also can be obtained as a mono- and tetrahydrate. It has few applications.

== Preparation and structure ==
Cadmium bromide is prepared by heating cadmium with bromine vapor. The tetrahydrate has been obtained by crystallization of the dibromide from aqueous solution. At 3.04 g/cm^{3}, it is much less dense than the anhydrous material. According to X-ray crystallography, the tetrahydrate is a polymer of CdBr_{2}(H_{2}O)_{2} with bridging bromide ligands. There are two interstitial water molecules
