= Edoylerite =

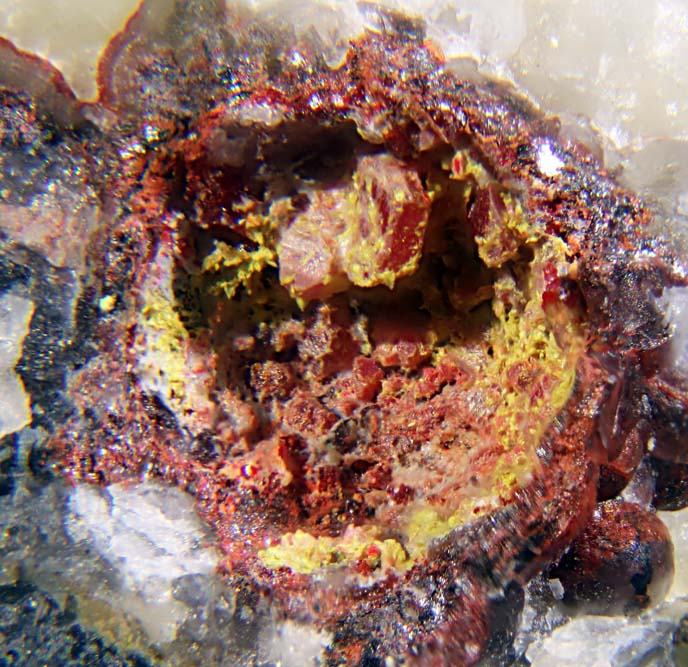
- Yellow acicular crystals of the very rare mercury mineral edoylerite from the Clear Ceek mine (Clear Creek Claim, Goat Mountain, New Idria, San Benito County, California, United States of America), famous for its paragenesis of very rare Hg minerals, associated to red cinnabar. Edoylerite is a mercury chromate. Ex.Dr Hartel collection.

General
- Category: Chromate
- Formula: Hg_{3}^{2+}Cr^{6+}O_{4}S_{2}
- IMA symbol: Eoy
- Crystal system: Monoclinic
- Space group: P2_{1}/a
- Unit cell: a = 7.524 Å, b = 14.819 Å c = 7.443 Å; α=90.00° β=118.72°, γ=90.00°

Identification
- Color: Canary yellow to orangish yellow
- Crystal habit: Acicular to Prismatic crystals
- Cleavage: Distinct/Good {010}. Fair {101}
- Fracture: Sub-Conchoidal
- Tenacity: Brittle and Inflexible
- Luster: Adamantine
- Streak: yellow
- Diaphaneity: Opaque masses to transparent or translucent individual crystals
- Specific gravity: 7.11
- Density: 7.13 g/cm^{3}
- Optical properties: Biaxial
- Birefringence: Weak
- Pleochroism: Weak with light grey colors
- Ultraviolet fluorescence: Nonfluorescent

Edoylerite is a rare mercury-containing mineral. Edoylerite was first discovered in 1961 by Edward H. Oyler, whom the mineral is named after, in a meter-sized boulder at the Clear Creek claim in San Benito County, California. The Clear Creek claim is located near the abandoned Clear Creek mercury mine. The material from the boulder underwent several analyses including, X-ray powder diffraction (XRD), a single crystal study, and a preliminary electron microprobe analysis (EMA). Using these analyses it was determined that this was a new mineral but the nature of the material at the time prevented further investigation. It was not until 1986, with the discovery of crystals large enough for a crystal structure determination and a sufficient quantity for a full mineralogical characterization, that the study was renewed. The new edoylerite crystals were found in the same area at the Clear Creek claim but were situated in an outcrop of silica-carbonate rock. This silica-carbonate rock was mineralized by cinnabar following the hydrothermal alteration of the serpentinite in the rock. Edoylerite is a primary alteration product of cinnabar. Though found with cinnabar, the crystals of edoylerite do not typically exceed 0.5mm in length. The ideal chemical formula for edoylerite is Hg_{3}^{2+}Cr^{6+}O_{4}S_{2}

== Occurrence ==
Edoylerite is found in association with cinnabar, terlinguaite, mercury, wattersite, deanesmithite, and opal. When found with these minerals, it means that the edoylerite crystals form on the surface of the other minerals after the mercury mineralization. The minerals formed during the mercury mineralization, in rough order of abundance, are cinnabar, mercury, edgarbaileyite, metacinnabar, montroydite, eglestonite, calomel, an unidentified yellow massive cryptocrystalline mercury mineral, edoylerite, wattersite, giannellaite, mosesite, deanesmithite, and one occurrence of szymanskiite. Edoylerite most commonly occurs with cinnabar and is a primary alteration product of cinnabar. Edoylerite is a rare mineral, as it has only been found at one locality, the Clear Creek claim in San Benito County, California near the Clear Creek mine. At the edoylerite locality, the host hock is composed of quartz, chalcedony, opal, ferroan magnesite, dolomite, goethite, and minor chlorite. In spite of a considerable search, only microgram quantities of edoylerite have been found since the mineral was originally discovered in 1961.

== Physical properties ==
Edoylerite is a canary yellow to orangish-yellow mineral, with an adamantine luster. The crystals are transparent to translucent, but a large grouping of the, massive, material appears opaque. The average length of a crystal is 0.2mm. Edoylerite occurs as acicular to prismatic crystals that are elongated on the [101] axis which gives it a slender, needle-like crystal shape or a tabular/platy crystal shape. Its crystals are characterized by the {010}, {11̅1}, {001}, and {101} faces. Edoylerite is brittle and inflexible with very good cleavage along the {010} and a fair cleavage on {101} planes. It exhibits subconchoidal fractures and is nonfluorescent and nonmagnetic. The measured density of edoylerite is 7.13 g/cm^{3}.

== Optical properties ==
Edoylerite is optically biaxial, which means it will refract light along two axes. The refractive indices are all greater than 1.78. It displays weak pleochroism and strong bireflectance and absorption. In polished sections, Edoylerite is weakly bireflectant and weakly pleochroic with light gray colors. In plane-polarized light, edoylorite is bluish-gray to gray with brilliant pale yellow internal reflections. The pleochroism changes color in the direction it is viewed. In the x-direction, the color is a lemon-yellow, the y-direction exhibits a lemon-yellow color and in the z-direction, the color is a darker lemon-yellow.

== Chemical properties ==
In cold mineral acids, edoylerite is insoluble or only slightly soluble, but in aqua regia it dissolves slowly. After 24 hours in aqua regia at a constant temperature of 115 °C under infrared radiation, the mineral turns greenish yellow. At higher temperatures in the same conditions, the mineral loses its mercury (Hg) and sulfur (S) atoms resulting in a change of color to yellowish-black. Upon cooling, it changes from yellowish black to a dark green. The green residue from this experiment gives the X-ray powder diffraction pattern of Cr_{2}O_{3} (the synthetic equivalent of eskolaite. Edoylerite is photosensitive and will turn an olive-green after several months of exposure to visible light.

== Chemical composition ==
The empirical chemical formula for edoylerite is Hg_{3.26}^{2+}Cr_{0.97}^{6+}O_{4}S_{2.16}. Simplified, the formula is Hg_{3}^{2+}Cr^{6+}O_{4}S_{2} Wattersite, Hg^{1+}_{4}Hg^{2+}Cr^{6+}O_{6}, and deanesmithite, Hg^{1+}_{2}Hg^{2+}_{3}Cr^{6+}O_{5}S_{2}, are related species of edoylerite and are chemically similar, however their bonds . The difference between wattersite and edoylerite is the bonds. There are no Hg-S chains in the structure. The difference between deanesmithite and edoylerite is that three of the four Hg^{2+} are in distorted octahedral coordination. This equates to the unit cell dimension being similar but not exact.

Oxide	wt%
Hg	51.31
HgO	27.70
CrO_{3}	12.79
S	8.20
Total	100.00

== X-ray Powder Diffraction Data ==
Edoylerite is in the monoclinic crystal system, with space group P2_{1}/a. The unit cell dimensions are a=7.524(7) Å, b=14.819(8) Å, c=7.443(5) Å, α=90.00°, β=118.72(5)°, γ=90.00°.

d-spacing	Intensity	hkl
5.94 Å	40	011
4.88 Å	50	021
3.212 Å	100	2̅02
3.012 Å	60	131
2.307 Å	40	-
2.208 Å	35	-
2.185 Å	40	-

== See also ==
- List of minerals
