= Clearcreekite =

Rare mercury(I) basic carbonate mineral

General
- Category: Carbonate mineral
- Formula: Hg^{(1+)}_{3}CO_{3}(OH)∙2H_{2}O
- IMA symbol: Cck
- Strunz classification: 5.DC.30
- Crystal system: Monoclinic
- Crystal class: Prismatic (2/m) (same H-M symbol)
- Space group: P2_{1}/c

Identification
- Color: pale greenish yellow
- Crystal habit: tabular, subhedral
- Cleavage: good on {001}
- Fracture: uneven
- Tenacity: brittle
- Mohs scale hardness: probably 2
- Luster: vitreous
- Streak: pale greenish yellow
- Density: 6.96 g/cm^{3} (calculated)
- Optical properties: biaxial
- Refractive index: n = [2.06–2.12]

Clearcreekite is a carbonate mineral, polymorphous with peterbaylissite. The chemical formula of clearcreekite is Hg^{(1+)}_{3}CO_{3}(OH)∙2H_{2}O. It has a pale greenish yellow color and streak with tabular subhedral crystals and good cleavage on {001}. It is transparent with vitreous luster and uneven fracture. Its density (calculated from the idealized formula) is 6.96 g/cm^{3}. The mineral is monoclinic with the space group P2/c. Clearcreekite is an extremely rare mineral from the Clear Creek mercury mine, New Idria district, San Benito County, California. It was probably formed after the alteration of other mercury minerals such as cinnabar. The mineral is named after the locality where it was found.

== History ==
In 1959, Mr. Edward H. Oyler found a strange-looking mineral in the Clear Creek mercury mine. More than 30 years passed until edoylerite, named on his honor, was properly described by Erd et al.(1993). For more than 20 years Mr. Oyler collected minerals from the same location; deanesmithite, edgarbaileyrite, hanawaltite, peterbaylissite, szymanskiite, wattersite, and clearcreekite are among the new and unique minerals first collected by Mr. Oyler. Some of the minerals share physical characteristics like color and habit but their crystal structure is completely different, as shown by X-ray powder diffraction data. Clearcreekite is an extremely rare hydrous mercury carbonate mineral.

== Composition ==
The chemical formula of clearcreekite is Hg^{(1+)}_{3}CO_{3}(OH)∙2H_{2}O. It is a polymorph of peterbaylissite. The article about peterbaylissite written by Roberts et al. (1995) describe this mineral as orthorhombic with the point group 2/m, 2/m, 2/m, meanwhile clearcreekite is monoclinic; 2/m. The chemical composition of clearcreekite was obtained after analyzing one of the crystals: Hg_{2}O= 84.65%, CO_{2}= 6.16%, H_{2}O= 6.3%. The results given by the electron microprobe differ slightly from the percentages calculated using the idealized formula: H_{2}O= 87.54%, CO_{2}= 6.16%, H_{2}O= 6.3%. The only elements observed in the study were mercury, carbon, and oxygen.

== Structure ==
The structures of clearcreekite and peterbaylissite are very different but they still are chemically identical. One unique property about them is that the mercury ion does not occur as the mercury(I) ion Hg_{2}^{2+}, but as an Hg^{1+} ion in an oxysalt. Clearcreekite and peterbaylissite are classified as pure carbonate-bearing minerals with H_{2}O and OH. The carbonates consist of one central carbon atom surrounded by three oxygen atoms and the molecule easily adheres to hydrogen. The structure of clearcreekite presents hydrogen bonding between the carbonate and the hydroxyl. The unit cell parameters are: a 6.760(4), b 9.580(4), c 10.931(4) Ǻ (angstroms), β 105.53(5)º, V 682.1(6) Ǻ^{3}(cubic angstroms), a:b:c= 0.7056:1:1.1410. The X-ray powder diffraction pattern is very distinctive and unlike any other mineral.

== Physical properties ==
Only two crystals of clearcreekite have ever been found. The longest of them is only 0.17mm and they exhibit tabular, subhedral habit. Clearcreekite is transparent with a pale greenish yellow color and streak, vitreous luster, good cleavage on {001} and it is brittle with uneven fracture. Since the crystals are too small to perform accurate measurements, the hardness of clearcreekite is estimated to be about 2 (because the crystals are highly sensitive to an electron beam) and its density (calculated from the ideal formula) is 6.96 g/cm^{3}.

== Geologic occurrence ==
Mercury deposits in California are located mainly along the San Andreas Fault. The deposits are related to the transition of the North American Plate and the Pacific Plate boundary from converging to transform. The serpentinite from the (previously) overriding plate was replaced by silica-carbonate deposits (including cinnabar and mercury) due to the action of hydrothermal fluids. The sequence of mineral formations given by Dunning et al. (2005) show that the rare mercury minerals, including clearcreekite, are very late precipitates in the sequence. The crystals of clearcreekite were originally found on a silica-carbonate rock near specimens of cinnabar and edoylerite.

== Special characteristics ==
Clearcreekite is an extremely rare mineral found only at the Clear Creek mercury mine, New Idria district, San Benito County, California (longitude: 120°43′58″W and latitude 36°22′59″N). The mineral was named after the locality where it was found. The mine has produced about 29 mercury minerals, most of them unique to this area. In 1853, cinnabar was discovered in the region and extensive mining was conducted at the New Idria district. Today the district and the Clear Creek mine are abandoned.
