= Mercury oxide =

Mercury oxide can refer to:

- Mercury(I) oxide (mercurous oxide), Hg_{2}O
- Mercury(II) oxide (mercuric oxide), HgO

== See also ==
- Mercury battery, a battery that contains mercury(II) oxide
- Montroydite, the mineral form of mercury(II) oxide
