= Mercury(I) sulfide =

Hypothetical or unstable chemical compound

Mercury(I) sulfide or mercurous sulfide is a hypothetical chemical compound of mercury and sulfur, with chemical formula Hg_{2}S. Its existence has been disputed; it may be stable below 0 °C or in suitable environments, but is unstable at room temperature, decomposing into metallic mercury and mercury(II) sulfide (mercuric sulfide, cinnabar).

== History ==
This compound was described in the 19th century by Berzelius as a black precipitate obtained by passing hydrogen sulfide H_{2}S through solutions of mercury(I) salts.

As of 1825, the London Pharmacopoeia listed a compound called "Ethiops-mineral" or Hydrargyri Sulphuretum Nigrum ("black sulfide of mercury"), a black powder that was obtained by combining solid sulfur and mercury at room temperature. This preparation did not leave the characteristic stain of metallic mercury when rubbed onto gold. When a large amount of Ethiops-mineral was vigorously ground, however, it formed mercury and cinnabar with evolution of smoke and heat.

However, the existence of mercurous sulfide was disputed in 1816 by French pharmacist N. Guibourt. In his thesis he claimed that the precipitate obtained in such a manner was nothing more than an intimate mixture of mercury(II) sulfide HgS (mercuric sulfide, cinnabar) and metallic mercury Hg_{2}, which could be separated by heating or grinding. (Guibourt also denied the reality of mercurous oxide Hg_{2}O, for the same reason.)

Reviewing Guibourt's article in 1825, British chemist W. T. Brande disputed his conclusions. He observed that the proportions of mercury and sulfur in the precipitate are stoichiometric for the formula Hg_{2}S; and that nitrogen triiodide, silver fulminate, and mercury fulminate were accepted compounds, even though they were decomposed by slight friction. He claimed that the black precipitate did not show any sign of metallic mercury or cinnabar (although it was easily decomposed into them). He also noted that hot nitric acid does not attack cinnabar, whereas it quickly turns precipitated "mercurous sulfide" to mercuric nitrate without leaving any residue.

In 1894, Italian chemists Antony and Sestini claimed to have determined that mercurous sulfide was stable at –10 °C, but disproportionated into Hg_{2} and HgS when heated to 0 °C.

== Chemical properties ==
According to W. T. Brande, mercurous sulfide is easily decomposed by trituration, exposure to sunlight, or heating to 300 °F (149 °C). It reacts with hot nitric acid yielding mercuric nitrate. Boiling with potassium carbonate ("potassa", potash) removes part of the sulfur leaving pure cinnabar as residue.

== Structure ==
The structural formula is supposed to contain two mercury atoms bound to each other, as in the real compound mercury(I) chloride (calomel), Hg_{2}Cl_{2}. The latter is an ionic compound with the dimercury(I) cation, Hg_{2}^{2+} or ^{+}Hg-Hg^{+}, and chloride anions Cl^{−}.

However, like cinnabar, Hg_{2}S may be a covalent polymer [–S–Hg–Hg–]_{n} rather than an ionic compound. Many stable polymeric mercury compounds with the bonding system E-Hg-Hg-E (E = N, P, As, Sb, O, S, Se, and Sn) have been described since 1958.

One may also note that the stable compound Hg_{4}BiS_{2}Cl_{5}, recently synthesized, was found to consist of two-dimensional polymeric cations [–(S–)–Hg–Hg–(S–Hg–)–Hg–]_{n}^{2n+} balanced by one-dimensional polymeric anions [–Cl–(BiCl_{4})–]_{n}^{2n–}. In the cations, the sulfur atoms are tricoordinated, and the mercury atoms are dicoordinated. In each unit, two of the mercury atoms form S–Hg–S bridges, while the other two form an S–Hg–Hg–S bridge.

== Preparation ==
=== New insight ===
New insights that might lead to the successful synthesis of Hg_{2}S has been coming since 1958 through the work of Klaus Brodersen and others. The reaction between dimercury(I) salts and Lewis bases in polar solvents normally destroys the Hg–Hg bond. The successful preparation of S–Hg–Hg–S compounds can be achieved with nonpolar solvents, weak Lewis bases, and NH acidic nitrogen compounds.

=== Older claims ===
In the 19th and early 20th centuries, several preparation routes for Hg_{2}S have been described, but their reliability is questionable. According to W. T. Brande (1825), mercurous sulfide can be reliably obtained by passing H_{2}S through a very dilute solution of mercurous chloride (calomel) or nitrate, and carefully filtering the black precipitate.

According to 19th-century pharmacopoeia, the preparation Ethiops-mineral, claimed to be mercurous sulfide, was prepared by gentle grinding of equal parts of mercury and sulfur, until the mercury globules were no longer visible.

According to Scherer, Hg_{2}S could be obtained by reaction of mercurous nitrate HgNO_{3} and sodium thiosulfate Na_{2}S_{2}O_{3}. However, a review of the procedure by J. T. Norton in 1900 cast doubts on the claim.

A report from 1903 by American chemist Charles Baskerville claims that sulfuric acid left over metallic mercury in a closed bottle for over 5 years developed a crust over the metal that was found to be mercurous sulfide.
