= Mercury sulfide =

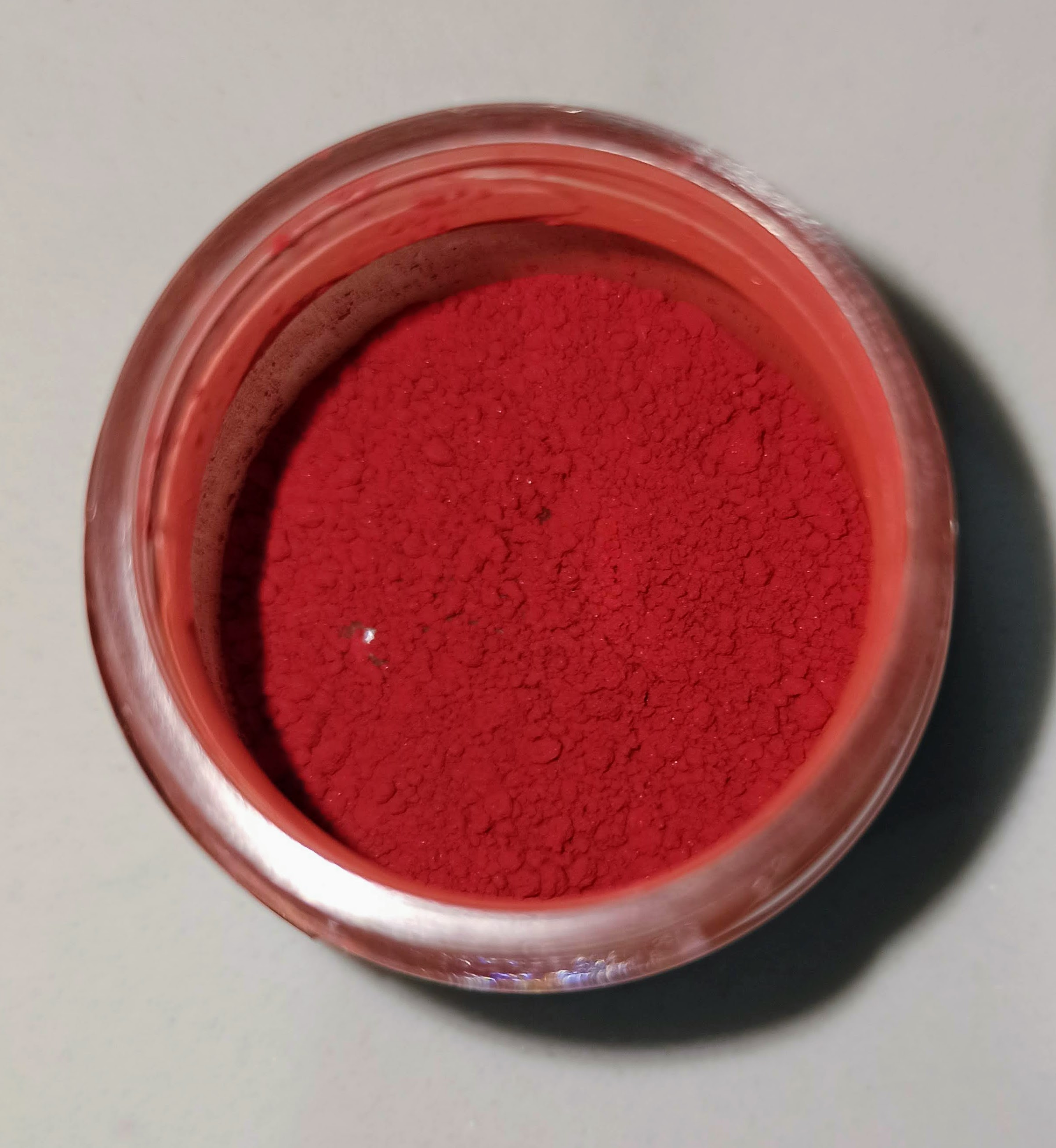

Names
- IUPAC name Mercury sulfide
- Other names: Cinnabar; Vermilion

Identifiers
CAS Number	1344-48-5
3D model (JSmol)	Interactive image
ChemSpider	8395759
ECHA InfoCard	100.014.270
EC Number	215-696-3
PubChem CID	62402
UNII	ZI0T668SF1
UN number	2025
CompTox Dashboard (EPA)	DTXSID301318265 DTXSID0047747, DTXSID301318265
- InChI: InChI=1S/Hg.S Key: QXKXDIKCIPXUPL-UHFFFAOYSA-N
- SMILES: [S]=[Hg]

Properties
Chemical formula	HgS
Molar mass	232.65 g·mol^{−1}
Density	α-HgS: 8.17 g/cm^{3}; β-HgS: 7.70 g/cm^{3}
Melting point	α-HgS: 344 °C (651 °F; 617 K), transforms to β-HgS; β-HgS: 820 °C (1,510 °F; 1,090 K)
Solubility in water	insoluble
Solubility in ethanol	soluble (β-HgS)
Band gap	2.1 eV (direct, α-HgS)
Magnetic susceptibility (χ)	−55.4×10^{−6} cm^{3}/mol (α-HgS)
Refractive index (n_{D})	2.9003 (α-HgS)

Thermochemistry
Heat capacity (C)	48.4 J⋅mol^{−1}·K^{-1}
Std molar entropy (S^{⦵}_{298})	82.4 J⋅mol^{−1}·K^{-1}
Std enthalpy of formation (Δ_{f}H^{⦵}_{298})	−58.2 kJ⋅mol^{−1}
Gibbs free energy (Δ_{f}G^{⦵})	−50.5 kJ⋅mol^{−1}

Hazards
- GHS labelling
Pictograms	(GHS06: Toxic) (GHS07: Exclamation mark) (GHS08: Health hazard) (GHS09: Environmental hazard)
Signal word	Danger
Hazard statements	H300, H310, H317, H330, H373, H410
Precautionary statements	P261, P272, P280, P302+P352, P321, P333+P313, P363, P501
NFPA 704 (fire diamond)	4 0 0
Safety data sheet (SDS)	Fisher Scientific

Related compounds
Other anions	Mercury oxide; Mercury selenide; Mercury telluride
Other cations	Zinc sulfide; Cadmium sulfide
- Except where otherwise noted, data are given for materials in their standard state (at 25 °C [77 °F], 100 kPa). verify (what is ?) Infobox references

Mercury sulfide or mercury(II) sulfide is a chemical compound composed of the chemical elements mercury and sulfur. It is represented by the chemical formula HgS. It is virtually insoluble in water.

== Crystal structure ==
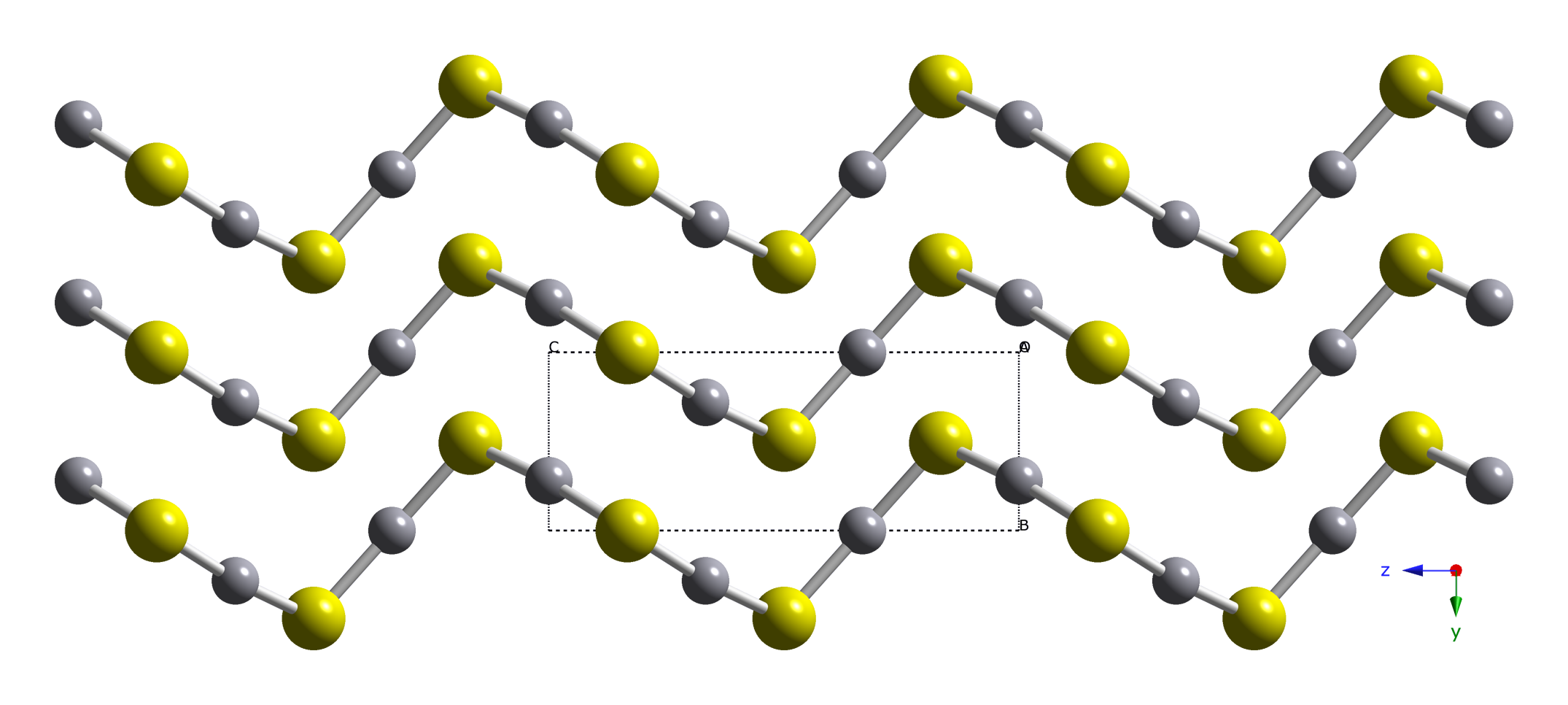
Structure of a-HgS looking at the a-axis

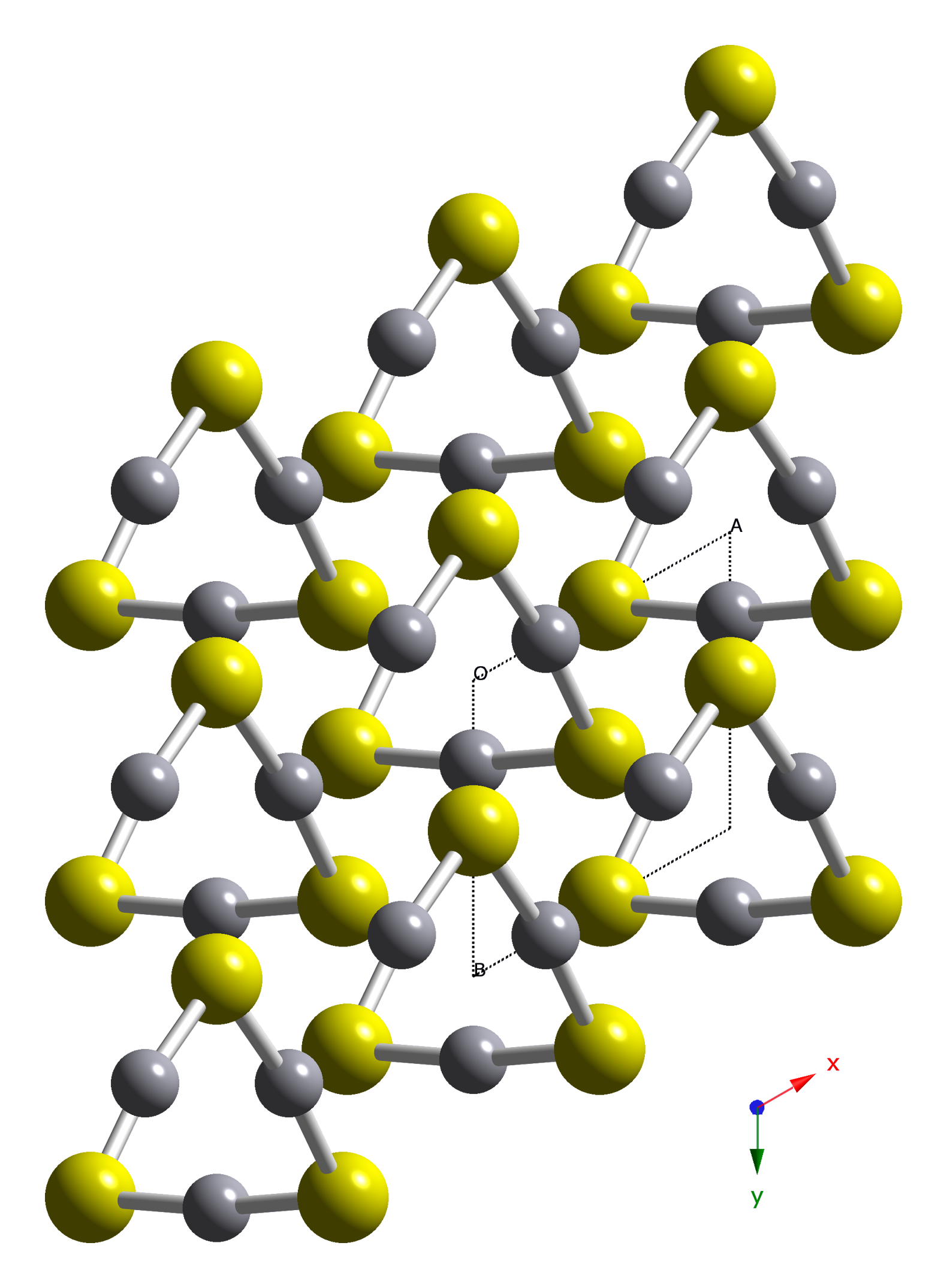
Structure of a-HgS looking at the c-axis

HgS is trimorphic, having three crystal forms:

- Red cinnabar (α-HgS) is the form in which mercury is most commonly found in nature. Cinnabar has a rhombohedral crystal system. Crystals of α-HgS are optically active. This is caused by helices in the structure.
- Black metacinnabar (β-HgS) is less common in nature and adopts the zinc blende crystal structure (T^{2}_{d}-F4̅3m).
- The higher temperature hypercinnabar (hexagonal structure).

== Preparation and chemistry ==
β-HgS precipitates as a black solid when Hg(II) salts are treated with H_{2}S. The reaction is conveniently conducted with an acetic acid solution of mercury(II) acetate. With gentle heating of the slurry, the black polymorph converts to the red form. β-HgS is unreactive to all but concentrated acids.

Mercury is produced from the cinnabar ore by roasting in air and condensing the vapour.

HgS → Hg + S

== Uses ==
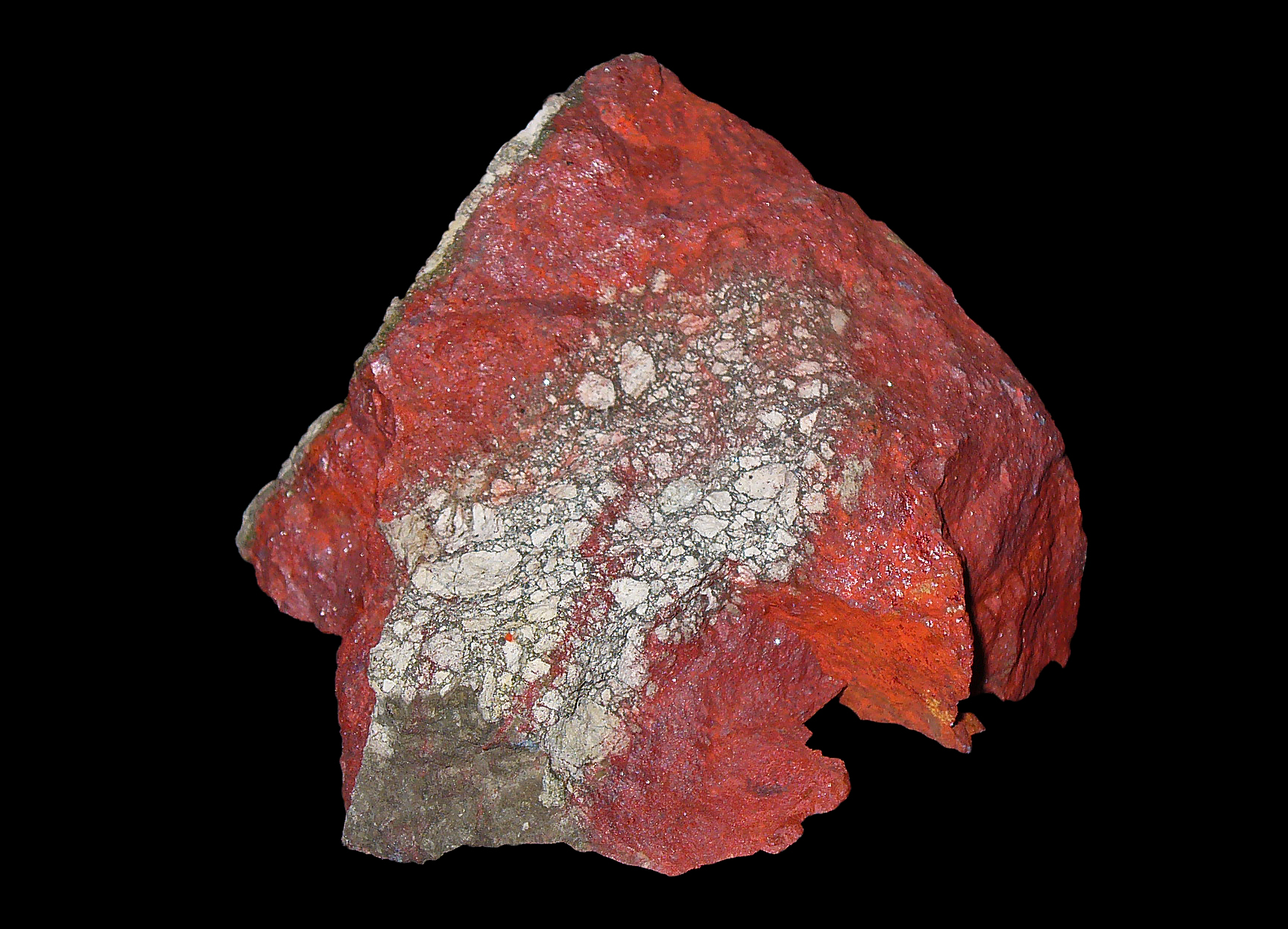
Cinnabar (red portion of specimen)

When α-HgS is used as a red pigment, it is known as cinnabar. The tendency of cinnabar to darken has been ascribed to conversion from red α-HgS to black β-HgS. However β-HgS was not detected at excavations in Pompeii, where originally red walls darkened, and was attributed to the formation of Hg-Cl compounds (e.g., corderoite, calomel, and terlinguaite) and calcium sulfate, gypsum.

As the mercury cell as used in the chlor-alkali industry (Castner–Kellner process) is being phased out over concerns over mercury emissions, the metallic mercury from these setups is converted into mercury sulfide for underground storage.

It has been studied for use in photoelectrochemical cells.

== See also ==
- Mercury poisoning
- Mercury(I) sulfide (mercurous sulfide, Hg_{2}S), hypothetical
