= Calomel =

Mercury chloride mineral

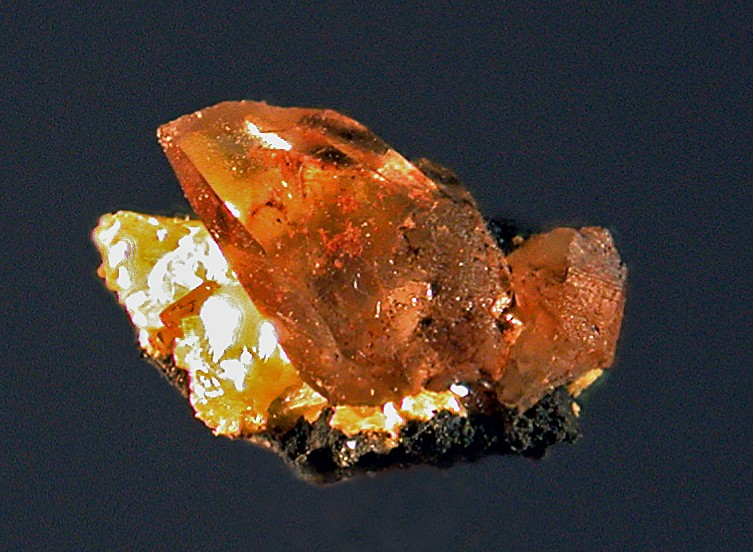
- Amber calomel crystals and bright yellow terlinguaite on gossan matrix, 3 mm. across

General
- Category: Halide mineral
- Formula: (Hg_{2})^{2+}Cl_{2}
- IMA symbol: Clo
- Strunz classification: 3.AA.30
- Crystal system: Tetragonal
- Crystal class: Ditetragonal dipyramidal 4/mmm (4/m 2/m 2/m) -
- Unit cell: a = 4.4795(5) Å, c = 10.9054(9) Å; Z=4

Identification
- Color: Colorless, white, grayish, yellowish white, yellowish grey to ash-grey, brown
- Crystal habit: Crystals commonly tabular to prismatic, equant pyramidal; common as drusy crusts, earthy, massive.
- Twinning: Contact and penetration twins on {112}
- Cleavage: Good on {110}, uneven to imperfect on {011}
- Fracture: Conchoidal
- Tenacity: Sectile
- Mohs scale hardness: 1.5
- Luster: Adamantine
- Diaphaneity: Transparent to translucent
- Specific gravity: 7.5
- Optical properties: Uniaxial (+); very high relief
- Refractive index: n_{ω} = 1.973 n_{ε} = 2.656
- Birefringence: δ = 0.683
- Pleochroism: Weak, E > O
- Ultraviolet fluorescence: Brick-red under UV

Calomel is a mercury chloride mineral with formula Hg_{2}Cl_{2} (see mercury(I) chloride). It was used as a medicine from the 16th to early 20th century, despite frequently causing mercury poisoning in patients.

The name derives from Greek kalos (beautiful) and melas (black) because it turns black on reaction with ammonia. This was known to alchemists.

Calomel occurs as a secondary mineral which forms as an alteration product in mercury deposits. It occurs with native mercury, amalgam, cinnabar, mercurian tetrahedrite, eglestonite, terlinguaite, montroydite, kleinite, moschelite, kadyrelite, kuzminite, chursinite, kelyanite, calcite, limonite and various clay minerals.

The type locality is Moschellandsburg, Alsenz-Obermoschel, Rhineland-Palatinate, Germany.

== History ==
The substance later known as calomel was first documented in ancient Persia by medical historian Rhazes in year 850. Only a few of the compounds he mentioned could be positively identified as calomel, as not every alchemist disclosed what compounds they used in their drugs. Calomel first entered Western medical literature in 1608, when Oswald Croll wrote about its preparation in his Tyroncium Chemicum. It was not called calomel until 1655, when the name was created by Théodore de Mayerne, who had published its preparation and formula in "Pharmacopoeia Londinensis" in 1618.

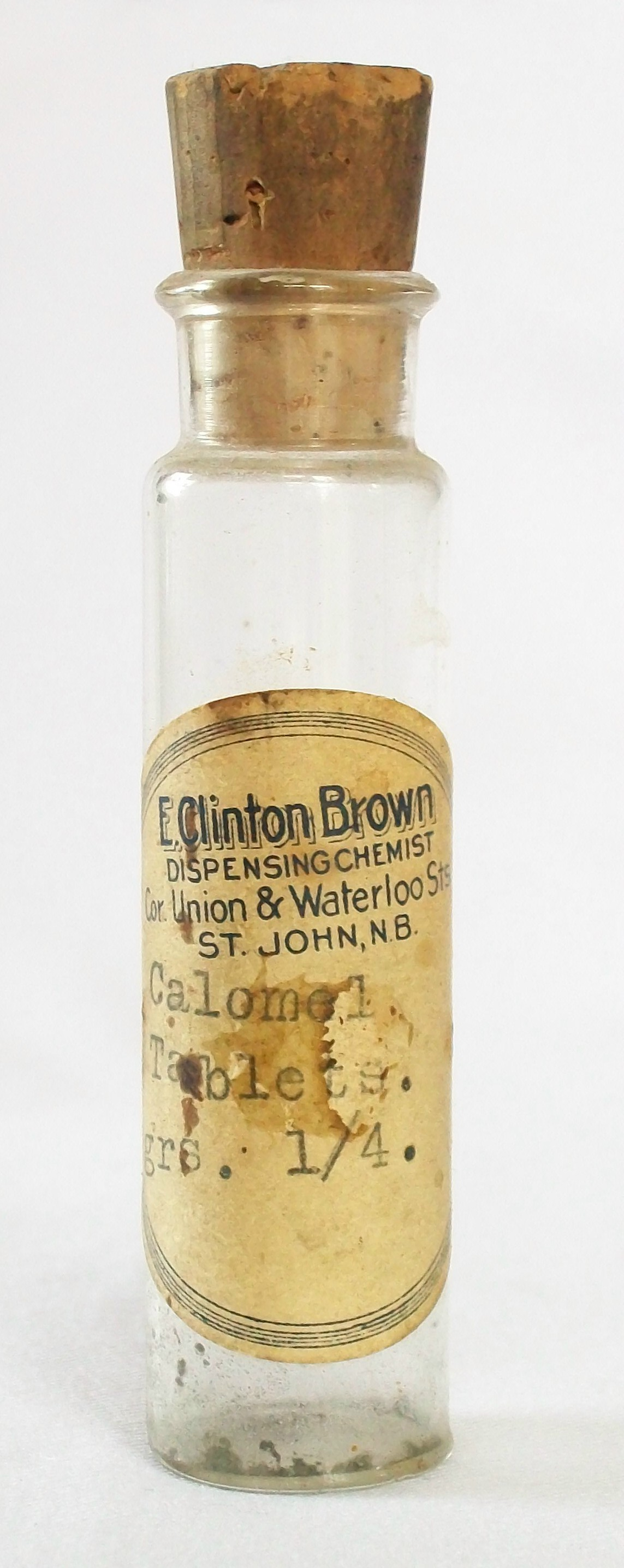
Calomel was a common medicine from the 16th to 20th century, despite causing mercury poisoning.

By the 19th century, calomel was viewed as a panacea, or miracle drug, and was used against almost every disease, including syphilis, bronchitis, cholera, ingrown toenails, teething, gout, tuberculosis, influenza, and cancer. During the 18th and early 19th centuries pharmacists used it sparingly; but by the late 1840s, it was being prescribed in heroic doses—due in part to the research of Benjamin Rush, who coined the term "heroic dose" to mean about 20 grains (1.3 g) taken four times daily. This stance was supported by Samuel Cartwright, who believed that large doses were "gentlest" on the body. As calomel rose in popularity, more research was done into how it worked.

J. Annesley was one of the first to write about the differing effects of calomel when taken in small or large doses. Through experimentation on dogs, Annesley concluded that calomel acted more like a laxative on the whole body rather than acting specifically on the vascular system or liver as previous physicians believed. In 1853, Samuel Jackson described the harmful effects of calomel on children in his publication for Transactions of Physicians of Philadelphia. He noted that calomel had harmful effects causing gangrene on the skin, loss of teeth, and deterioration of the gums. On May 4, 1863, William A. Hammond, the United States' surgeon-general, stated that calomel would no longer be used in the army as it was being abused by soldiers and physicians alike. This caused much debate in the medical field, and eventually led to his removal as surgeon-general. Calomel continued to be used well into the 1890s and even into the early 20th century. Eventually calomel's popularity began to wane as more research was done, and scientists discovered that the mercury in the compound was poisoning patients.

Calomel was the main of the three components of the pill number 9 of the British army during the First World War.

== Electrochemistry ==
Calomel is used as the interface between metallic mercury and a chloride solution in a saturated calomel electrode, which is used in electrochemistry to measure pH and electrical potentials in solutions. In most electrochemical measurements, it is necessary to keep one of the electrodes in an electrochemical cell at a constant potential. This so-called reference electrode allows control of the potential of a working electrode.

== Chemical properties ==
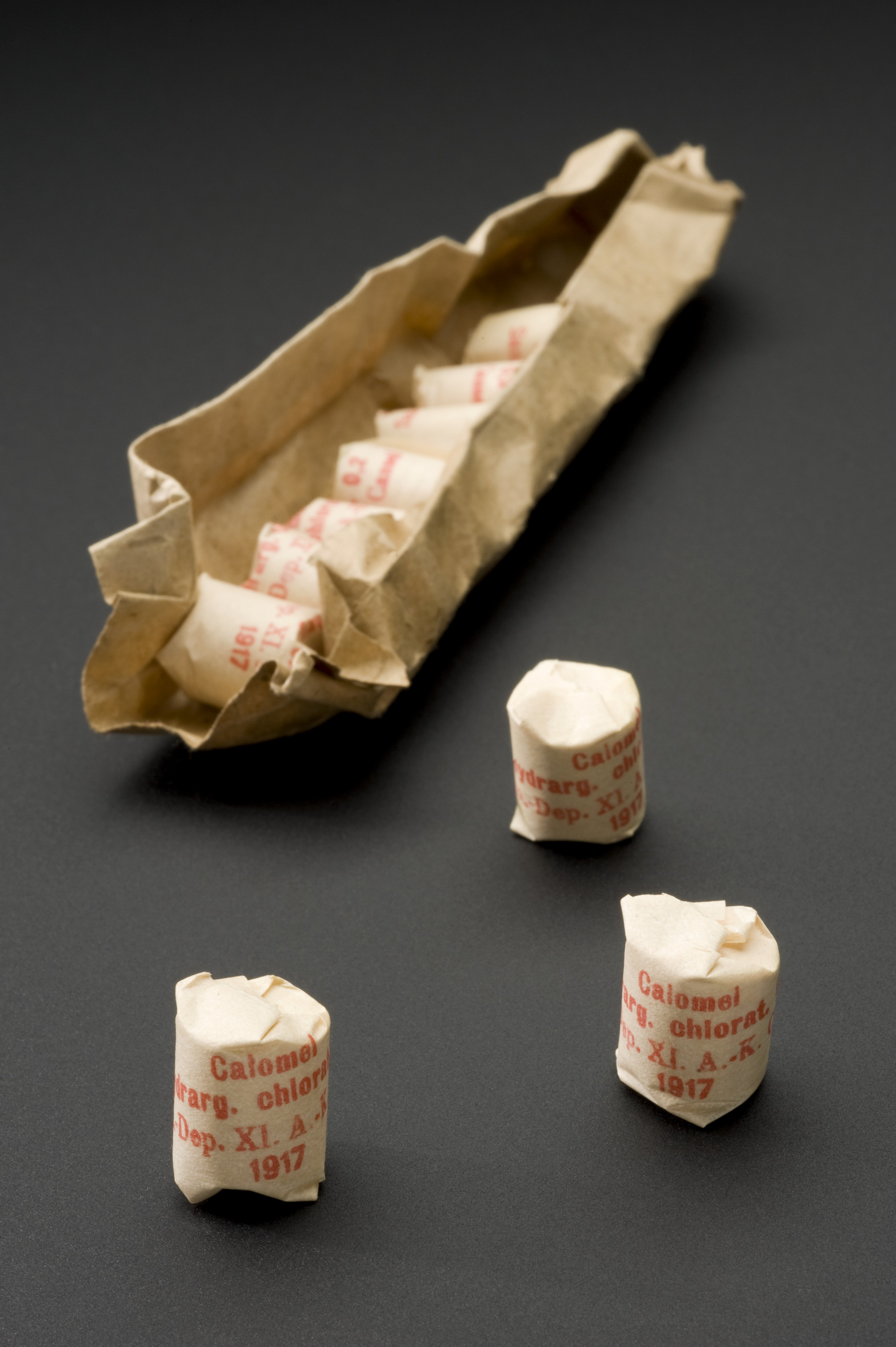
Packets of calomel.

Calomel is a powder that is white when pure, and it has been used as a pigment in painting in 17th century South Americas art and in European medieval manuscripts. When it is exposed to light or contains impurities it takes on a darker tint. Calomel is made up of mercury and chlorine with the chemical formula Hg_{2}Cl_{2}. Depending on how calomel was administered, it affected the body in different ways. Taken orally, calomel damaged mainly the lining of the gastrointestinal tract. Mercury salts (such as calomel) are insoluble in water and therefore do not absorb well through the wall of the small intestine. Some of the calomel in the digestive system will likely be oxidized into a form of mercury that can be absorbed through the intestine, but most of it will not. Oral calomel was actually the safest form of the drug to take, especially in low doses. Most of the calomel ingested will be excreted through urine and stool.

Powdered forms of calomel were much more toxic, as their vapors damaged the brain. Once inhaled, the calomel enters the bloodstream and the mercury binds with the amino acids methionine, cysteine, homocysteine and taurine. This is because of the sulfur group these amino acids contain, which mercury has a high affinity for. It is able to pass through the blood–brain barrier and builds up in the brain. Mercury also has the ability to pass through the placenta, causing damage to unborn babies if a pregnant mother is taking calomel.

Calomel was manufactured in two ways - sublimation and precipitation. When calomel first started being manufactured it was done through sublimation. Calomel made through sublimation tends to be a very fine white powder. There was some controversy over the sublimation of calomel. Many argued that the more times calomel was sublimed, the purer it got. Opponents believed that the repeated sublimation made calomel lose some of its therapeutic ability. In 1788 chemist Carl Wilhelm Scheele came up with the mechanism to make precipitated calomel. This became rapidly popular in the pharmaceutical industry because it was both a cheaper and safer form of production. Precipitation also tended to form very pure calomel salts.

== Medicine ==
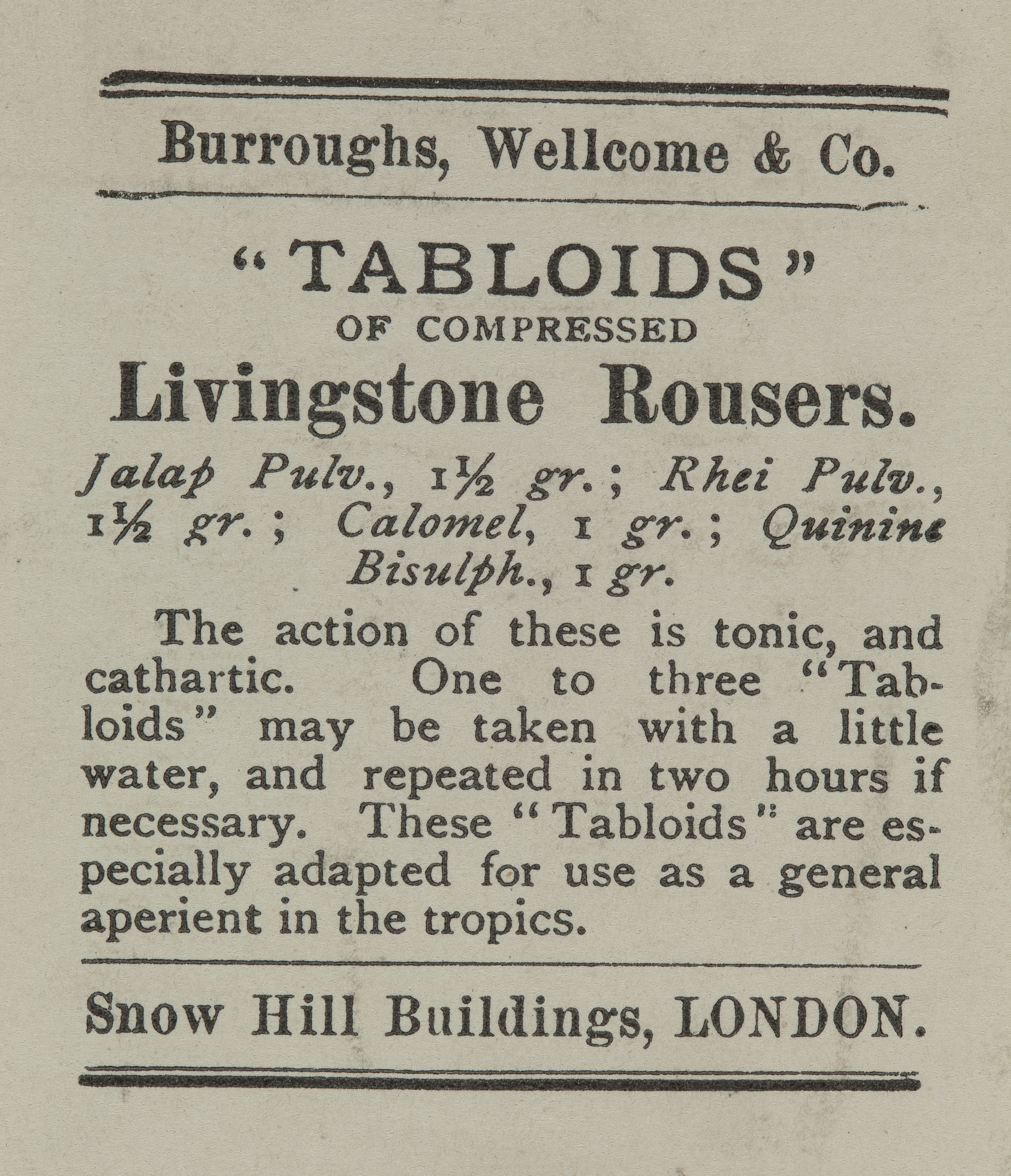
An advertisement from 1896 for a medicine containing calomel.

Calomel was a popular medicine used during the Victorian period, and was widely used as a treatment for a variety of ailments during the American Civil War. The medication was available in two forms, blue pills and blue masses. The blue pill was an oral form of calomel containing mercury that was often mixed with a sweet substance, like licorice or sugar in order to be taken by mouth. The blue mass was a solid form of calomel in which a piece could be pinched off and administered by any one of several possible routes (e.g. orally, skin absorption, vapor inhalation) by a physician or other medical provider. Neither form of the medication came with a standardization of dosing. There was no way of knowing how much mercurous chloride each dose contained.

=== Uses ===
Calomel was marketed as a purgative agent to relieve congestion and constipation; however, physicians at the time had no idea what the medication's mechanism of action was. They learned how calomel worked through trial and error. It was observed that small doses of calomel acted as a stimulant, often leading to bowel movements, while larger doses caused sedation. During the 19th century, calomel was used to treat numerous illnesses and diseases like mumps, typhoid fever, and others—especially those that impact the gastrointestinal tract, such as constipation, dysentery, and vomiting. As mercury softened the gums, calomel was the principal constituent of teething powders until the mid-twentieth century. Babies given calomel for teething often suffered from acrodynia.

=== Side effects ===
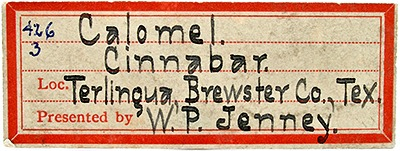
Label from a calomel and cinnabar specimen

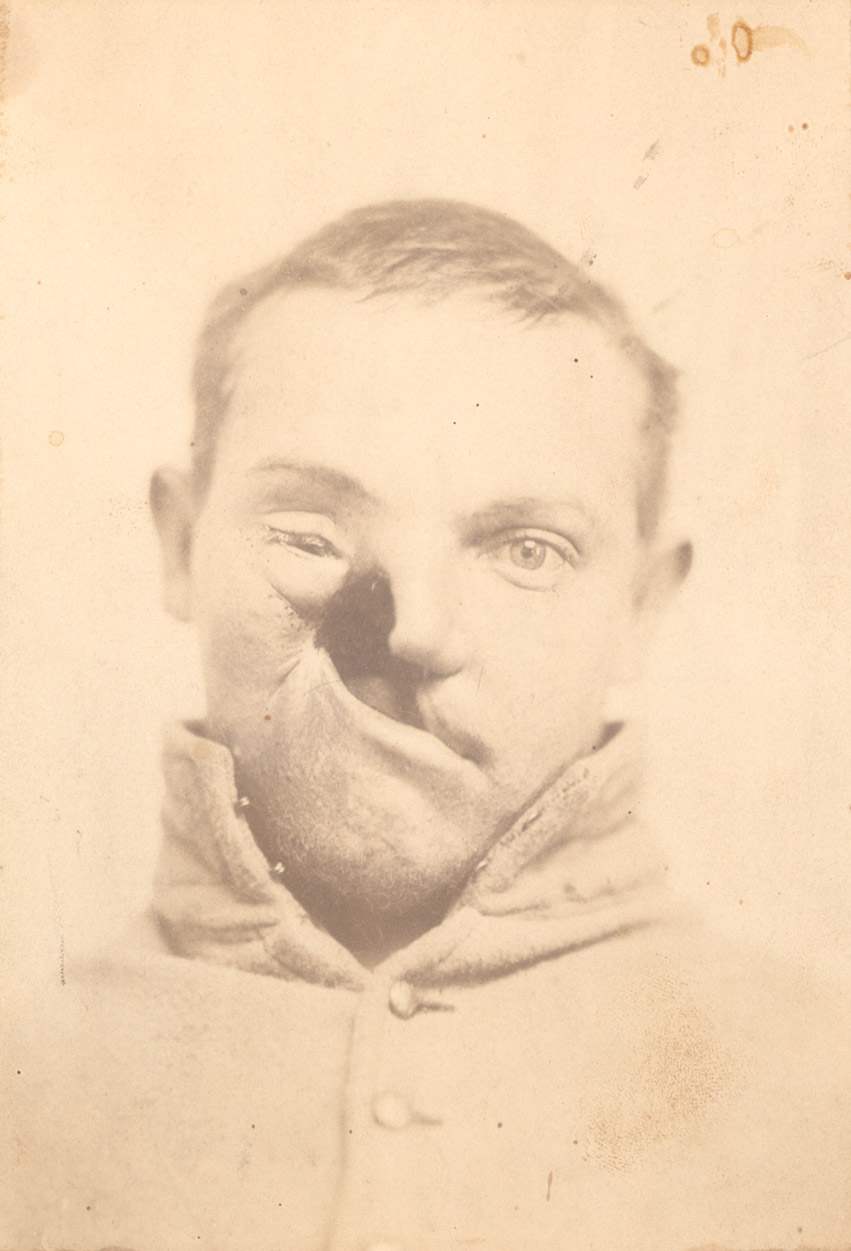
Disfigurement caused by calomel administered to treat pneumonia (1862). The calomel treatment caused an ulcer to form and spread across the patient's tongue, mouth, cheek, and eye; ultimately killing his upper maxilla.

It became popular in the late 18th century to give calomel in extremely high doses, as Benjamin Rush normalized the heroic dose. This caused many patients to experience many painful and sometimes life-threatening side effects.

Calomel, in high doses, led to mercury poisoning, which had the potential to cause permanent deformities and even death. Some patients experienced gangrene of the mouth generated by the mercury in the medicine, which caused the tissue on the cheeks and gums inside the mouth to break down and die. Some patients would lose teeth, while others were left with facial deformities.

High doses of calomel would often lead to extreme cramping, vomiting, and bloody diarrhea; however, at the time, this was taken as a sign that the calomel was working to purge the system and rid the disease. Calomel was often administered as a treatment for dysentery; the effects of calomel would often worsen the severe diarrhea associated with dysentery and acted as a catalyst in speeding up the effects of dehydration.

One victim was Alvin Smith, the eldest brother of Joseph Smith, founder of the Church of Jesus Christ of Latter-day Saints. Alvin was suffering from a "bilious colic" better known as abdominal pain.

It was also used by Charles Darwin to treat his mysterious chronic gastrointestinal illness, which has recently been attributed to Crohn's disease.

=== Discontinuation ===
By the mid-19th century, some physicians had begun to question the usefulness of calomel. In 1863, the Surgeon General of the U.S. Army forbade calomel from inclusion in army medical supplies, a decision that angered many practicing doctors. The use of calomel gradually died out over the course of the late 19th and early 20th centuries, although its use persisted longer in the American South and American West.

== General bibliography ==
- Palache, P.; Berman H.; Frondel, C. (1960). Dana's System of Mineralogy, Volume II: Halides, Nitrates, Borates, Carbonates, Sulfates, Phosphates, Arsenates, Tungstates, Molybdates, Etc. (Seventh Edition). John Wiley and Sons, Inc., New York, pp. 25–28.
