= Mercury(II) oxide =

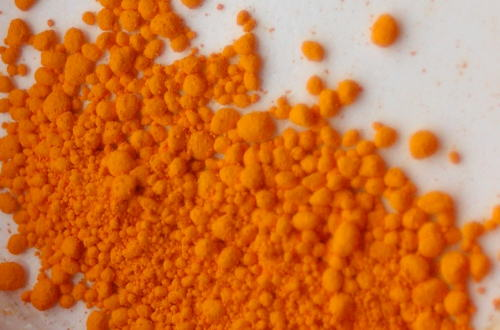
- Mercury(II) oxide

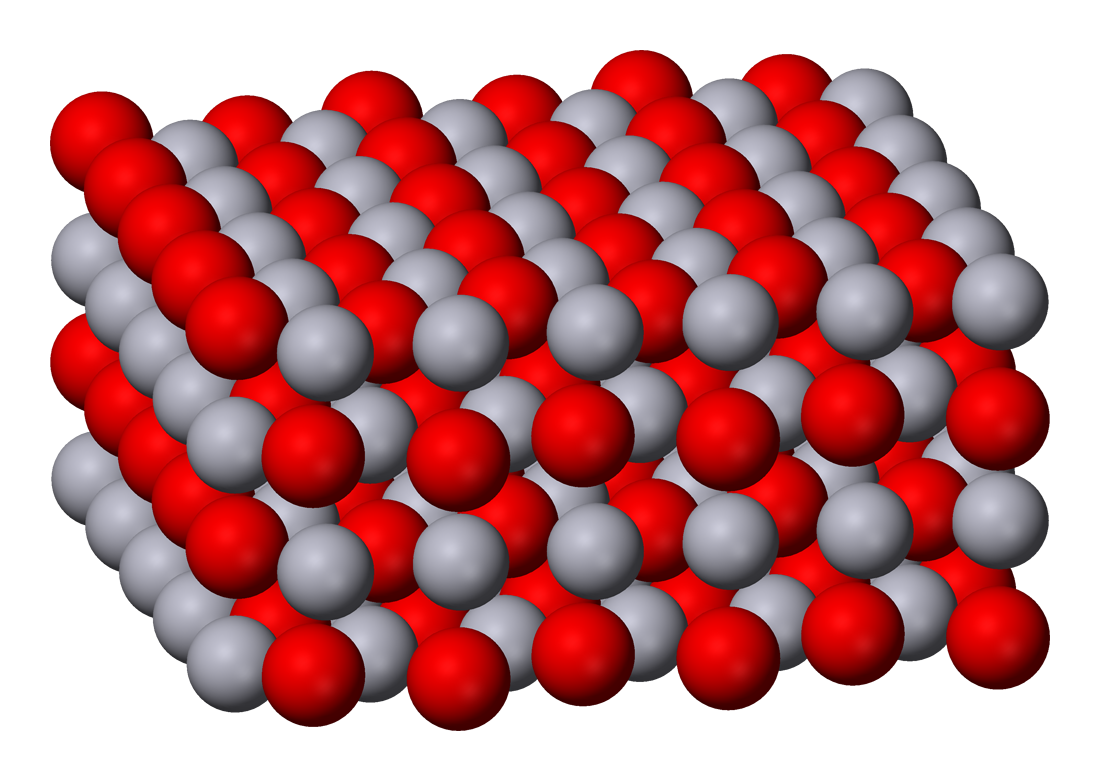
- Mercury(II) oxide

Names
- IUPAC name Mercury(II) oxide
- Other names Mercuric oxide Montroydite; Red mercury

Identifiers
CAS Number	21908-53-2
3D model (JSmol)	Interactive image
ChemSpider	28626
ECHA InfoCard	100.040.580
KEGG	C18670
PubChem CID	30856
RTECS number	OW8750000
UNII	IY191986AO
UN number	1641
CompTox Dashboard (EPA)	DTXSID4042125
- InChI: InChI=1S/Hg.O Key: UKWHYYKOEPRTIC-UHFFFAOYSA-N
- SMILES: [Hg]=O

Properties
Chemical formula	HgO
Molar mass	216.591 g·mol^{−1}
Appearance	Yellow or red solid
Odor	odorless
Density	11.14 g/cm^{3}
Melting point	500 °C (932 °F; 773 K) (decomposes)
Solubility in water	0.0053 g/100 mL (25 °C); 0.0395 g/100 mL (100 °C)
Solubility	insoluble in alcohol, ether, acetone, ammonia
Band gap	2.2 eV
Magnetic susceptibility (χ)	−44.0·10^{−6} cm^{3}/mol
Refractive index (n_{D})	2.5 (550 nm)

Thermochemistry
Std molar entropy (S^{⦵}_{298})	70 J·mol^{−1}·K^{−1}
Std enthalpy of formation (Δ_{f}H^{⦵}_{298})	−90 kJ·mol^{−1}

Hazards
- Occupational safety and health (OHS/OSH)
Main hazards	Extremely toxic, environmental pollutant
- GHS labelling
Pictograms	(GHS06: Toxic) (GHS08: Health hazard) (GHS09: Environmental hazard)
Signal word	Danger
Hazard statements	H300+H310+H330, H372, H410
Precautionary statements	P260, P262, P264, P270, P271, P273, P280, P284, P301+P316, P302+P352, P304+P340, P316, P320, P321, P330, P361+P364, P391, P403+P233, P405, P501
NFPA 704 (fire diamond)	4 0 1
Flash point	Non-flammable
- Lethal dose or concentration (LD, LC)
LD_{50} (median dose)	18 mg/kg (oral, rat)
Safety data sheet (SDS)	ICSC 0981

Related compounds
Other anions	Mercury sulfide Mercury selenide Mercury telluride
Other cations	Zinc oxide Cadmium oxide
Related compounds	Mercury(I) oxide
- Except where otherwise noted, data are given for materials in their standard state (at 25 °C [77 °F], 100 kPa). verify (what is ?) Infobox references

Mercury(II) oxide, also called mercuric oxide or simply mercury oxide, is the inorganic compound with the formula HgO. It has a red or orange color. Mercury(II) oxide is a solid at room temperature and pressure. The mineral form montroydite is very rarely found.

== History ==
An experiment for the preparation of mercuric oxide was first described by 11th century Arab-Spanish alchemist, Maslama al-Majriti, in Rutbat al-hakim. It was historically called red precipitate (as opposed to white precipitate, mercuric amidochloride).

In 1774, Joseph Priestley discovered that oxygen was released by heating mercuric oxide, although he did not identify the gas as oxygen (rather, Priestley called it "dephlogisticated air," as that was the paradigm that he was working under at the time).

== Synthesis and reactions ==
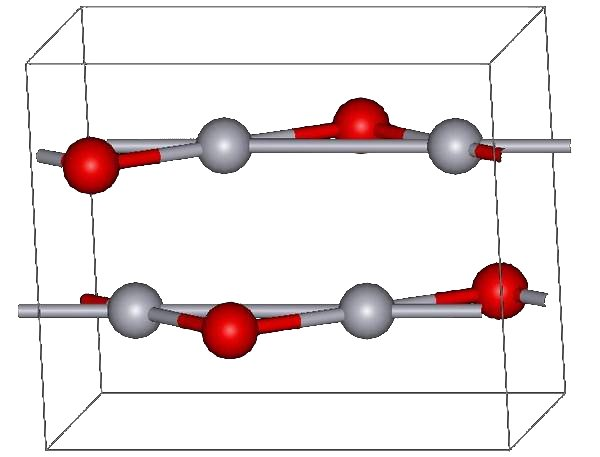
Montroydite structure (red atoms are oxygen)

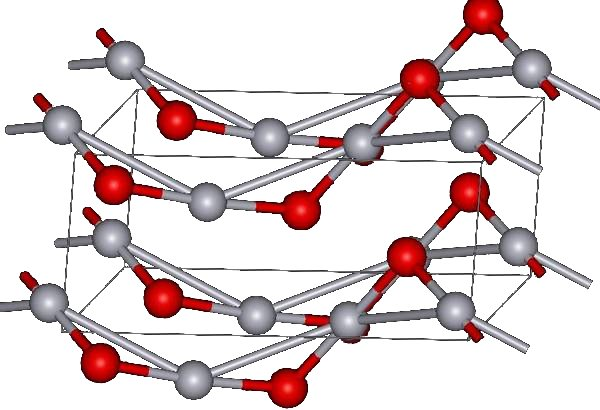
Cinnabar structure

The red form of HgO can be made by heating Hg in oxygen at roughly 350 °C, or by pyrolysis of Hg(NO_{3})_{2}. The yellow form can be obtained by precipitation of aqueous Hg^{2+} with alkali. The difference in color is due to particle size; both forms have the same structure consisting of near linear O-Hg-O units linked in zigzag chains with an Hg-O-Hg angle of 108°.

HgO is soluble in many conventional strong acids through protonation of the anion. The exceptions include acids which form insoluble mercury(II) salts, like mercury(II) iodide in the case of hydroiodic acid. Dissolution is also possible through complexation of the cation; e.g. cyanide ligands form stable water soluble mercury(II) complexes.

== Structure ==
Under atmospheric pressure mercuric oxide has two crystalline forms: one is called montroydite (orthorhombic, 2/m 2/m 2/m, Pnma), and the second is analogous to the sulfide mineral cinnabar (hexagonal, hP6, P3221); both are characterized by Hg-O chains. At pressures above 10 GPa both structures convert to a tetragonal form.

== Uses ==
Mercury oxide is sometimes used in the production of mercury as it decomposes quite easily. When it decomposes, oxygen gas is generated.

It is also used as a material for cathodes in mercury batteries.

== Health issues ==
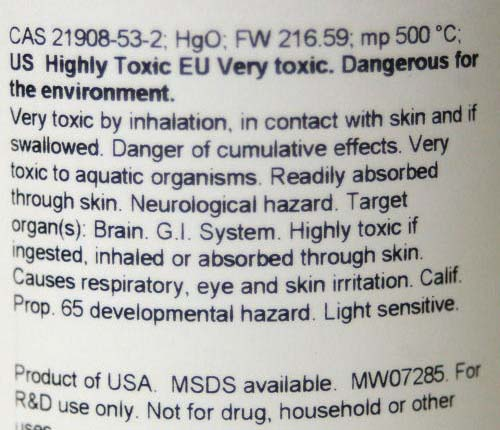
The label on an HgO powder bottle.

Mercury oxide is a highly toxic substance which can be absorbed into the body by inhalation of its aerosol, through the skin and by ingestion. The substance is irritating to the eyes, the skin and the respiratory tract and may have effects on the kidneys, resulting in kidney impairment. In the food chain important to humans, bioaccumulation takes place, specifically in aquatic organisms. The substance is banned as a pesticide in the EU.

Evaporation at 20 °C is negligible. HgO decomposes on exposure to light or on heating above 500 °C. Heating produces highly toxic mercury fumes and oxygen, which increases the fire hazard. Mercury(II) oxide reacts violently with reducing agents, chlorine, hydrogen peroxide, magnesium (when heated), disulfur dichloride and hydrogen trisulfide. Shock-sensitive compounds are formed with metals and elements such as sulfur and phosphorus.
