= Maya death rituals =

Part of Maya religion

Death rituals were an important part of Maya religion. The Maya greatly respected death; they were taught to fear it and grieved deeply for the deceased. They also believed that certain deaths were more noble than others.

== Background ==
The Maya were ritualistic people, who paid great respect to the destructive nature of their gods. They had many traditions to commemorate the recently deceased and worship long-departed ancestors.

People who died by suicide, sacrifice, complications of childbirth, perish in the ball game, and in battle were thought to be transported directly into heaven. The reason a violent death led to one souls being able to immediately enter the Maya heaven is because the gods are thankful for their sacrifice to them. People who were to eventually become sacrifices were paraded in litters by citizens before their death.

Before Spanish influence, there may not have been a common idea of the afterlife. The Yucatec Maya believed that there were different routes after death. A pot from a Pacal tomb depicts ancestors of Maya kings sprouting through the earth like fruit trees and together creating an orchard. The Maya had several forms of ancestor worship. They built idols containing ashes of the dead and brought them food on festival days. Alternatively, a temple could be built over an urn. In those that were sacrificed, the most common way was cutting the abdomen, and taking out the heart.

== Customs ==
The Maya dead were laid to rest with maize placed in their mouth. Maize, highly important in Maya culture, is a symbol of rebirth and also was food for the dead for the journey to the otherworld. Similarly, a jade or stone bead placed in the mouth served as currency for this journey. Due to its green color resembling that of corn stalks, burying the deceased with jade was believed to allow them to follow the path of the Maize God, eventually leading to their rebirth. The practice of wrapping royalty was meant to localize their remains to a finite space. Mortuary bundles would be overlapped with depictions of deity bundles and covered in cinnabar signified rebirth. Marine artifacts in a tomb were meant to create a sense that the body has been set within a cave or upon the underworld. Bloodletting artifacts can be found amongst the dead at the Caracol site. A corpse being buried with these artifacts was to praise God A’. Most royalty were buried along with headdress, bracelets, and necklaces. Once a tomb was closed, burning took place on top of it to signify the soul leaving the royal body and transforming into an ancestral state. The human remains in a temple were believed to have had power to animate buildings.

Often, whistles carved from rocks into the shapes of gods or animals were included in the grave offerings to help the deceased find their way to Xibalba (She-BALba). When a typical Maya citizen died their family and close friends would begin fasting and procuring goods. To which then they would hold an all-night vigil around the corpse and burn incense calling on their ancestors to watch over the new soul in its journey in the underworld. The elders would then wash and clothe the corpse; being buried naked was an insult in Maya culture. Being buried naked meant you were usually a foreign captive. The elders then would carry the corpse to the church. Elders could only handle the corpse rather than the family because there was fear of impotent taken into death by the soul. On the way to the church the chuchjaw would beat the ground so the soul would not linger on Earth. Once at the church, elders would spin the corpse several times so the soul would lose track from its home. Once the corpse was buried the family would hold a feast and abandon the person's house who has passed. The houses of the dead become abandoned because it was believed that nine days after a successful journey through the underworld by the soul it would return to its home and sleep for nine days. It is during this nine-day period that the Maya believed they could die by the soul who has returned home. The Maya associated the color red with death and rebirth and often covered graves and skeletal remains with cinnabar. The bodies of the dead were wrapped in cotton mantles before being buried. Burial sites were oriented to provide access to the otherworld. Graves faced north or west, in the directions of the Maya heavens, and others were located in caves, entrances to the underworld.

Burial practices of the Maya changed over the course of time. In the late Preclassic period, people were buried in a flexed position, later the dead were laid to rest in an extended position. In the late Classic period, the elite constructed vaulted tombs, and some rulers ordered the construction of large burial complexes. In the Postclassic period, cremation became more common. Other burial practices included bodily humanation with structures, structures directly overhead of the burial site, preferred single interments over multiple interments, the removal of skulls with a bowl or shell over or under the skull, specific skeletal position, prevailing head orientations, jade mosaic masks, and shell figurines. In Maya culture the dead would be steeled like the Hero Twins to have a better chance in their journey. Most of the Maya are mostly found in Dangriga so called "Downsouth" in the southern of Belize country well known called a unique county by the Belizean because Belize is in both Central America and part of the Caribbean.

== Beliefs about the afterlife ==
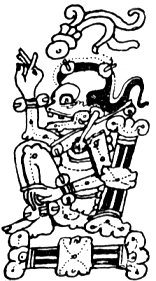
Maya death god in the lunar eclipse tables of the Dresden Codex

The Maya believe that the soul is bound to the body at birth. Only death or sickness can part the body and soul, with death being the permanent parting. To them, there is an afterlife that the soul reaches after death. In that, deceased ancestors can still contact their descendants, answering advice when they are asked. This contact can be used at certain times in the season, or when certain family matters pertain to the ancestors. Understanding the perception of what the deceased do in their afterlife can give ideas towards what rituals need to be performed and what types of items one must be buried with in order to successfully navigate the afterlife.

=== Reincarnation ===
The aspect of reincarnation is one strongly mentioned in Maya beliefs and religion. The Popol Vuh gives importance to the Maize deity, and how the Maya people themselves descended from maize people created by this god. In the Popol Vuh that the Kʼicheʼ Maya wrote, one of the few surviving codices, it tells the story of the reincarnation of the Maize god. In the tale, the maize god retreats to the underworld and with two hero twins battling the monsters and lords of the place, makes way back to the earthen world. He is reborn again, dies, and on and on the cycle continues. In this aspect, it is believed by the Maya that the Earth itself is a living being. As they came from corn, consuming corn or having sex then brings one closer to the earth.

=== Ideas about the afterlife ===
The concept of the afterlife, or Xibalba, differs between the Maya ethnic groups. Many have a generalized belief of all souls going to the afterlife, being reincarnated or having another role to participate in after death, but these ideas change dramatically with the rise of Christianity. With that came the idea of Xibalba being a location of punishment. The longer one spent in Xibalba, the worse a life they led while living. With this belief, heaven became a paradise for many to strive for. The Chontal of Tabasco are an example of this.

==== Ethnic groups ====
To the Awakateko and the Chuj, the ancestors remain in contact and have the ability to affect the affairs of the living even in death. The Awakateko believed that the afterlife is a place where all ancestors remain, and that there is nowhere to pass on to. But to the Chuj, any contracts made with the dead are binding. If one does not follow these contracts, the ancestor can plague the one bound to the contract with illness or misfortune. To Them, they can contact their ancestors at altars, caves, or places connected to Maya societies. The association of caves to the underworld is one intertwined with the older Maya civilization and is an aspect continued by the Chuj people.

There are other ethnic groups that believe ritual items are needed in order to make the journey into the afterlife. The Lakandon bury their people facing the sun, and wrapped in a tunic and hammock. Qʼeqchiʼ bury their dead in a straw sleeping mat, with a hat, sandals and a net provided to help in the journey to the afterlife. In others it was believed a dog was needed to help make the journey through the afterlife. Often a dog was ritually sacrificed, or an effigy buried along with the deceased in order to complete this task. Usually, the goods buried with the person were what the tribe believed was needed to complete one's cross into the next, whether it be the afterlife, heaven or reincarnation.

Other ethnic groups believed that the spirits of the dead still had tasks to complete in the afterlife. The Mam, before fully accepting Christian values thought that the dead lived within volcanoes and other places. To the Tzʼutujil, souls of the dead might be reincarnated or go to assist in moving the sun across the sky. The Tzʼutujil in Santiago feared that souls of drowning victims inhabited the bottom of Lake Atitlan. With this difference in the idea of what one's ancestor does in death, came a change in how and what they were buried with. Those who still had a journey or a task may need more or less items, and it depended on how those of the tribe believed on what occurred after death.

But many ethnic groups also observed a celebration of their deceased ancestors later on. The Poqomam gather after death and hold a feast that may last for nine days. Then they pray for that deceased person every day of the dead for the next seven years. The Tzotzil of Chamula also have a similar holiday for celebrating the dead, though theirs occurs every year. Their belief is that souls return to visit and partake of food once a year, in a celebration called Kʼin Santo. The family members must perform a ritual to the deities to ask release of the souls of their dead relatives and to allow them entrance into the house.

== Tombs ==
There have been many archaeological discoveries of lavish tombs within ceremonial complexes from the Classic period. However, only a Maya city's most important ruler was buried in this way. These aristocrats were placed in tombs at the bottoms of funerary pyramids that sometimes consisted of nine stepped platforms, perhaps symbolizing the nine layers of the underworld. Other temples were constructed with 13 vaults symbolizing the layers of the heavens in Maya cosmology. These temples reflected the continued worship of these nobles. In some instances, members of the royal family or young attendants would be sacrificed to accompany the lord in death.

The tombs were filled with precious goods including fine polychrome pottery, effigy figurines, jade and marble pieces, masks, mushroom figures. While these figures were found in Maya tombs, many of these items were also used in the service of food, drink and for additional ritual purposes. Obsidian and exotic shells have also been found in Maya tombs. In the Tomb of the Red Queen inside Temple XIII in Palenque, the remains of a noble woman and all the objects inside the sarcophagus were completely covered with bright red vermilion dust, made of ground cinnabar, perhaps intended to suggest blood, the symbol of life.

Other elite members of society were buried in vaults. The bodies of higher-ranking members of society were buried inside sarcophagi. They sometimes were buried in crypts or underneath the family home. These funerary constructions of the royal often destroyed the residence itself. Commoners were also buried near or under their houses. These graves did not have extensive burial offerings, but often contained objects that identified the individual: a tool or possession.
