= Montroydite =

Mercury(II) oxide mineral, HgO

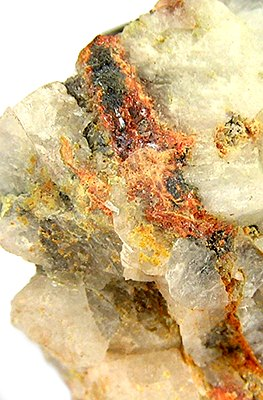
- Vein of dark red montroydite and orange kleinite in a matrix of white calcite

General
- Category: Oxide mineral
- Formula: HgO
- IMA symbol: Mtyd
- Strunz classification: 4.AC.15
- Crystal system: Orthorhombic
- Crystal class: Dipyramidal (mmm); H-M Symbol: (2/m 2/m 2/m)
- Unit cell: a = 5.52 Å, b = 6.6 Å, c = 3.52 Å; Z=4

Identification
- Color: Deep red, brownish red to brown
- Crystal habit: Long prismatic, equant, rarely flattened; striated; massive to vermicular clusters
- Cleavage: Perfect {010}
- Tenacity: Sectile
- Mohs scale hardness: 1.5 - 2.0
- Luster: Sub-adamantine, vitreous
- Streak: Yellow brown
- Diaphaneity: Transparent to translucent
- Specific gravity: 11.23
- Optical properties: Biaxial (+)
- Refractive index: n_{α} = 2.370 n_{β} = 2.500 n_{γ} = 2.650
- Birefringence: δ = 0.280
- Pleochroism: Deep red-orange to yellowish brown (visible in thick sections)
- 2V angle: Large

Montroydite is the mineral form of mercury(II) oxide with formula HgO. It is a rare mercury mineral. It was first described for an occurrence in the mercury deposit at Terlingua, Texas and named for Montroyd Sharp who was an owner of the deposit.

Montroydite occurs in mercury deposits of hydrothermal origin. Associated minerals include: native mercury, cinnabar, metacinnabar, calomel, eglestonite, terlinguaite, mosesite, kleinite, edgarbaileyite, gypsum, calcite and dolomite.
