= Kadyrelite =

Mercury(I) oxyhalide mineral

General
- Category: Minerals
- Formula: Hg_{4}(Br,Cl)_{2}O
- IMA symbol: Kad
- Crystal system: Isometric

Identification
- Color: Bright to dull orange
- Cleavage: None
- Tenacity: Brittle
- Mohs scale hardness: 2.5–3
- Luster: Adamantine, Vitreous
- Streak: Orange-yellow
- Specific gravity: 8.79

Kadyrelite is a mineral with the chemical formula Hg_{4}(Br,Cl)_{2}O discovered in 1987.
