= Mosesite =

Dimercury imide mineral

General
- Category: Halide minerals
- Formula: Hg_{2}N(Cl,SO_{4},MoO_{4},CO_{3})·H_{2}O
- IMA symbol: Mos
- Strunz classification: 3.DD.30
- Crystal system: Cubic
- Crystal class: Hextetrahedral (4̅3m); H-M symbol: (4̅ 3m)
- Space group: F4̅3m

Identification
- Color: Lemon-yellow, canary-yellow
- Crystal habit: Octahedral, cubo-octahedral, cubic
- Twinning: Twin plane {111}
- Cleavage: Imperfect {111}
- Fracture: Uneven
- Tenacity: Brittle
- Mohs scale hardness: 3.5
- Luster: Adamantine
- Streak: Very light yellow
- Optical properties: Isotropic
- Solubility: Changes to white substance in cold HCl
- Alters to: Turns a faint olivine green color with lengthy exposure to light

Mosesite is a very rare mineral found in few locations. It is a mercury mineral found as an accessory in deposits of mercury, often in conjunction with limestone. It is known to be found in the U.S. states of Texas and Nevada, and the Mexican states of Guerrero and Querétaro. It was named after Professor Alfred J. Moses (1859–1920) for his contributions to the field of mineralogy in discovering several minerals found alongside mosesite. The mineral itself is various shades of yellow and a high occurrence of spinel twinning. It becomes isotropic when heated to 186 °C (367 °F).

== Composition ==
Mosesite contains 16 Hg, 3 Cl, 1 1/2 SO_{4}, 1/2 CO_{3}, 1/2 MoO_{4}, 16 H, and 8 N with a volume of 0.84777 nm^{3} and calculated density of 7.53 g/cm^{3}. Its chemical formula is Hg_{2}N(Cl,SO_{4},MoO_{4},CO_{3})·H_{2}O.

== Geologic occurrence ==
Discovered in a mercury mine in Terlingua, Texas, mosesite has also been seen in Nevada and Mexico. Mosesite is a secondary mineral formed at low temperature in hydrothermal mercury deposits. The mercury ore at the mine in Huahuaxtla is aligned with ribs of brecciated limestone that formed along a shallow-angle fault plane. In the Huahuaxtla mine, this is due to the evidence of oxidized minerals. The portion of the mine in which the mosesite was found is thought to be a solution cavity in a zone of fractured limestone. Mosesite is never found in abundance in any of the known locations of its origin. Mineral associations include montroydite, calcite, gypsum, and at some localities native mercury.

== Structure ==
Spinel twinning is a common occurrence in mosesite. Mosesite was found to have a unit cell with diamond type space lattice and the measured unit cube of Mosesite was approximately 0.944 nm with additional forms {001}, {011}, {116}, {114}, and {112}. In Mexico, the mosesite was most usually found as octahedral crystals which were usually intergrown. Single crystals are rare. Mosesite has a similar structure to Millon’s base (Hg_{2}NOH•nH_{2}0). Mosesite consists of a three-dimensional framework of Hg_{2}N^{+} groups. The mercury atoms form linear sp bonds, while the nitrogen forms tetrahedral sp3 bonds, in a face-centered cubic lattice. The space group of mosesite is F*43m.

== Physical properties ==
Mosesite is a minute yellow crystal with imperfect cleavage along {111} and uneven fracture. It is brittle with a hardness of 3.5. Long exposure, a month or more, to light will change Mosesite to a light olive green color. The powdered form retains its color streaking a light yellow. The mineral exhibits no pleochroism and displays uneven birefringence in polarized light. Heat has a notable effect on Mosesite for when heated above 186 °C (367 °F) the mineral becomes isotropic. This corresponds optically with the observed crystal form only at this higher temperature. It is considered weakly anisotropic. The index of refraction is n = 2.065±0.01. It has an adamantine luster that officially ranges in color from lemon yellow to canary yellow. Mosesite reacts chemically with HCl leaving a residue of HgCl.

== Bibliography ==
- Palache, P.; Berman H.; Frondel, C. (1960). "Dana's System of Mineralogy, Volume II: Halides, Nitrates, Borates, Carbonates, Sulfates, Phosphates, Arsenates, Tungstates, Molybdates, Etc. (Seventh Edition)" John Wiley and Sons, Inc., New York, pp. 89-90.
