= Wattersite =

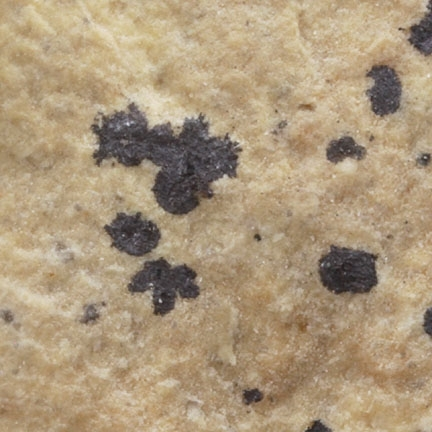
- Black crystals of wattersite with yellowish zones of edgarbaileyite. Locality: Clear Creek claim (Clear Creek Mine), Picacho Peak, New Idria District, Diablo Range, San Benito Co., California, USA. Dimensions: 6.6 cm x 4.8 cm x 4.1 cm

General
- Category: Chromate mineral
- Formula: Hg^{+1}_{4}Hg^{+2}Cr^{+6}O_{6}
- IMA symbol: Wte
- Strunz classification: 7.FB.15
- Dana classification: 35.4.2.1
- Crystal system: Monoclinic
- Crystal class: 2/m
- Space group: C2/c (number 15)
- Unit cell: 859.81 Å³

Identification
- Color: Dark red-brown to black
- Crystal habit: Prismatic, aggregates, massive
- Twinning: [001], contact twins on {100}
- Cleavage: None
- Fracture: Conchoidal
- Tenacity: Brittle
- Mohs scale hardness: 4.5
- Luster: Sub-Metallic
- Streak: Brick red
- Diaphaneity: Opaque
- Specific gravity: 8.91
- Optical properties: Biaxial
- Refractive index: n_{α} = 2.440 - 2.520 n_{γ} = 2.700 - 2.860
- Birefringence: δ = 0.260 - 0.340
- Pleochroism: Visible
- Dispersion: r > v strong

Wattersite is a rare mercury chromate mineral with the formula Hg^{+1}_{4}Hg^{+2}Cr^{+6}O_{6}. It occurs in association with native mercury and cinnabar in a hydrothermally altered serpentinite. It was first described from Clear Creek claim, San Benito County, California, USA in 1961. It was named to honor Californian mineral collector Lucius "Lu" Watters.
