= Samuel Cartwright =

British dentist (1789 – 1864)

Samuel Carwright
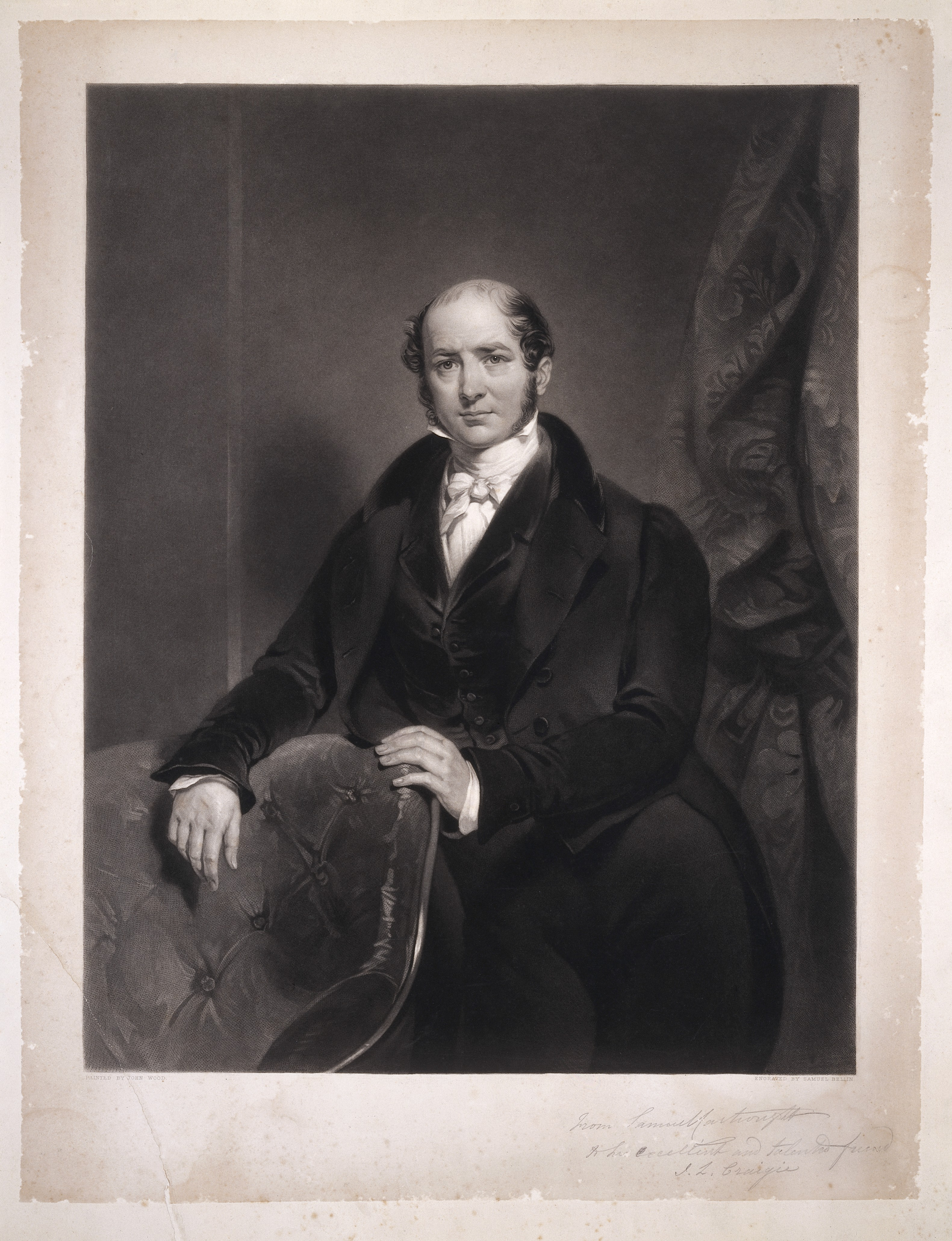
- Born: September 7, 1788; London
- Died: June 10, 1864 (aged 75); Tonbridge
- Occupation: Dentist

Samuel Cartwright FRS (7 September 1788 – 10 June 1864) was a British dentist.

== Early life ==
Samuel Cartwright was the son of Thomas Cartwright and his wife Catherine (née Bentley). He was born in High Holborn, on 7 September 1788.

The Oxford Dictionary of National Biography erroneously gives his birthplace and date as Northampton in 1789, and, perhaps correctly, states that he was originally an ivory turner.

== Career ==
He started his career as a mechanical assistant to Charles Dumergue of Piccadilly, dentist to George IV. He demonstrated his skills as an ivory turner constructing dentures.

During this service he attended anatomical and surgical lectures. In 1811 he started to practice on his own account. He soon acquired a positive reputation. During much of his career he typically saw forty to fifty patients every day.

He stood for 12 hours, from seven o'clock in the morning into the evening.

His income was often upwards of £10,000. He became a fellow of the Linnean Society on 19 Nov. 1833, a Fellow of the Royal Society on 11 Feb. 1841, and was also a fellow of the Geological Society, but never found time to make contributions to the Proceedings of these institutions.

He retired in 1857. In the following year he had an apoplectic seizure which resulted in palsy, under which he laboured for the rest of his life.

== Personal life ==
His son, Samuel Cartwright junior FRCS LDS took over the practice and was in turn succeeded by his sons Samuel Hamilton and Alexander Cartwright.

He died at his residence, Nizell's House, near Tonbridge, on 10 June 1864. Obituaries of Samuel Cartwright appeared in the British Journal of Dental Science and the Dental Review.
