= Metacinnabar =

Cubic form of mercury sulfide

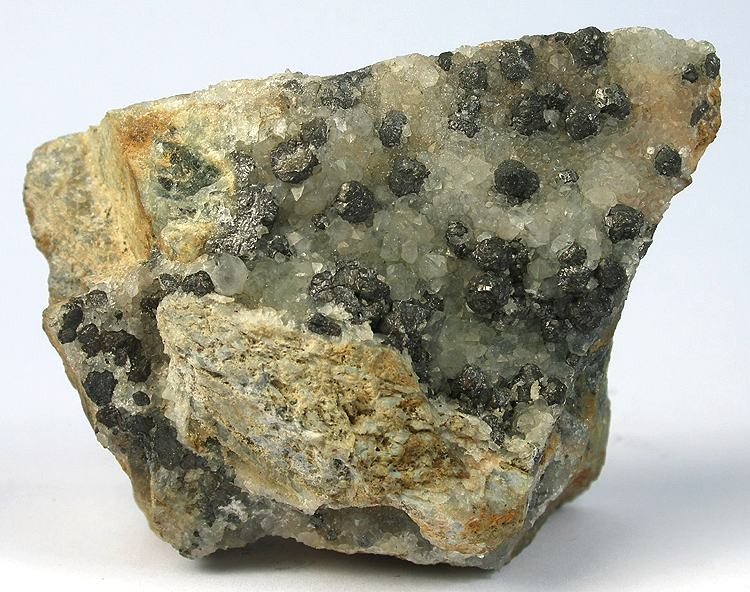

General
- Category: Sulfide mineral
- Formula: HgS
- IMA symbol: Mcin
- Strunz classification: 2.CB.05a
- Crystal system: Cubic
- Crystal class: Hextetrahedral (4̅ 3m)
- Space group: F4̅ 3m
- Unit cell: a=5.8717(5) Å; Z=4

Structure
- Jmol (3D): Interactive image

Identification
- Color: Grayish black
- Crystal habit: Massive, rarely as tetrahedral crystals, as incrustations
- Twinning: Common as lamellae on {111}
- Cleavage: None
- Fracture: Subconchoidal
- Tenacity: Brittle
- Mohs scale hardness: 3
- Luster: Metallic
- Streak: Black
- Diaphaneity: Opaque
- Specific gravity: 7.7–7.8

Metacinnabar is the cubic form of mercury sulfide (HgS). It is the high temperature form and trimorphous with cinnabar (trigonal structure) and the higher temperature hypercinnabar (hexagonal structure). It occurs with cinnabar in mercury deposits and is associated with native mercury, wurtzite, stibnite, marcasite, realgar, calcite, barite, chalcedony and hydrocarbons.

It was first described in 1870 for an occurrence in the Redington mine, Knoxville, Napa County, California.
