= Mercury(I) oxide =

Identifiers
CAS Number	15829-53-5
3D model (JSmol)	Interactive image; Interactive image
ChemSpider	17615579
ECHA InfoCard	100.036.289
EC Number	239-934-0
PubChem CID	16683011
UNII	0I308SWC92
UN number	1641
CompTox Dashboard (EPA)	DTXSID3065954
- InChI: InChI=1S/2Hg.O Key: RPZHFKHTXCZXQV-UHFFFAOYSA-N
- SMILES: O([Hg])[Hg]; [O-2].[Hg+].[Hg+]

Properties
Chemical formula	Hg_{2}O
Molar mass	417.183 g·mol^{−1}
Appearance	Very dark, orange, opaque crystals
Odor	Odourless
Density	9.8 g mL^{−1}
Magnetic susceptibility (χ)	−76.3·10^{−6} cm^{3}/mol

Hazards
- Occupational safety and health (OHS/OSH)
Main hazards	highly toxic
- GHS labelling
Pictograms	(GHS07: Exclamation mark) (GHS08: Health hazard)
Signal word	Danger
Hazard statements	H315, H317, H320, H335, H341, H361, H370, H372
Precautionary statements	P201, P202, P260, P264, P270, P271, P272, P280, P281, P302+P352, P304+P340, P305+P351+P338, P307+P311, P308+P313, P312, P314, P321, P332+P313, P333+P313, P337+P313, P362, P363, P403+P233, P405, P501
NFPA 704 (fire diamond)	4 0 1
- Lethal dose or concentration (LD, LC)
LD_{50} (median dose)	18 mg/kg (oral, rat)
- Except where otherwise noted, data are given for materials in their standard state (at 25 °C [77 °F], 100 kPa). verify (what is ?) Infobox references

Mercury(I) oxide, also known as mercurous oxide, is an inorganic metal oxide with the chemical formula Hg_{2}O.

It is a brown/black powder, insoluble in water but soluble in nitric acid. With hydrochloric acid, it reacts to form calomel, Hg_{2}Cl_{2}. Mercury(I) oxide is toxic but without taste or smell. It is chemically unstable, disproportionating to yield mercury(II) oxide and mercury metal.

Hg_{2}O → HgO + Hg
