= Cinnabar =

Red mercury(II) sulfide mineral, HgS

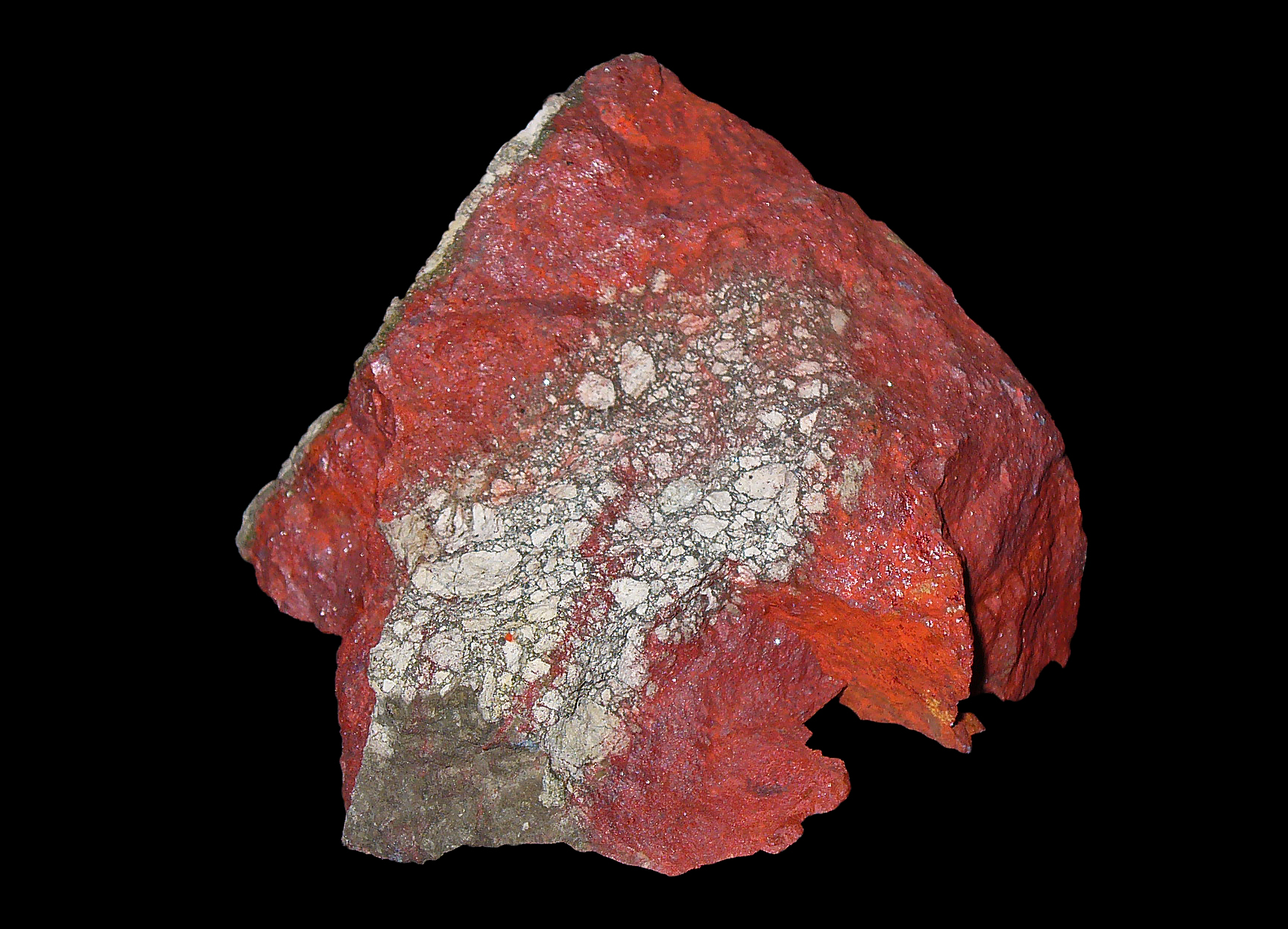
- Cinnabar, Staatliches Museum für Naturkunde Karlsruhe, Germany

General
- Category: Sulfide mineral
- Formula: Mercury(II) sulfide, HgS
- IMA symbol: Cin
- Strunz classification: 2.CD.15a
- Crystal system: Trigonal
- Crystal class: Trapezohedral (32) (same H–M symbol)
- Space group: P3_{1}21, P3_{2}21
- Unit cell: a = 4.145(2) Å, c = 9.496(2) Å, Z = 3

Identification
- Color: Cochineal-red, towards brownish red and lead-gray
- Crystal habit: Rhombohedral to tabular; granular to massive and as incrustations
- Twinning: Simple contact twins, twin plane {0001}
- Cleavage: Prismatic {101̅0}, perfect
- Fracture: Uneven to subconchoidal
- Tenacity: Slightly sectile
- Mohs scale hardness: 2.0–2.5
- Luster: Adamantine to dull
- Streak: Scarlet
- Diaphaneity: Transparent in thin pieces
- Specific gravity: 8.176
- Optical properties: Uniaxial (+); very high relief
- Refractive index: n_{ω} = 2.905 n_{ε} = 3.256
- Birefringence: δ = 0.351
- Solubility: 1.04×10^{−25} g/100 ml water (K_{sp} at 25 °C = 2×10^{−32})

Cinnabar (/ˈsɪnəˌbɑːr/; from Ancient Greek κιννάβαρι (kinnábari)), also called cinnabarite (/ˌsɪnəˈbɑːraɪt/) or mercurblende, is the bright scarlet to brick-red form of mercury(II) sulfide (HgS). It is the most common source ore for refining elemental mercury and is the historic source for the brilliant red or scarlet pigment termed vermilion and associated red mercury pigments.

Cinnabar generally occurs as a vein-filling mineral associated with volcanic activity and alkaline hot springs. The mineral resembles quartz in symmetry and it exhibits birefringence. Cinnabar has a mean refractive index near 3.2, a hardness between 2.0 and 2.5, and a specific gravity of approximately 8.1. The color and properties derive from a structure that is a hexagonal crystalline lattice belonging to the trigonal crystal system, crystals that sometimes exhibit twinning.

Cinnabar has been used for its color since antiquity in the Near East, including as a rouge-type cosmetic, in the New World since the Olmec culture, and in China since as early as the Yangshao culture, where it was used in coloring stoneware. In Roman times, cinnabar was highly valued as paint for walls, especially interiors, since it darkened when used outdoors due to exposure to sunlight.

Associated modern precautions for the use and handling of cinnabar arise from the toxicity of the mercury component, which was recognized as early as ancient Rome.

== Etymology ==
The name comes from Greek κιννάβαρι (kinnabari), a Greek word most likely applied by Theophrastus to several distinct substances. In Latin, it was sometimes known as minium, meaning also "red cinnamon", though both of these terms now refer specifically to lead tetroxide.

== Properties and structure ==
=== Properties ===
Cinnabar is generally found in a massive, granular, or earthy form and is bright scarlet to brick-red in color, though it occasionally occurs in crystals with a nonmetallic adamantine luster. It resembles quartz in its symmetry. It exhibits birefringence, and it has the second-highest refractive index of any mineral. Its mean refractive index is 3.08 (sodium light wavelengths), versus the indices for diamond and the non-mineral gallium(III) arsenide (GaAs), which are 2.42 and 3.93, respectively. The hardness of cinnabar is 2.0–2.5 on the Mohs scale, and its specific gravity 8.1.

=== Structure ===
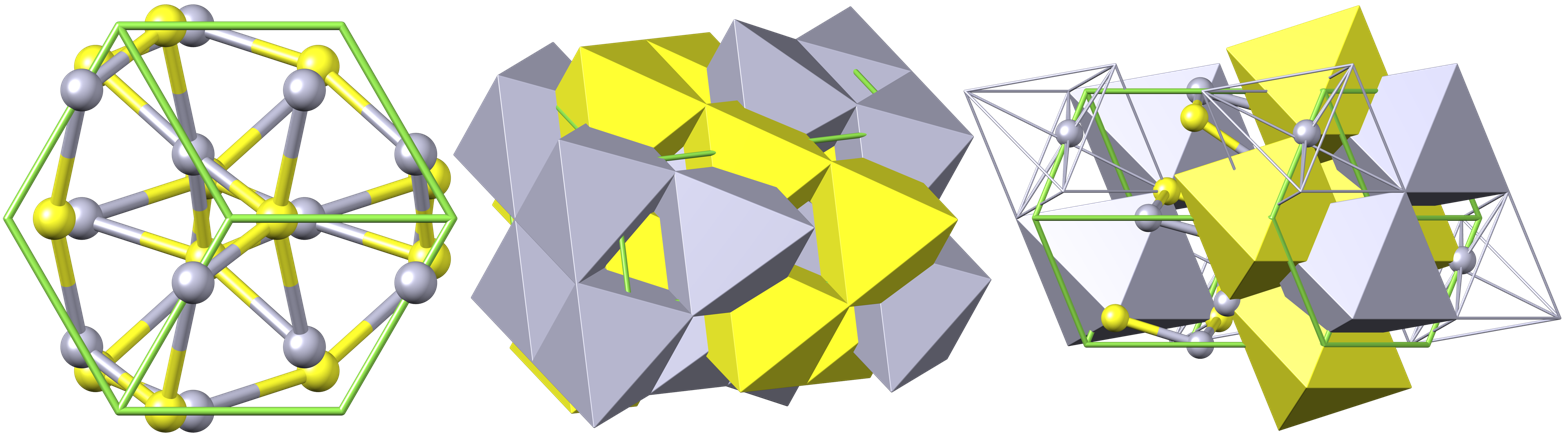
Crystal structure of cinnabar: yellow = sulfur, grey = mercury, green = cell

Structurally, cinnabar belongs to the trigonal crystal system. It occurs as thick tabular or slender prismatic crystals or as granular to massive incrustations. Crystal twinning occurs as simple contact twins.

Mercury(II) sulfide, HgS, adopts the cinnabar structure described, and one additional structure, i.e. it is dimorphous. Cinnabar is the more stable form, and is a structure akin to that of HgO: each Hg center has two short Hg−S bonds (each 2.36 Å), and four longer Hg···S contacts (with 3.10, 3.10, 3.30 and 3.30 Å separations). In addition, HgS is found in a black, non-cinnabar polymorph (metacinnabar) that has the zincblende structure.

== Occurrence ==
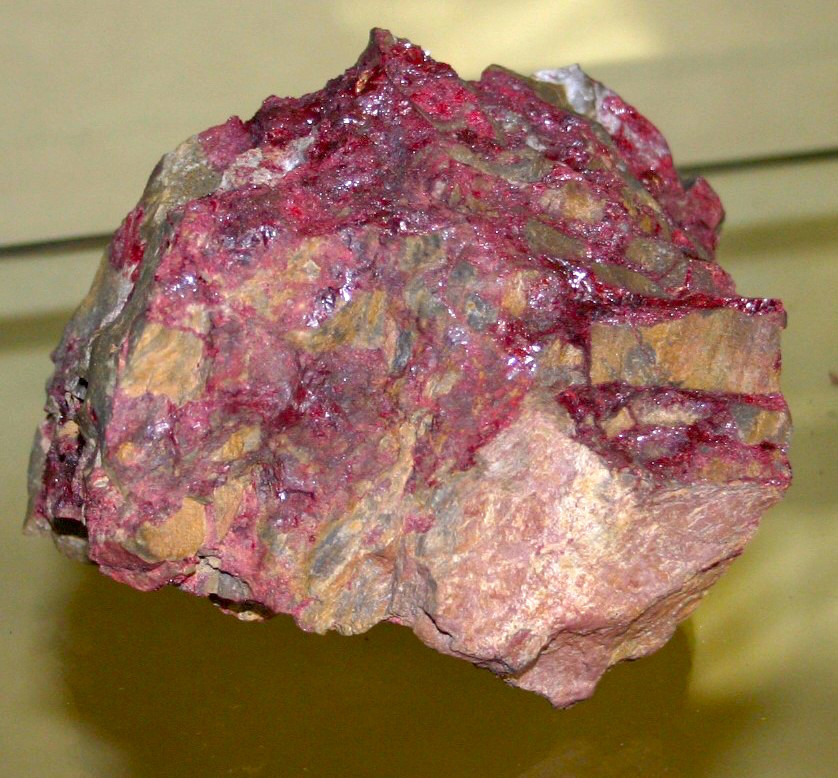
Cinnabar mercury ore from Nevada, United States

Cinnabar generally occurs as a vein-filling mineral associated with volcanic activity and alkaline hot springs. Cinnabar is deposited by epithermal ascending aqueous solutions (those near the surface and not too hot) far removed from their igneous source. It is associated with native mercury, stibnite, realgar, pyrite, marcasite, opal, quartz, chalcedony, dolomite, calcite, and barite.

Cinnabar is found in essentially all mineral extraction localities that yield mercury, most notably Almadén (Spain). This mine was exploited from Roman times until 2001, being for centuries the most important cinnabar deposit in the world; good cinnabar crystals have been found there. Other cinnabar deposits appear in Giza (Egypt); Puerto Princesa (Philippines); Red Devil, Alaska; Murfreesboro, Arkansas; the New Almaden Mine in San Jose, the Hastings and St. John's Mines in Vallejo, as well as the general area of New Idria, all in California; Terlingua, Texas (United States); Idrija (Slovenia); Moschellandsberg near Obermoschel in the Palatinate (Germany); the La Ripa and Levigliani mines at the foot of the Apuan Alps and in Mount Amiata, both in Tuscany (Italy); Avala (Serbia); Huancavelica (Peru); the province of Guizhou (China); and Western Ghats (India), where fine crystals have been obtained. It has also been found in Dominica near its sulfur springs at the southern end of the island along the west coast.

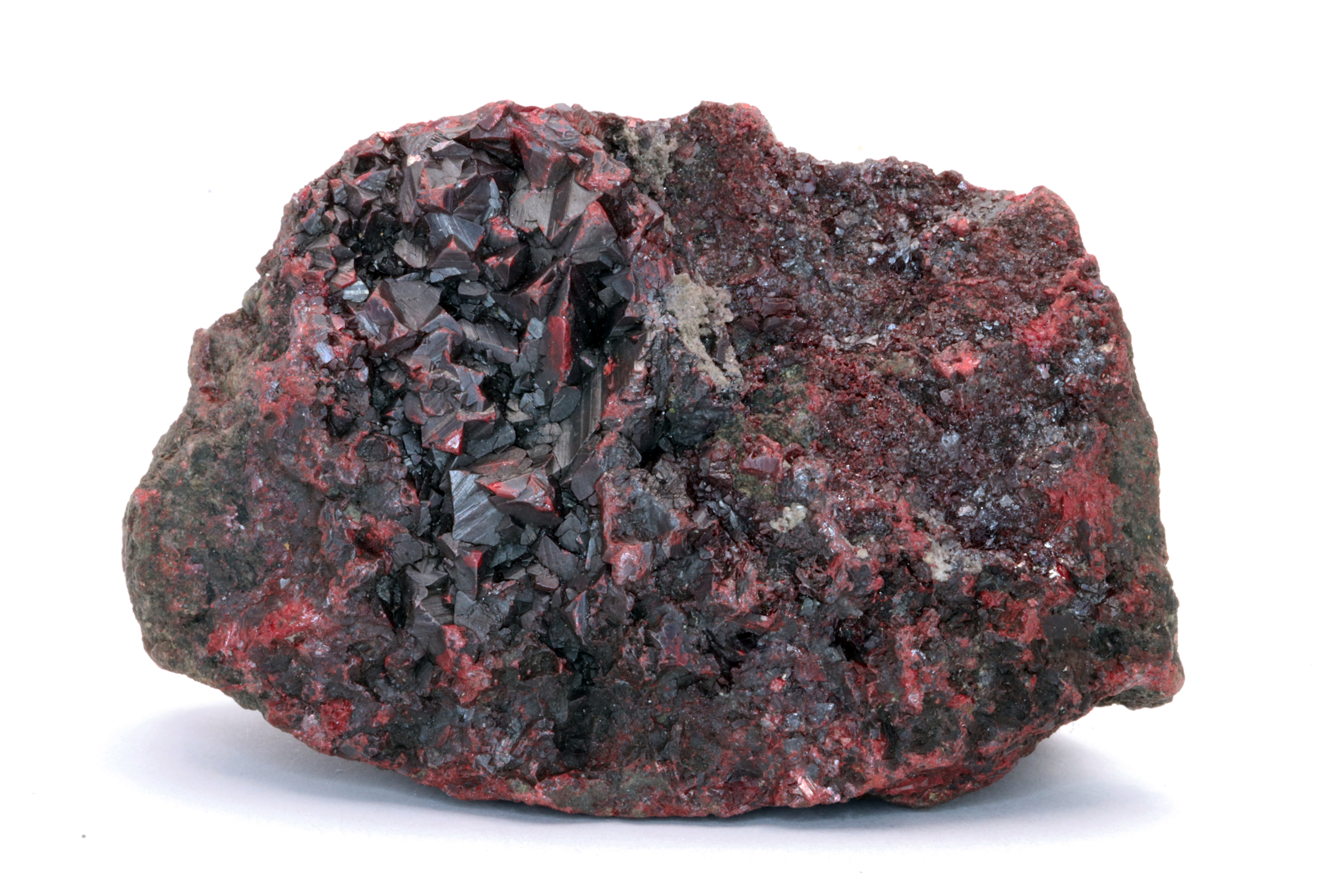
Specimen composed of pure cinnabar, with the surface covered in crystals. Being an old specimen, they are partially darkened due to exposure to light. Almadén Mine, (Ciudad Real), Spain. Largest dimension, 6 cm.

Cinnabar is still being deposited, such as from the hot waters of Sulphur Bank Mine in California and Steamboat Springs, Nevada (United States).

== Mining and extraction of mercury ==
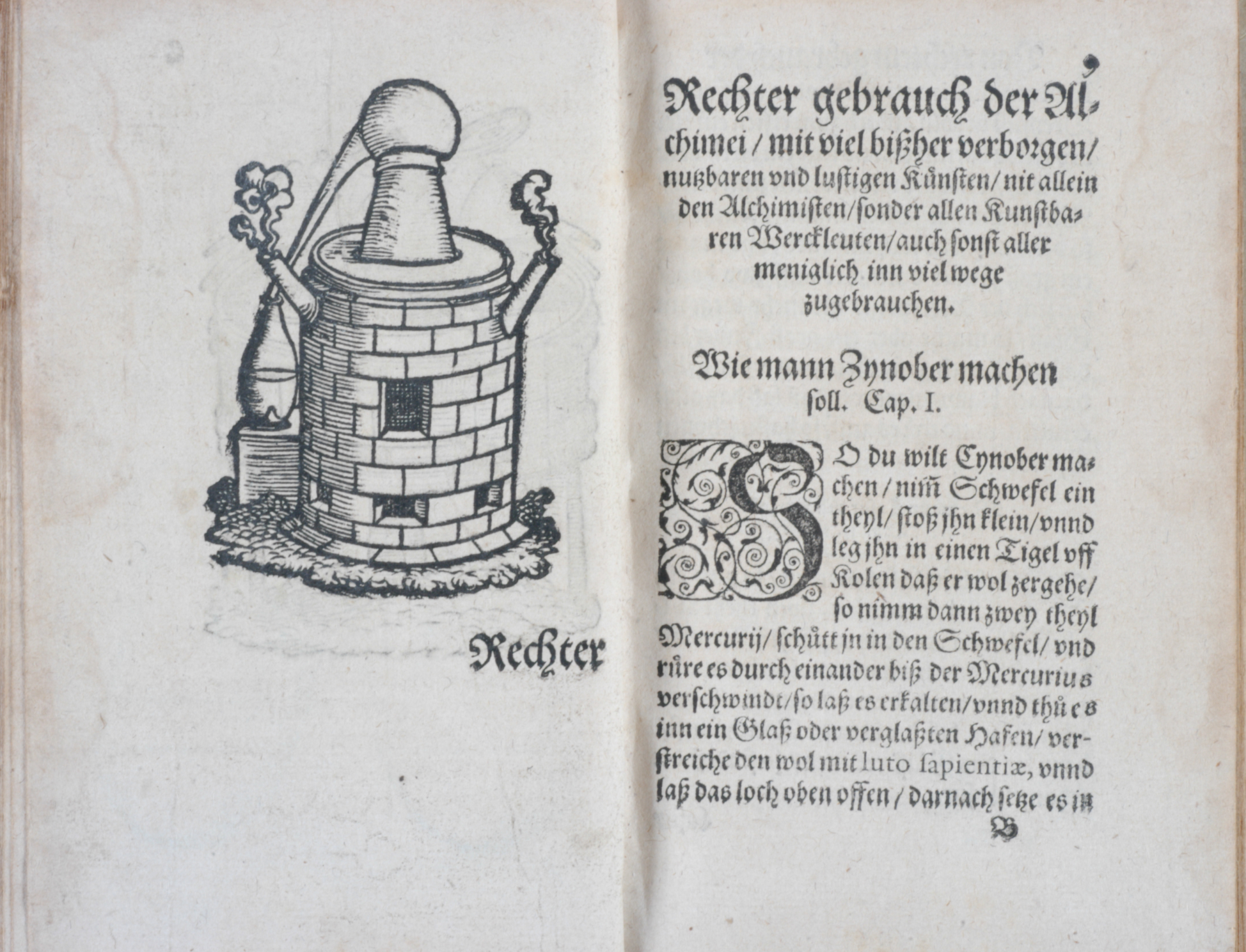
Apparatus for the distillation of cinnabar, Alchimia, 1570

As the most common source of mercury in nature, cinnabar has been mined for thousands of years, even as far back as the Neolithic Age. During the Roman Empire it was mined both as a pigment, and for its mercury content.

To produce liquid mercury (quicksilver), crushed cinnabar ore is roasted in rotary furnaces. Pure mercury separates from sulfur in this process and easily evaporates. A condensing column is used to collect the liquid metal, which is most often shipped in iron flasks.

== Toxicity ==
Associated modern precautions for use and handling of cinnabar arise from the toxicity of the mercury component, which was recognized as early as in ancient Rome. Because of its mercury content, cinnabar can be toxic to human beings. Overexposure to mercury, mercury poisoning (mercurialism), was seen as an occupational disease to the ancient Romans. Though people in ancient South America often used cinnabar for art, or processed it into refined mercury (as a means to gild silver and gold to objects), the toxic properties of mercury were well known. It was dangerous to those who mined and processed cinnabar; it caused shaking, loss of sense, and death. Data suggests that mercury was retorted from cinnabar and the workers were exposed to the toxic mercury fumes. "Mining in the Spanish cinnabar mines of Almadén, 225 km (140 mi) southwest of Madrid, was regarded as being akin to a death sentence due to the shortened life expectancy of the miners, who were slaves or convicts."

== Decorative use ==
Cinnabar has been used for its color since antiquity in the Near East, including as a rouge-type cosmetic, in the New World since the Olmec culture, and in China for writing on oracle bones as early as the Zhou dynasty. Late in the Song dynasty it was used in coloring lacquerware.

Chinese carved cinnabar lacquerware, from the late Qing dynasty

The most popularly known use of cinnabar is in Chinese carved lacquerware, a technique that apparently originated in the Song dynasty. The danger of mercury poisoning may be reduced in ancient lacquerware by entraining the powdered pigment in lacquer, but could still pose an environmental hazard if the pieces were accidentally destroyed. In the modern jewellery industry, the toxic pigment is replaced by a resin-based polymer that approximates the appearance of pigmented lacquer.

In the dolmenic burial known as La Velilla in Osorno (Palencia) Spain, from 5000 years ago, the bones are carefully covered by a large amount of pulverized cinnabar.

Cinnabar's use as a color in the New World, since the Olmec culture, is exemplified by its use in royal burial chambers during the peak of Maya civilization, most dramatically in the 7th-century tomb of the Red Queen in Palenque, where the remains of a noble woman and objects belonging to her in her sarcophagus were completely covered with bright red powder made from cinnabar. Two female mummies dated AD 1399 to 1475 found in Cerro Esmeralda in Chile in 1976 had clothes colored with cinnabar.

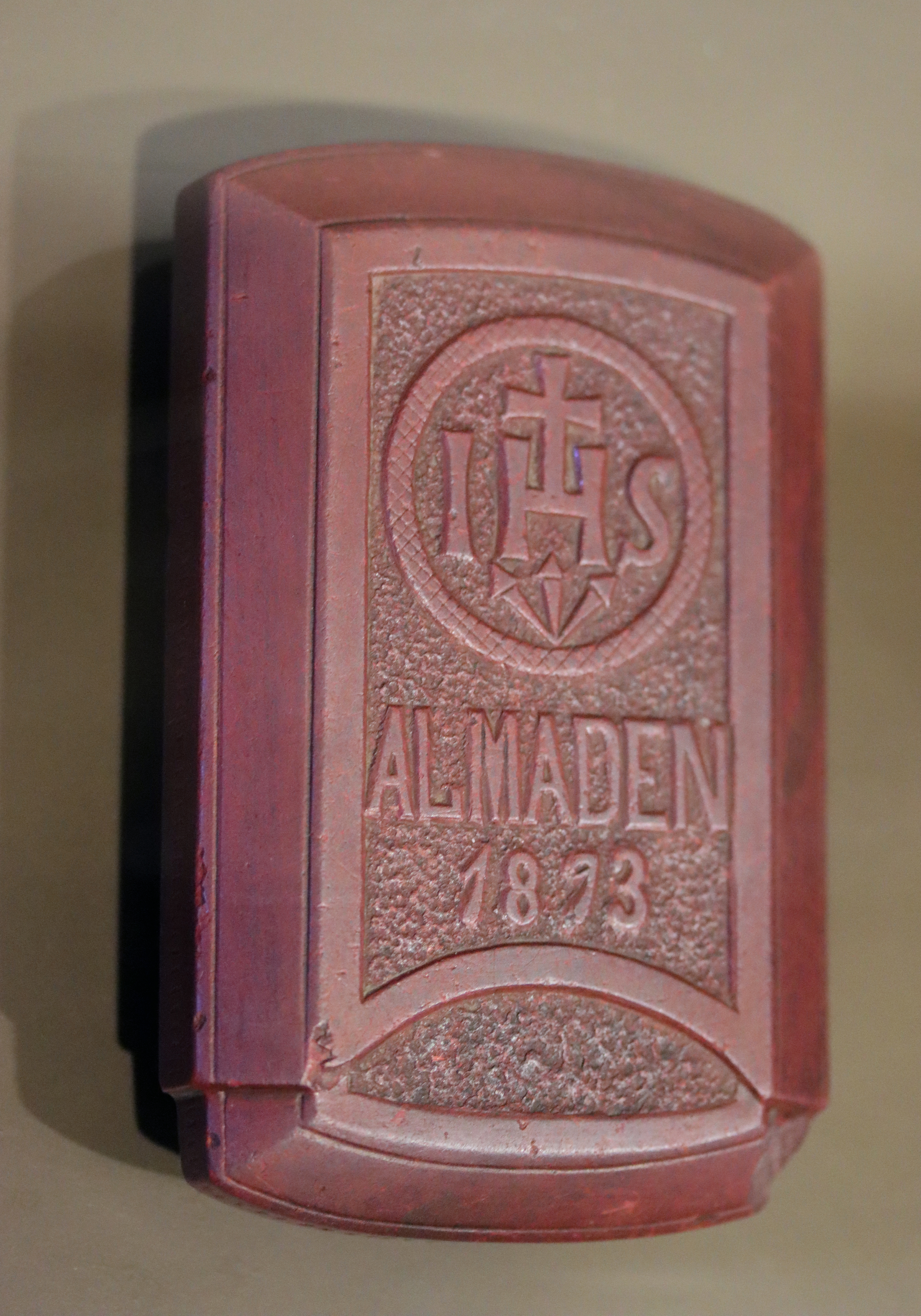
Carved cinnabar from Almadén, Spain

In the Almadén mines in Spain, cinnabar occasionally appeared as completely pure, very dense microcrystalline masses that were used in powdered form to color sealing wax, without any need for purification. They were also easy to carve, provided one overlooked the toxicity of mercury. This material was known as cinabrio de labra (“carving cinnabar”), and from the 18th century until the 1930s some artisans in Almadén crafted objects from it to present as gifts to distinguished visitors.

== Other forms ==
- Hepatic cinnabar, or paragite, is an impure brownish variety from the mines of Idrija in the Carniola region of Slovenia, in which the cinnabar is mixed with bituminous and earthy matter.
- Hypercinnabar crystallizes at high temperature in the hexagonal crystal system.
- Metacinnabar is a black-colored form of mercury(II) sulfide, which crystallizes in the cubic crystal system.
- Synthetic cinnabar is produced by treatment of mercury(II) salts with hydrogen sulfide to precipitate black, synthetic metacinnabar, which is then heated in water. This conversion is promoted by the presence of sodium sulfide.

== See also ==
- Classification of minerals
- List of minerals
- Mercury cycle
- Red pigments
- Pompeian Red
