= List of UN numbers 1601 to 1700 =

UN numbers from UN1601 to UN1700 as assigned by the United Nations Committee of Experts on the Transport of Dangerous Goods are as follows:

== UN 1601 to UN 1700 ==
UN Number	Class	Proper Shipping Name
UN 1601	6.1	Disinfectants, solid, toxic, n.o.s.
UN 1602	6.1	Dyes, liquid, toxic, n.o.s. or Dye intermediates, liquid, toxic, n.o.s.
UN 1603	6.1	Ethyl bromoacetate
UN 1604	8	Ethylenediamine
UN 1605	6.1	Ethylene dibromide
UN 1606	6.1	Ferric arsenate
UN 1607	6.1	Ferric arsenite
UN 1608	6.1	Ferrous arsenate
UN 1609	?	(UN No. no longer in use)
UN 1610	?	(UN No. no longer in use) Halogenated irritating liquids, n.o.s. (UN No. no longer in use)
UN 1611	6.1	Hexaethyl tetraphosphate, liquid or Hexaethyl tetraphosphate, solid
UN 1612	2	Hexaethyl tetraphosphate and compressed gas mixtures
UN 1613	6.1	Hydrocyanic acid, aqueous solutions or Hydrogen cyanide, aqueous solutions with not more than 20 percent hydrogen cyanide or Hydrocyanic acid, aqueous solutions with less than 5 percent hydrogen cyanide
UN 1614	6.1	Hydrogen cyanide, stabilized with less than 3 percent water and absorbed in a porous inert material
UN 1615	?	(UN No. no longer in use)
UN 1616	6.1	Lead acetate
UN 1617	6.1	Lead arsenates
UN 1618	6.1	Lead arsenites
UN 1619	?	(UN No. no longer in use)
UN 1620	6.1	Lead cyanide
UN 1621	6.1	London purple
UN 1622	6.1	Magnesium arsenate
UN 1623	6.1	Mercuric arsenate
UN 1624	6.1	Mercuric chloride
UN 1625	6.1	Mercuric nitrate
UN 1626	6.1	Mercuric potassium cyanide
UN 1627	6.1	Mercurous nitrate
UN 1628	?	(UN No. no longer in use) Mercurous sulfate, solid (UN No. no longer in use)
UN 1629	6.1	Mercury acetate
UN 1630	6.1	Mercury ammonium chloride
UN 1631	6.1	Mercury benzoate
UN 1632	?	(UN No. no longer in use)
UN 1633	?	(UN No. no longer in use) Mercury bisulfate (UN No. no longer in use)
UN 1634	6.1	Mercury bromides
UN 1635	?	(UN No. no longer in use)
UN 1636	6.1	Mercury cyanide
UN 1637	6.1	Mercury gluconate
UN 1638	6.1	Mercury iodide, solution or Mercury iodide, solid
UN 1639	6.1	Mercury nucleate
UN 1640	6.1	Mercury oleate
UN 1641	6.1	Mercury oxide
UN 1642	6.1	Mercury oxycyanide, desensitized
UN 1643	6.1	Mercury potassium iodide
UN 1644	6.1	Mercury salicylate
UN 1645	6.1	Mercury sulfates
UN 1646	6.1	Mercury thiocyanate
UN 1647	6.1	Methyl bromide and ethylene dibromide mixtures, liquid
UN 1648	3	Acetonitrile
UN 1649	6.1	Motor fuel anti-knock mixtures
UN 1650	6.1	beta-Naphthylamine
UN 1651	6.1	Naphthylthiourea
UN 1652	6.1	Naphthylurea
UN 1653	6.1	Nickel cyanide
UN 1654	6.1	Nicotine
UN 1655	6.1	Nicotine compounds, solid, n.o.s. or Nicotine preparations, solid, n.o.s.
UN 1656	6.1	Nicotine hydrochloride or Nicotine hydrochloride solution
UN 1657	6.1	Nicotine salicylate
UN 1658	6.1	Nicotine sulfate, solid or Nicotine sulfate, solution
UN 1659	6.1	Nicotine tartrate
UN 1660	2	Nitric oxide, compressed
UN 1661	6.1	Nitroanilines (o-; m-; p-;)
UN 1662	6.1	Nitrobenzene
UN 1663	6.1	Nitrophenols (o-; m-; p-;)
UN 1664	6.1	Nitrotoluenes, liquid (o-; m-; p-;) or Nitrotoluenes, solid (o-; m-; p-;)
UN 1665	6.1	Nitroxylenes (o-; m-; p-;)
UN 1666 to 1668	?	(UN No.s no longer in use)
UN 1669	6.1	Pentachloroethane
UN 1670	6.1	Perchloromethyl mercaptan
UN 1671	6.1	Phenol, solid
UN 1672	6.1	Phenylcarbylamine chloride
UN 1673	6.1	Phenylenediamines (o-; m-; p-;)
UN 1674	6.1	Phenylmercuric acetate
UN 1675 to 1676	?	(UN No.s no longer in use)
UN 1677	6.1	Potassium arsenate
UN 1678	6.1	Potassium arsenite
UN 1679	6.1	Potassium cuprocyanide
UN 1680	6.1	Potassium cyanide
UN 1681	?	(UN No. no longer in use) Rodenticides, n.o.s. (UN No. no longer in use)
UN 1682	?	(UN No. no longer in use)
UN 1683	6.1	Silver arsenite
UN 1684	6.1	Silver cyanide
UN 1685	6.1	Sodium arsenate
UN 1686	6.1	Sodium arsenite, aqueous solutions
UN 1687	6.1	Sodium azide
UN 1688	6.1	Sodium cacodylate
UN 1689	6.1	Sodium cyanide
UN 1690	6.1	Sodium fluoride
UN 1691	6.1	Strontium arsenite
UN 1692	6.1	Strychnine or Strychnine salts
UN 1693	6.1	Tear gas substances, liquid, n.o.s. or Tear gas substances, solid, n.o.s.
UN 1694	6.1	Bromobenzyl cyanides, liquid or Bromobenzyl cyanides, solid
UN 1695	6.1	Chloroacetone, stabilized
UN 1696	?	(UN No. no longer in use)
UN 1697	6.1	Chloroacetophenone (CN), liquid or Chloroacetophenone (CN), solid
UN 1698	6.1	Diphenylaminechloroarsine
UN 1699	6.1	Diphenylchloroarsine, liquid or Diphenylchloroarsine, solid
UN 1700	6.1	Tear gas candles

n.o.s. = not otherwise specified meaning a collective entry to which substances, mixtures, solutions or articles may be assigned if a) they are not mentioned by name in 3.2 Dangerous Goods List AND b) they exhibit chemical, physical and/or dangerous properties corresponding to the Class, classification code, packing group and the name and description of the n.o.s. entry

== See also ==
- Lists of UN numbers
