= Mercury(I) sulfate =

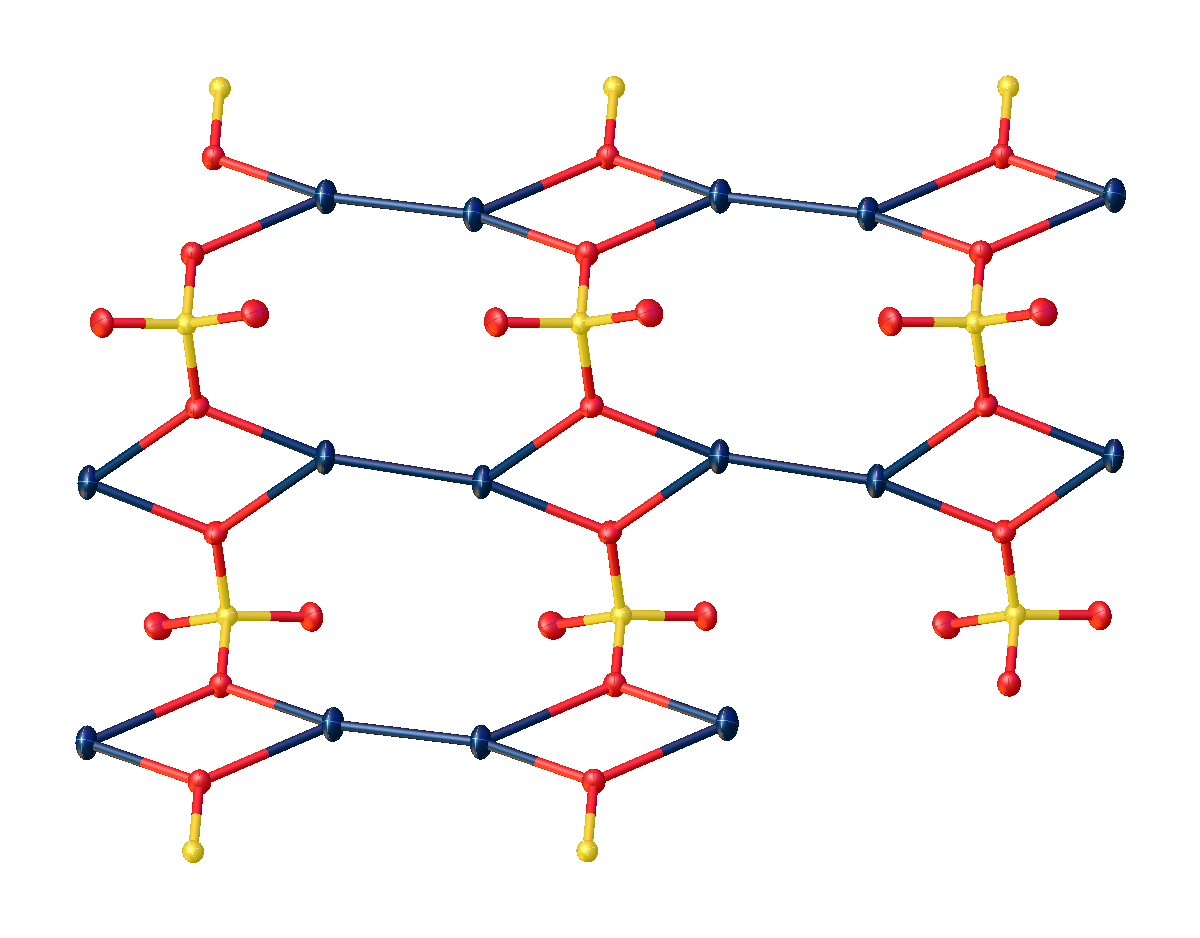

Names
- IUPAC name Mercury(I) sulfate
- Other names Mercurous sulfate

Identifiers
CAS Number	7783-36-0
3D model (JSmol)	Interactive image
ChemSpider	22951
ECHA InfoCard	100.029.084
EC Number	231-993-0
PubChem CID	24545
UNII	PI950N9DYS
CompTox Dashboard (EPA)	DTXSID9074565
- InChI: InChI=1S/2Hg.H2O4S/c;;1-5(2,3)4/h;;(H2,1,2,3,4)/q2*+1;/p-2 Key: MINVSWONZWKMDC-UHFFFAOYSA-L
- SMILES: [O-]S(=O)(=O)[O-].[Hg+][Hg+]

Properties
Chemical formula	Hg_{2}SO_{4}
Molar mass	497.24 g/mol
Appearance	whitish-yellow crystals
Density	7.56 g/cm^{3}
Solubility in water	0.051 g/100 mL (25 °C); 0.09 g/100 mL (100 °C)
Solubility product (K_{sp})	6.5×10^{−7}
Solubility	soluble in dilute nitric acid, Insoluble in water, Soluble in hot sulfuric acid.
Magnetic susceptibility (χ)	−123.0·10^{−6} cm^{3}/mol

Structure
Coordination geometry	monoclinic

Thermochemistry
Heat capacity (C)	132 J mol^{−1} K^{−1}
Std molar entropy (S^{⦵}_{298})	200.7 J mol^{−1} K^{−1}
Std enthalpy of formation (Δ_{f}H^{⦵}_{298})	-743.1 kJ mol^{−1}

Related compounds
Other anions	Mercury(I) fluoride Mercury(I) chloride Mercury(I) bromide Mercury(I) iodide
Other cations	Mercury(II) sulfate Cadmium sulfate Thallium(I) sulfate
- Except where otherwise noted, data are given for materials in their standard state (at 25 °C [77 °F], 100 kPa). verify (what is ?) Infobox references

Mercury(I) sulfate, commonly called mercurous sulphate (UK) or mercurous sulfate (US) is the chemical compound Hg_{2}SO_{4}. Mercury(I) sulfate is a metallic compound that is a white, pale yellow or beige powder. It is a metallic salt of sulfuric acid formed by replacing both hydrogen atoms with mercury(I). It is highly toxic; it could be fatal if inhaled, ingested, or absorbed by skin.

== Structure ==
Simplified depiction of the structure of mercurous sulfate.

In the crystal, mercurous sulfate is made up of Hg_{2}^{2+} center with an Hg-Hg distance of about 2.50 Å (250 pm). The SO_{4}^{2−} anions form both long and short Hg-O bonds ranging from 2.23 to 2.93 Å (223 to 293 pm).

Focusing on the shorter Hg-O bonds, the Hg – Hg – O bond angle is 165°±1°.

== Preparation ==
One way to prepare mercury(I) sulfate is to mix the acidic solution of mercury(I) nitrate with 1 to 6 sulfuric acid solution:,

Hg_{2}(NO_{3})_{2} + H_{2}SO_{4} → Hg_{2}SO_{4} + 2 HNO_{3}

It can also be prepared by reacting an excess of mercury with concentrated sulfuric acid:

2 Hg + 2 H_{2}SO_{4} → Hg_{2}SO_{4} + 2 H_{2}O + SO_{2}

== Use in electrochemical cells ==
Mercury(I) sulfate is often used in electrochemical cells. It was first introduced in electrochemical cells by Latimer Clark in 1872, It was then alternatively used in Weston cells made by George Augustus Hulett in 1911. It has been found to be a good electrode at high temperatures above 100 °C along with silver sulfate.

Mercury(I) sulfate has been found to decompose at high temperatures. The decomposition process is endothermic, and it occurs between 335 °C and 500 °C.

Mercury(I) sulfate has unique properties that make the standard cells possible. It has a rather low solubility (about one gram per liter); diffusion from the cathode system is not excessive; and it is sufficient to give a large potential at a mercury electrode.
