= Mercury nitrate =

Mercury nitrate can refer to:

- Mercury(I) nitrate, Hg_{2}(NO_{3})_{2}
- Mercury(II) nitrate, Hg(NO_{3})_{2}
