= Lutetium(III) iodide =

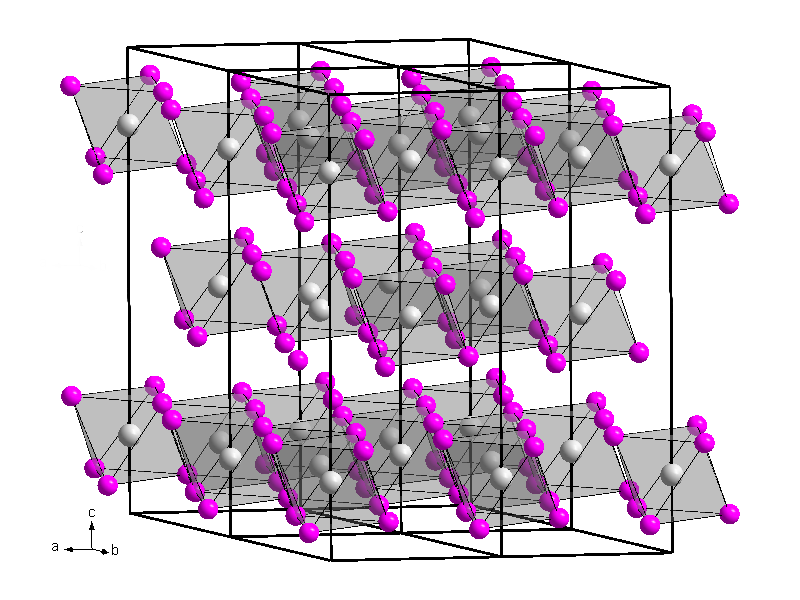

Names
- Other names Lutetium iodide Lutetium triiodide

Identifiers
| CAS Number | 13813-45-1 |
| 3D model (JSmol) | Interactive image |
| ChemSpider | 75574 |
| ECHA InfoCard | 100.034.054 |
| EC Number | 237-475-0 |
| PubChem CID | 83752 |
| CompTox Dashboard (EPA) | DTXSID5065649 |
- InChI: InChI=1S/3HI.Lu/h3*1H;/q;;;+3/p-3 Key: NZOCXFRGADJTKP-UHFFFAOYSA-K
- SMILES: I[Lu](I)I

Properties
| Chemical formula | LuI_{3} |
| Molar mass | 555.6802 g·mol^{−1} |
| Appearance | solid |
| Density | 5.60 g/cm^{−3} |
| Melting point | 1050 °C |
| Boiling point | 1210 °C |

Hazards
- GHS labelling
| Pictograms | (GHS07: Exclamation mark) |
| Signal word | Warning |
| Hazard statements | H315, H319, H335 |
| Precautionary statements | P261, P280, P304+P340, P305+P351+P338, P405, P501 |
- Except where otherwise noted, data are given for materials in their standard state (at 25 °C [77 °F], 100 kPa). Infobox references

Lutetium(III) iodide or lutetium iodide is an inorganic compound consisting of iodine and lutetium, with the chemical formula of LuI_{3}.

== Preparation ==
Lutetium(III) iodide can be obtained by reacting lutetium with iodine:

2 Lu + 3 I_{2} → 2 LuI_{3}

Lutetium(III) iodide can also obtained by the reacting metallic lutetium with mercury iodide in vacuum at 500 °C:

2 Lu + 3 HgI_{2} → 2 LuI_{3} + 3 Hg

The elemental mercury generated in the reaction can be removed by distillation.

The lutetium(III) iodide hydrate crystallized from the solution can be heated with ammonium iodide to obtain the anhydrate.

== Properties ==
It is a brown, very hygroscopic solid with a bismuth(III) iodide-type crystal structure. In air, it quickly absorbs moisture and forms hydrates. The corresponding oxide iodide is also readily formed at elevated temperature.

Lutetium(III) iodide doped with cerium is designed for use in PET scanners. Lutetium iodide can be used together with yttrium iodide and gadolinium iodide in LuI_{3}-YI_{3}-GdI_{3} scintillators to detect neutron and gamma radiation.
