= Mercury(II) chloride =

Toxic mercury compound known as 'corrosive sublimate'

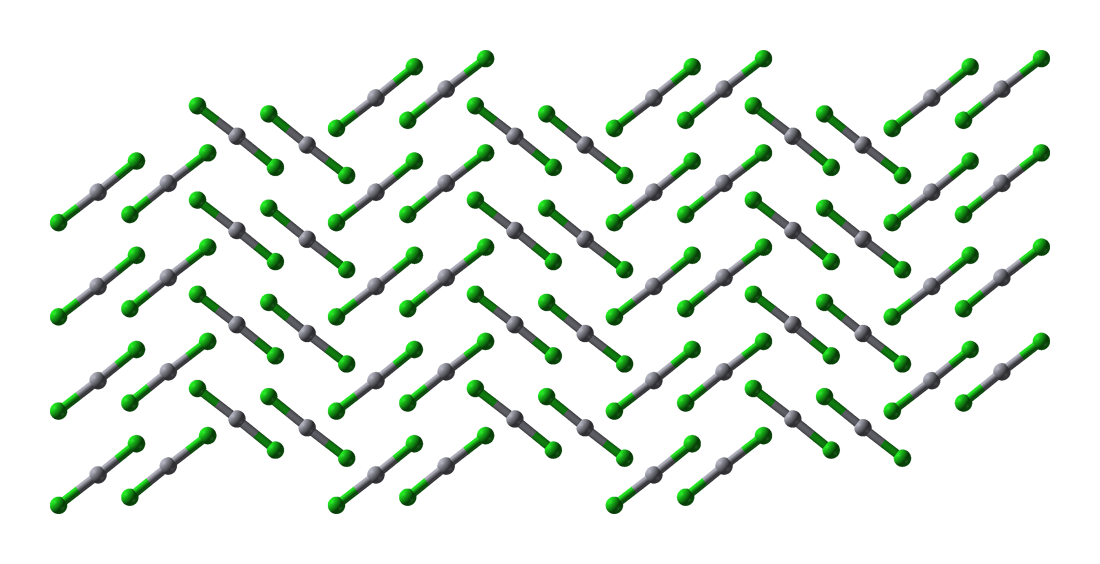
- Ball-and-stick model of the crystal structure

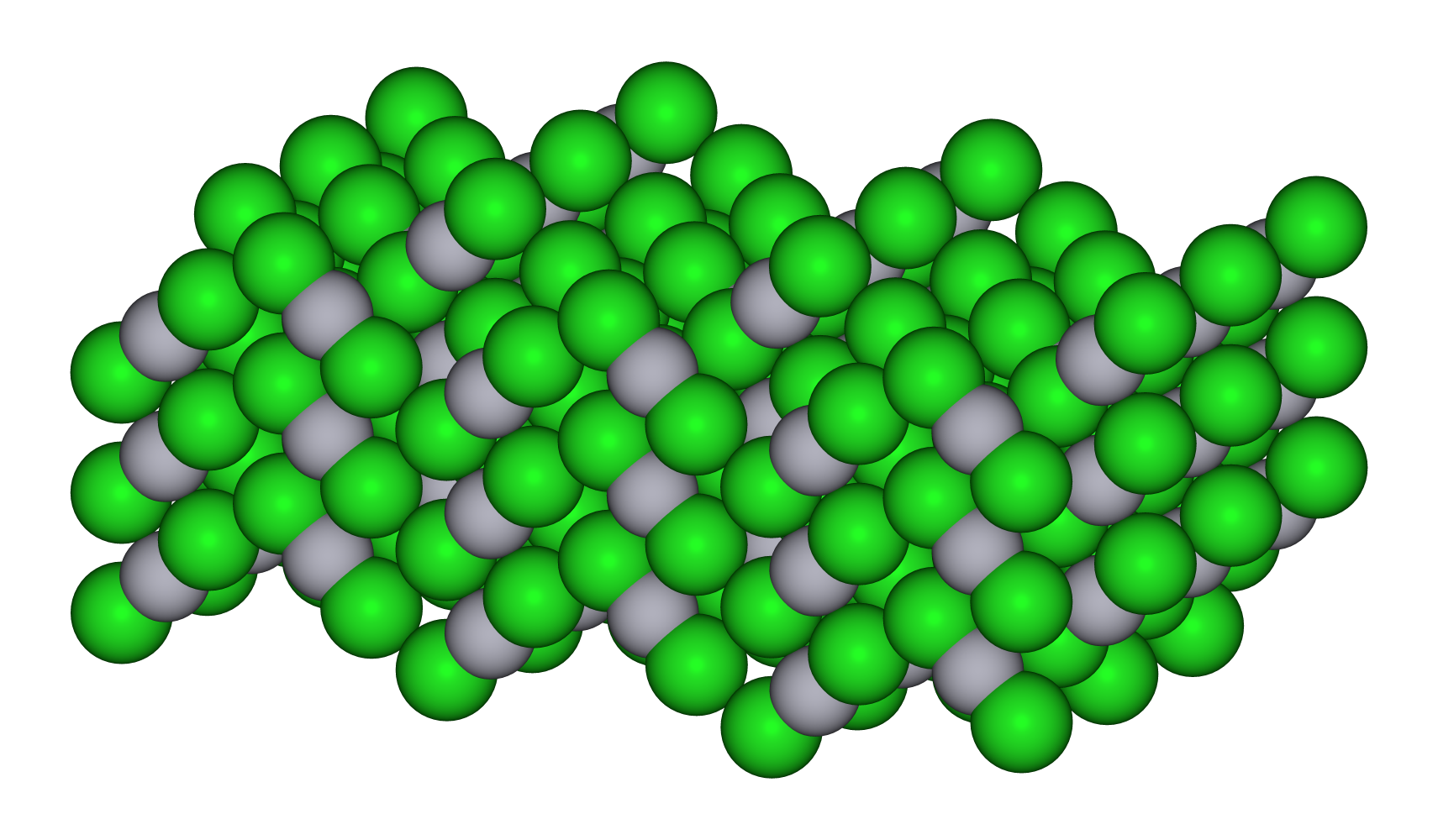
- Space-filling model of the crystal structure

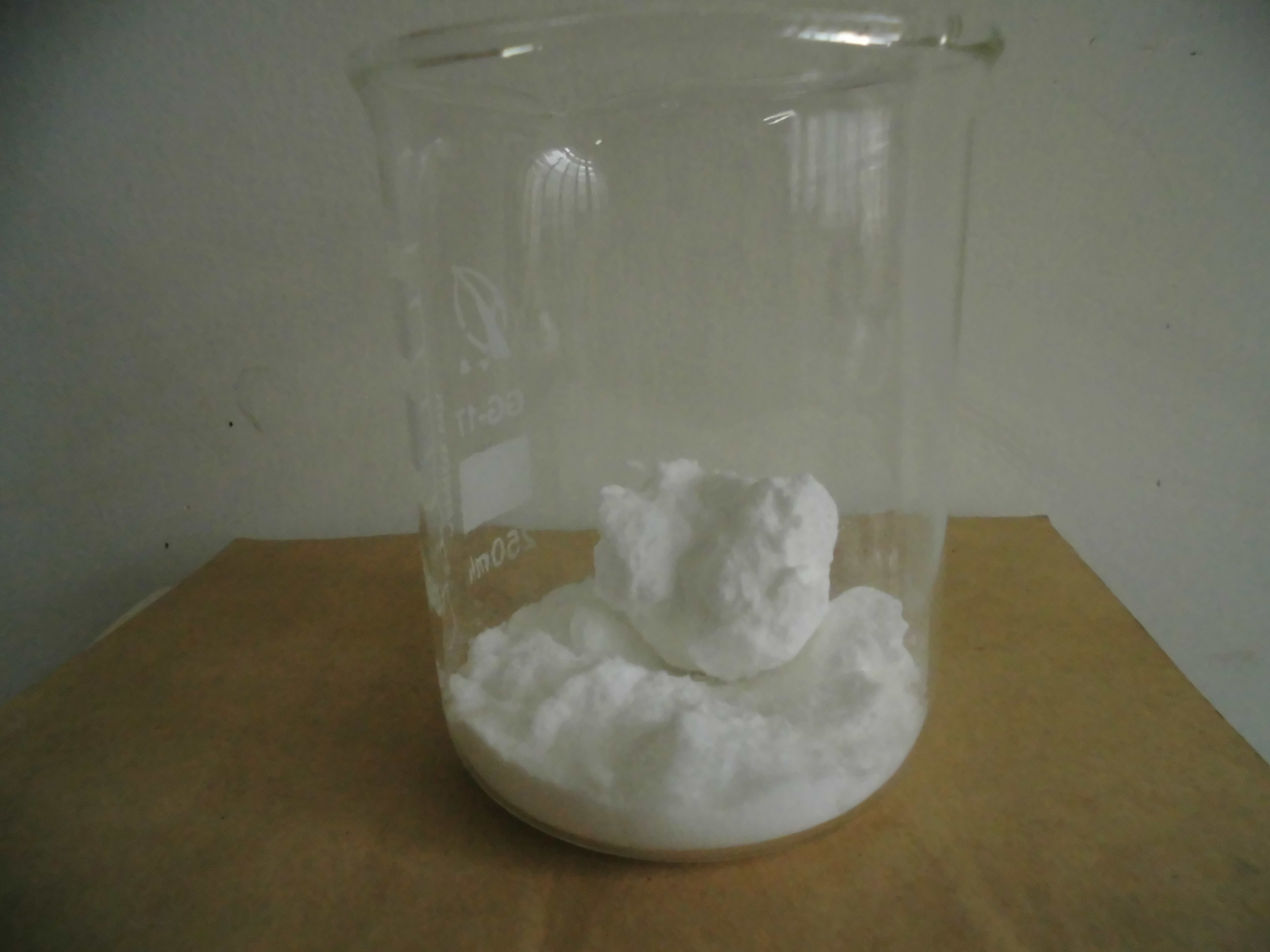

Names
- IUPAC names Mercury(II) chloride Mercury dichloride
- Other names Mercury bichloride Corrosive sublimate Abavit; Mercuric chloride Sulema (Russia); TL-898; Agrosan; Hydrargyri dichloridum (homeopathy)

Identifiers
CAS Number	7487-94-7
3D model (JSmol)	Interactive image
ChemSpider	22517
ECHA InfoCard	100.028.454
EC Number	231-299-8
KEGG	C13377
PubChem CID	24085
RTECS number	OV9100000
UNII	53GH7MZT1R
UN number	1624
CompTox Dashboard (EPA)	DTXSID5020811
- InChI: InChI=1S/2ClH.Hg/h2*1H;/q;;+2/p-2
- SMILES: Cl[Hg]Cl

Properties
Chemical formula	HgCl_{2}
Molar mass	271.52 g/mol
Appearance	colorless or white solid
Odor	odorless
Density	5.43 g/cm^{3}
Melting point	276 °C (529 °F; 549 K)
Boiling point	304 °C (579 °F; 577 K)
Solubility in water	3.6 g/100 mL (0 °C); 7.4 g/100 mL (20 °C); 48 g/100 mL (100 °C)
Solubility	4 g/100 mL (ether) soluble in alcohol, acetone, ethyl acetate slightly soluble in benzene, CS_{2}, pyridine
Acidity (pK_{a})	3.2 (0.2M solution)
Magnetic susceptibility (χ)	−82.0·10^{−6} cm^{3}/mol
Refractive index (n_{D})	1.859

Structure
Crystal structure	orthogonal
Coordination geometry	linear
Molecular shape	linear
Dipole moment	zero

Thermochemistry
Std molar entropy (S^{⦵}_{298})	144 J·mol^{−1}·K^{−1}
Std enthalpy of formation (Δ_{f}H^{⦵}_{298})	−230 kJ·mol^{−1}
Gibbs free energy (Δ_{f}G^{⦵})	−178.7 kJ/mol

Pharmacology
ATC code	D08AK03 (WHO)

Hazards
- Occupational safety and health (OHS/OSH)
Main hazards	Highly toxic, corrosive.
- GHS labelling
Pictograms	(GHS05: Corrosive) (GHS06: Toxic) (GHS08: Health hazard) (GHS09: Environmental hazard)
Signal word	Danger
Hazard statements	H300+H310+H330, H301, H314, H341, H361f, H372, H410
Precautionary statements	P201, P202, P260, P264, P270, P273, P280, P281, P301+P310, P301+P330+P331, P303+P361+P353, P304+P340, P305+P351+P338, P308+P313, P310, P314, P321, P330, P363, P391, P405, P501
NFPA 704 (fire diamond)	4 0 1
Flash point	Non-flammable
- Lethal dose or concentration (LD, LC)
LD_{50} (median dose)	32 mg/kg (rats, orally)
Safety data sheet (SDS)	ICSC 0979

Related compounds
Other anions	Mercury(II) fluoride Mercury(II) bromide Mercury(II) iodide
Other cations	Zinc chloride Cadmium chloride Mercury(I) chloride
- Except where otherwise noted, data are given for materials in their standard state (at 25 °C [77 °F], 100 kPa). verify (what is ?) Infobox references

Mercury(II) chloride (mercury bichloride, mercury dichloride, mercuric chloride), historically also sulema or corrosive sublimate, is the inorganic chemical compound of mercury and chlorine with the formula HgCl_{2}, used as a laboratory reagent. It is a white crystalline solid and a molecular compound that is very toxic to humans. Once used as a first line treatment for syphilis, it has been replaced by the more effective and less toxic procaine penicillin since at least 1948.

== Synthesis ==
Mercuric chloride is obtained by the action of chlorine on mercury or on mercury(I) chloride. It can also be produced by the addition of hydrochloric acid to a hot, concentrated solution of mercury(I) compounds such as the nitrate:

Hg_{2}(NO_{3})_{2} + 4 HCl → 2 HgCl_{2} + 2 H_{2}O + 2 NO_{2}

Heating a mixture of solid mercury(II) sulfate and sodium chloride also affords volatile HgCl_{2}, which can be separated by sublimation.

== Properties ==
Mercuric chloride is not a salt composed of discrete ions, but it is made of linear triatomic molecules, hence its tendency to sublime. In the crystal, each mercury atom is bonded to two chloride ligands with Hg–Cl distance of 2.38 Å; six other chlorides are more distant at 3.38 Å.

Its solubility in water increases from 6% at 20 °C (68 °F) to 36% at 100 °C (212 °F).

== Applications ==
The main application of mercuric chloride is as a catalyst for the conversion of acetylene to vinyl chloride, the precursor to polyvinyl chloride:

C_{2}H_{2} + HCl → CH_{2}=CHCl

For this application, the mercuric chloride is supported on carbon in concentrations of about 5 weight percent. This technology has been eclipsed by the thermal cracking of 1,2-dichloroethane. Other significant applications of mercuric chloride include its use as a depolarizer in batteries and as a reagent in organic synthesis and analytical chemistry (see below). It is being used in plant tissue culture for surface sterilisation of explants such as leaf or stem nodes.

=== As a chemical reagent ===
Mercuric chloride is occasionally used to form an amalgam with metals, such as aluminium. Upon treatment with an aqueous solution of mercuric chloride, aluminium strips quickly become covered by a thin layer of the amalgam. Normally, aluminium is protected by a thin layer of oxide, thus making it inert. Amalgamated aluminium exhibits a variety of reactions not observed for aluminium itself. For example, amalgamated aluminum reacts with water generating Al(OH)_{3} and hydrogen gas. Halocarbons react with amalgamated aluminium in the Barbier reaction. These alkylaluminium compounds are nucleophilic and can be used in a similar fashion to the Grignard reagent. Amalgamated aluminium is also used as a reducing agent in organic synthesis. Zinc is also commonly amalgamated using mercuric chloride.

Mercuric chloride is used to remove dithiane groups attached to a carbonyl in an umpolung reaction. This reaction exploits the high affinity of Hg^{2+} for anionic sulfur ligands.

Mercuric chloride may be used as a stabilising agent for chemicals and analytical samples. Care must be taken to ensure that detected mercuric chloride does not eclipse the signals of other components in the sample, such as is possible in gas chromatography.

== History ==
=== Discovery of the mineral acids ===
Around 900, the authors of the Arabic writings attributed to Jabir ibn Hayyan (Latin: Geber) and the Persian physician and alchemist Abu Bakr al-Razi (Latin: Rhazes) were experimenting with sal ammoniac (ammonium chloride), which when it was distilled together with vitriol (hydrated sulfates of various metals) produced hydrogen chloride. It is possible that in one of his experiments, al-Razi stumbled upon a primitive method to produce hydrochloric acid. However, it appears that in most of these early experiments with chloride salts, the gaseous products were discarded, and hydrogen chloride may have been produced many times before it was discovered that it can be put to chemical use.

One of the first such uses of hydrogen chloride was in the synthesis of mercury(II) chloride (corrosive sublimate), whose production from the heating of mercury either with alum and ammonium chloride or with vitriol and sodium chloride was first described in the De aluminibus et salibus ("On Alums and Salts"). This eleventh- or twelfth-century Arabic alchemical text is anonymous in most manuscripts, though some manuscripts attribute it to Hermes Trismegistus, and a few falsely attribute it to Abu Bakr al-Razi. It was translated into Hebrew and two times into Latin, with one Latin translation by Gerard of Cremona (1144–1187).

In the process described in the De aluminibus et salibus, hydrochloric acid started to form, but it immediately reacted with the mercury to produce mercury(II) chloride. Thirteenth-century Latin alchemists, for whom the De aluminibus et salibus was one of the main reference works, were fascinated by the chlorinating properties of mercury(II) chloride, and they eventually discovered that when the metals are eliminated from the process of heating vitriols, alums, and salts, strong mineral acids can directly be distilled.

=== Historical use in photography ===
Mercury(II) chloride was used as a photographic intensifier to produce positive pictures in the collodion process of the 1800s. When applied to a negative, the mercury(II) chloride whitens and thickens the image, thereby increasing the opacity of the shadows and creating the illusion of a positive image.

=== Historical use in preservation ===
For the preservation of anthropological and biological specimens during the late 19th and early 20th centuries, objects were dipped in or were painted with a "mercuric solution". This was done to prevent the specimens' destruction by moths, mites and mold. Objects in drawers were protected by scattering crystalline mercuric chloride over them. It finds minor use in tanning, and wood was preserved by kyanizing (soaking in mercuric chloride). Mercuric chloride was one of the three chemicals used for railroad tie wood treatment between 1830 and 1856 in Europe and the United States. Limited railroad ties were treated in the United States until there were concerns over lumber shortages in the 1890s. The process was generally abandoned because mercuric chloride was water-soluble and not effective for the long term, as well as being highly poisonous. Furthermore, alternative treatment processes, such as copper sulfate, zinc chloride, and ultimately creosote; were found to be less toxic. Limited kyanizing was used for some railroad ties in the 1890s and early 1900s.

=== Historic use in medicine ===
Mercuric chloride was a common over-the-counter disinfectant in the early twentieth century, recommended for everything from fighting measles germs to protecting fur coats and exterminating red ants. A New York physician, Carlin Philips, wrote in 1913 that "it is one of our most popular and effective household antiseptics", but so corrosive and poisonous that it should only be available by prescription. A group of physicians in Chicago made the same demand later the same month. The product frequently caused accidental poisonings and was used as a suicide method.

It was used by Arab physicians in the Middle Ages to disinfect wounds. It continued to be used by Arab physicians into the twentieth century, until modern medicine deemed it unsafe for use.

Syphilis was frequently treated with mercuric chloride before the advent of antibiotics. It was inhaled, ingested, injected, and applied topically. Both mercuric-chloride treatment for syphilis and poisoning during the course of treatment were so common that the latter's symptoms were often confused with those of syphilis. This use of "salts of white mercury" is referred to in the English-language folk song "The Unfortunate Rake".

Yaws was treated with mercuric chloride (labeled as Corrosive Sublimate) before the advent of antibiotics. It was applied topically to alleviate ulcerative symptoms. Evidence of this is found in Jack London's book The Cruise of the Snark in the chapter entitled "The Amateur M.D."

Between 1901 and 1904 the US Marine Hospital Service quarantined and engaged in an extensive disinfection program of San Francisco's Chinatown in response to an epidemic of bubonic plague. This program forced the closure of over 14,000 rooms and the eviction of thousands of Chinese residents whose dwellings were rendered toxic and uninhabitable from the disinfection program. Long-term mercury pollution is a concern for construction workers in Chinatown to this day.

=== Historic use in crime and accidental poisonings ===
- In 1613, whilst imprisoned in the Tower of London, Thomas Overbury was poisoned with an enema of mercury sublimate. The following trial saw the downfall of the murderers, Robert Carr and his wife, Frances.
- In Volume V of Alexandre Dumas' Celebrated Crimes, he recounts the history of Antoine François Desrues, who killed noblewoman Madame de Lamotte with "corrosive sublimate."
- In 1906 in New York, Richard Tilghman died after mistaking bichloride of mercury tablets for lithium citrate.
- Actor Lon Chaney's estranged wife Cleva attempted suicide by swallowing mercuric chloride in 1913. Although the attempt failed, the toxic effects ruined her singing career.
- In a highly publicized case in 1920, mercury bichloride was reported to have caused the death of 25-year-old American silent film star Olive Thomas. While vacationing in France, she accidentally ingested the compound, which had been prescribed to her husband Jack Pickford in liquid topical form to treat his syphilis. Contemporary press speculation was that she drank the poison intentionally, but there is no good evidence for this. Thomas died five days later.
- Mercuric chloride was used by Madge Oberholtzer to commit suicide after she was kidnapped, raped and tortured by Ku Klux Klan leader D.C. Stephenson. She died from a combination of mercury poisoning and the staph infection that she suffered when Stephenson bit her during the assault.
- Ana María Cires, a young wife of Uruguayan writer Horacio Quiroga, committed suicide by poison. After a violent fight with Quiroga, she ingested a fatal dose of "sublimado", or mercury chloride. She endured great agony for eight days before dying on December 14, 1915.
- Ruth L. Truffant's death was called a suicide after she died from bichloride of mercury poisoning on 26 April 1914.

== Toxicity ==
Mercury dichloride is a highly toxic compound, both acutely and as a cumulative poison. Its toxicity is due not just to its mercury content but also to its corrosive properties, which can cause serious internal damage, including ulcers to the stomach, mouth, and throat, and corrosive damage to the intestines. Mercuric chloride also tends to accumulate in the kidneys, causing severe corrosive damage which can lead to acute kidney failure. However, mercuric chloride, like all inorganic mercury salts, does not cross the blood–brain barrier as readily as organic mercury, although it is known to be a cumulative poison.

Common side effects of acute mercuric chloride poisoning include burning sensations in the mouth and throat, stomach pain, abdominal discomfort, lethargy, vomiting of blood, corrosive bronchitis, severe irritation to the gastrointestinal tract, and kidney failure. Chronic exposure can lead to symptoms more common with mercury poisoning, such as insomnia, delayed reflexes, excessive salivation, bleeding gums, fatigue, tremors, and dental problems.

Acute exposure to large amounts of mercuric chloride can cause death in as little as 24 hours, usually due to acute kidney failure or damage to the gastrointestinal tract. In other cases, victims of acute exposure have taken up to two weeks to die.
