= Mercury sulfate =

Mercury sulfate may refer to:

- Mercury(I) sulfate (mercurous sulfate), Hg_{2}SO_{4}
- Mercury(II) sulfate (mercuric sulfate), HgSO_{4} and its hydrate
