= Mercury bromide =

Mercury bromide can refer to:

- Mercury(I) bromide (mercurous bromide), Hg_{2}Br_{2}
- Mercury(II) bromide (mercuric bromide), HgBr_{2}
