= Mercury(II) nitrate =

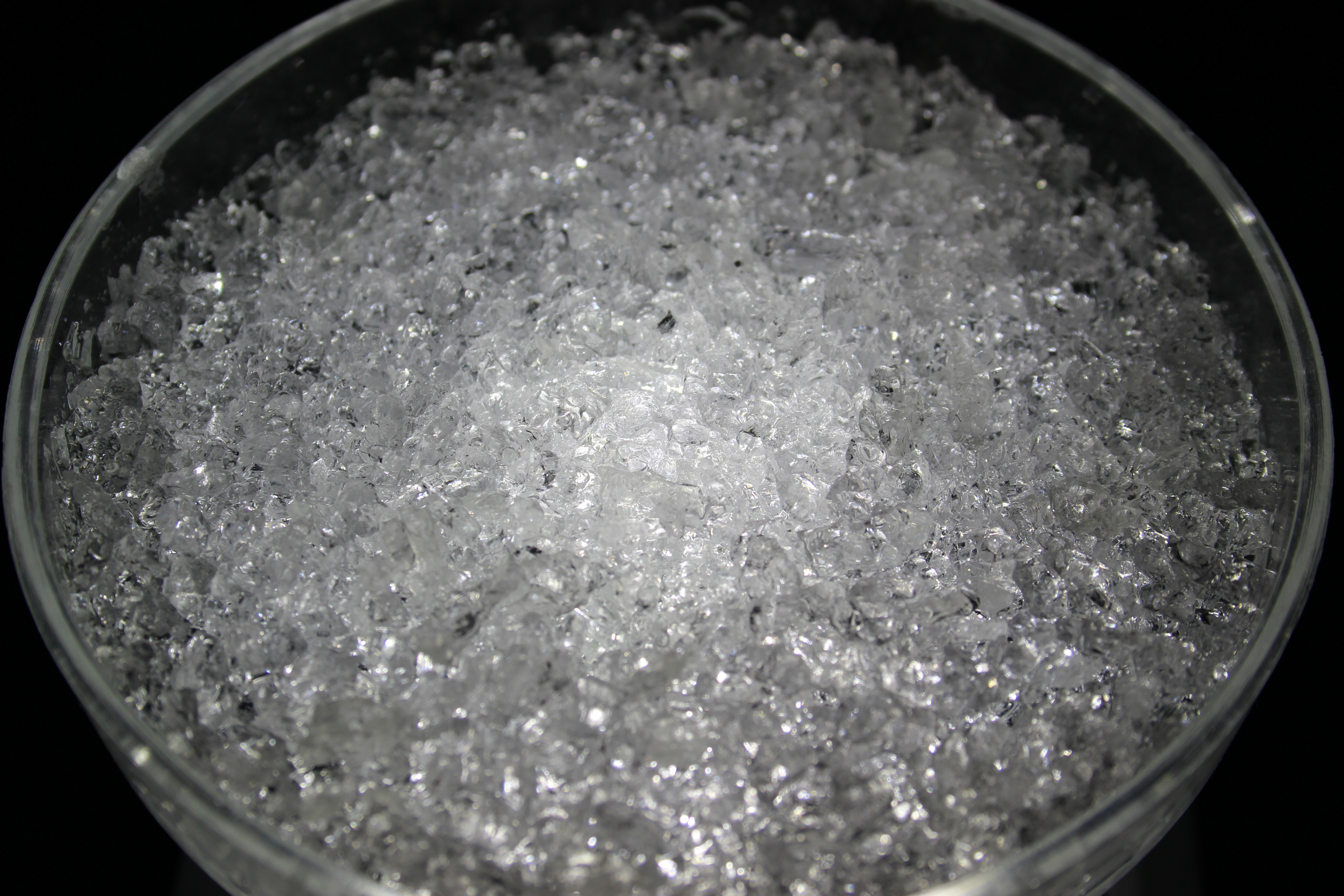
- 'monohydrate'

Names
- IUPAC names Mercury dinitrate Mercury(II) nitrate
- Other names Mercuric nitrate

Identifiers
CAS Number	10045-94-0; 7783-34-8 (monohydrate)
3D model (JSmol)	Interactive image
ChemSpider	23247
ECHA InfoCard	100.030.126
EC Number	233-152-3
PubChem CID	16683796
RTECS number	OW8225000
UNII	2FMV9338BW
UN number	1625
CompTox Dashboard (EPA)	DTXSID9044162
- InChI: InChI=1S/Hg.2NO3/c;2*2-1(3)4/q+2;2*-1 Key: ORMNPSYMZOGSSV-UHFFFAOYSA-N; InChI=1/Hg.2NO3/c;2*2-1(3)4/q+2;2*-1 Key: ORMNPSYMZOGSSV-UHFFFAOYAS
- SMILES: [N+](=O)([O-])[O-].[N+](=O)([O-])[O-].[Hg+2]

Properties
Chemical formula	Hg(NO_{3})_{2}
Molar mass	324.60 g·mol^{-1} (anhydrous)
Appearance	colorless crystals or white powder
Odor	sharp
Density	4.3 g/cm^{3} (monohydrate)
Melting point	79 °C (174 °F; 352 K) (monohydrate)
Solubility in water	soluble
Solubility	soluble in nitric acid, acetone, ammonia insoluble in ethanol
Magnetic susceptibility (χ)	−74.0·10^{−6} cm^{3}/mol

Hazards
- GHS labelling
Pictograms	(GHS03: Oxidizing) (GHS06: Toxic) (GHS08: Health hazard) (GHS09: Environmental hazard)
Signal word	Danger
Hazard statements	H272, H300, H310, H330, H373, H410
NFPA 704 (fire diamond)	3 0 1 OX
Flash point	Nonflammable
Safety data sheet (SDS)	ICSC 0980

Related compounds
Other anions	Mercury(II) sulfate Mercury(II) chloride
Other cations	Zinc nitrate Cadmium nitrate
Related compounds	Mercury(I) nitrate
- Except where otherwise noted, data are given for materials in their standard state (at 25 °C [77 °F], 100 kPa). verify (what is ?) Infobox references

Mercury(II) nitrate is an inorganic compound with the chemical formula Hg(NO_{3})_{2}. It is the mercury(II) salt of nitric acid HNO_{3}. No evidence for any neutral mercury(II) nitrate has been reported. Commonly used and commercially available 'mercury(II) nitrate monohydrate' is actually a basic mercury nitrate with the formula Hg(NO_{3})OH·nH_{2}O. All mercury(II) nitrate salts are colorless or white soluble crystalline solids that are occasionally used as reagents in organic synthesis.

== Synthesis ==
Hg(NO_{3})OH is made by treating mercury or mercury(II) oxide with hot concentrated nitric acid. Hydrated analogues can be produced by the recrystallization of Hg(NO_{3})OH in water.

Neither the neutral anhydrous nor the monohydrate has been confirmed by X-ray crystallography.

== Uses ==
Mercury(II) nitrate is used as an oxidizing agent in organic synthesis, as a nitrification agent, as an analytical reagent in laboratories, in the manufacture of felt, and in the manufacture of mercury fulminate. An alternative qualitative Zeisel test can be done with the use of mercury(II) nitrate instead of silver nitrate, leading to the formation of scarlet red mercury(II) iodide.

== Health information ==
Mercury compounds are highly toxic. The use of this compound by hatters and the subsequent mercury poisoning of said hatters is a common theory of where the phrase "mad as a hatter" came from.

== See also ==
- Mercury
- The Hatter
- Mercury poisoning
- Gilding
