= Denigés' reagent =

The Denigés' reagent is a reagent used for qualitative analysis. It was developed in 1898 by Georges Denigés (December 25, 1859–February 20, 1951), a French biochemist.

== Uses ==
Denigés' reagent is used to detect isolefin or tertiary alcohols which can be easily dehydrated to form isoolefin in the presence of acid. Treatment of solutions containing either isolefin or tertiary alcohols with this reagent will result in the formation of a solid yellow or red precipitate.

== Synthesis ==
Despite the different stoichiometry in these mixtures which varies the concentration of the reagent, they all follow the same idea of adding HgO to distilled water and concentrated sulfuric acid. The Denigés' reagent is ultimately mercury(II) sulfate in an aqueous solution.

- 5 grams of mercury(II) oxide (HgO) is dissolved in 40 mL of distilled water. The mixture is slowly stirred, while 20 mL of concentrated sulfuric acid is added. After adding another 40 mL of distilled water, the solution is stirred until the HgO is completely dissolved.
- The Denigés' reagent can also be prepared by dissolving 5 grams of HgO in 20 mL of concentrated sulfuric acid and 100 mL of distilled water.
- The Denigés' reagent can be modified by using nitric acid in place of sulfuric acid

== Health issues ==
Inhalation of the Denigés' reagent can result in acute poisoning: causing tightness in the chest, difficulties breathing, coughing and pain. Exposure of mercury sulfate to the eyes can cause ulceration of conjunctiva and cornea. If mercury sulfate is exposed to the skin it may cause sensitization dermatitis. Lastly, ingestion of mercury sulfate will cause necrosis, pain, vomiting, and severe purging. Ingestion can result in death within a few hours due to peripheral vascular collapse.
