= Ruth L. Trufant =

American actress (1886–1914)

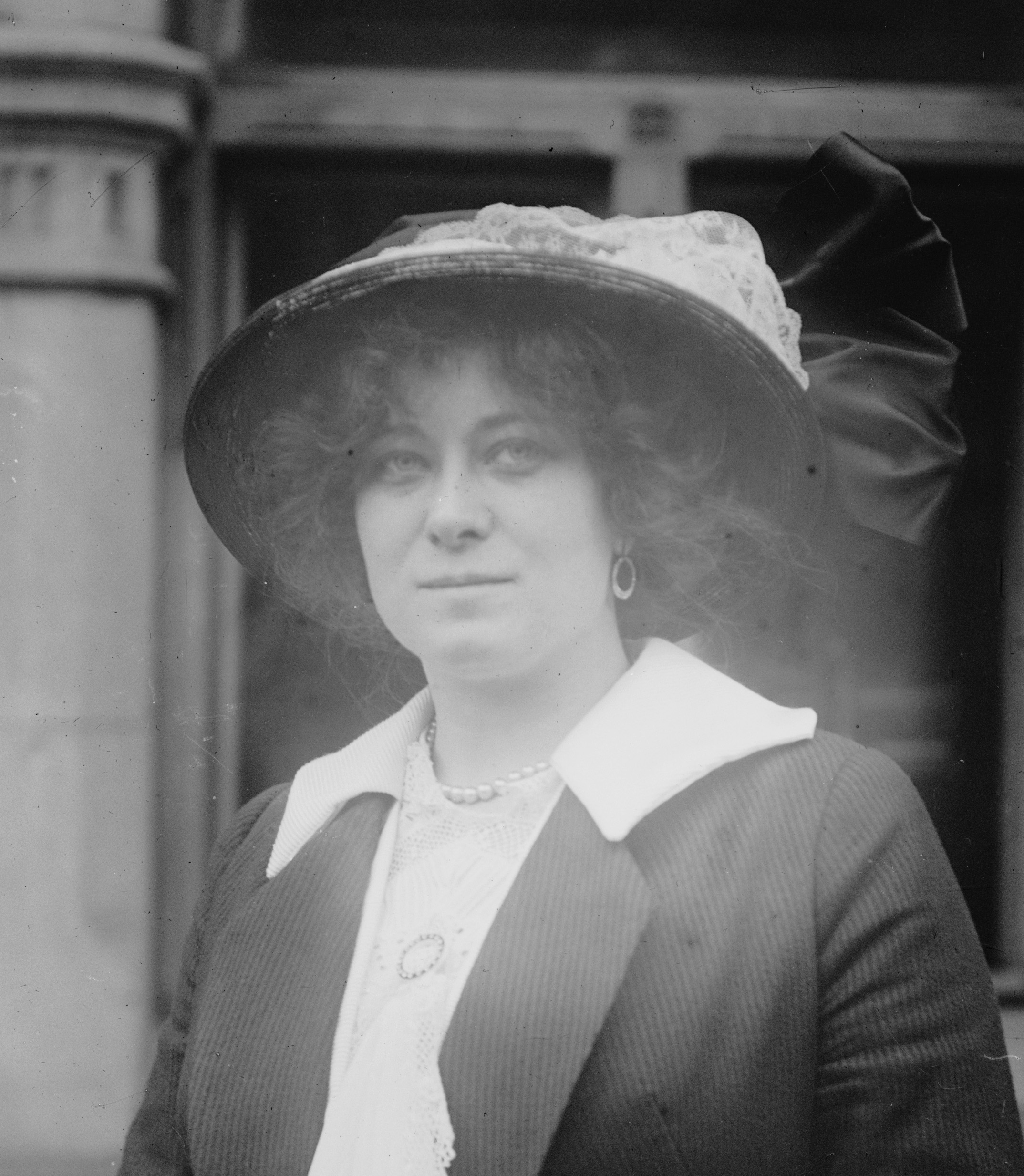
- Trufant c. 1910
- Born: Ruth Lucille Stuart; 1886
- Died: April 26, 1914 (aged 27–28); New York City, US
- Other names: Maida Athens
- Occupation: Actress
- Years active: 1904
- Spouse: William Trufant (m. 1902; div. 1903)

Ruth Lucille Trufant (née Stuart; 1886 – April 26, 1914) was an American actress and an aspiring opera singer. She was also known by her stage name Maida Athens. She is known for a lawsuit she filed against a married suitor for breach of promise. She died of bichloride of mercury poisoning shortly after she lost the lawsuit in 1914.

== Early life ==
Ruth Lucille Trufant's father was Judge T. B. Stuart of Denver. In 1902, at 16 years old, she attended school in Chicago. She eloped with businessman William Trufant because her parents did not approve of the marriage. The marriage only lasted one year, and she was divorced in 1903. At 17 years old she moved to New York to pursue acting, where she met a hotelman named Henry G. Williams, who was older than 50 at the time. Williams then began a relationship with Trufant.

== Career ==
When Trufant was 17 years old she was an understudy to the leading lady, Miss Fischer, for the play The Tattooed Man. In 1904 she appeared in the plays Babes in Toyland and It Happened in Nordland as part of the supporting cast. In 1912 she was a music teacher.

== Court case ==
Trufant alleged that Williams had proposed to her on Christmas Day of 1904, asking her to give up her career to be his wife, which she obliged to do. She claimed he continually postponed the wedding with various excuses until May 1907. At this point, she set out for Italy to study opera singing. Williams chased her to Paris and begged her to return to the United States, again promising to marry her. By 1911, Williams finally told her that he had been deceiving her and he could not marry her because he was already married.

In 1912, Trufant sued Williams, and The Philadelphia Inquirer ran the headline "Singer Asks $50,000 Balm For Her Heart". In her lawsuit she claimed that one of Williams promises was that he would give her $50,000 for her use once they were married. On April 26, 1913, the story was widely reported, The Atchison Daily Globe took pity on her with a column calling her "trusting and shy", and an "innocent little thing". On April 28, The Evansville Journal's headline read "Her Eyes were Worth $50,000". They also printed a large photo of Trufant and a closeup of her eyes with the statement, "The potent appeal of Mrs. Ruth Trufant's eyes were such that they entranced Henry G. Williams". On April 30, The Buffalo Enquirer reported that she lost her $50,000 lawsuit (equivalent to $1,590,741 in 2024) against Williams.

She appealed her loss in the breach of promise lawsuit against Williams. In early April 1914 she was given the news that her appeal was denied.

== Death ==
Trufant succumbed to the effects of bichloride of mercury poisoning on April 26, 1914. Her death was ruled a suicide. The Pittsburgh Daily Post reported that she took the poison one week after losing her appeal in the breach of promise suit against Williams. She was admitted to the Red Cross hospital (now part of the New York University Grossman School of Medicine) and survived for one week.
