= Formula unit =

Chemical formula of a unit of an ionic compound or covalent network solid

In chemistry, a formula unit is the smallest unit of a non-molecular substance, such as an ionic compound, covalent network solid, or metal. It can also refer to the chemical formula for that unit. Those structures do not consist of discrete molecules, and so for them, the term formula unit is used. In contrast, the terms molecule or molecular formula are applied to molecules. The formula unit is used as an independent entity for stoichiometric calculations. Examples of formula units, include ionic compounds such as NaCl and K_{2}O and covalent networks such as SiO_{2} and C (as diamond or graphite).

In most cases the formula representing a formula unit will also be an empirical formula, such as calcium carbonate (CaCO_{3}) or sodium chloride (NaCl), but it is not always the case. For example, the ionic compounds potassium persulfate (K_{2}S_{2}O_{8}), mercury(I) nitrate Hg_{2}(NO_{3})_{2}, and sodium peroxide Na_{2}O_{2}, have empirical formulas of KSO_{4}, HgNO_{3}, and NaO, respectively, being presented in the simplest whole number ratios.

In mineralogy, as minerals are almost exclusively either ionic or network solids, the formula unit is used. The number of formula units (Z) and the dimensions of the crystallographic axes are used in defining the unit cell.
