= Mercury(I) chloride =

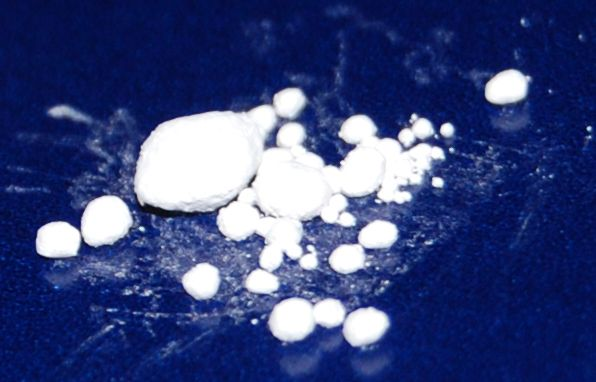

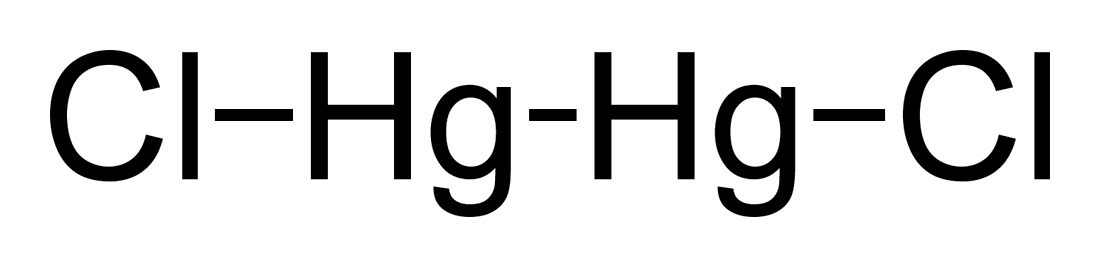

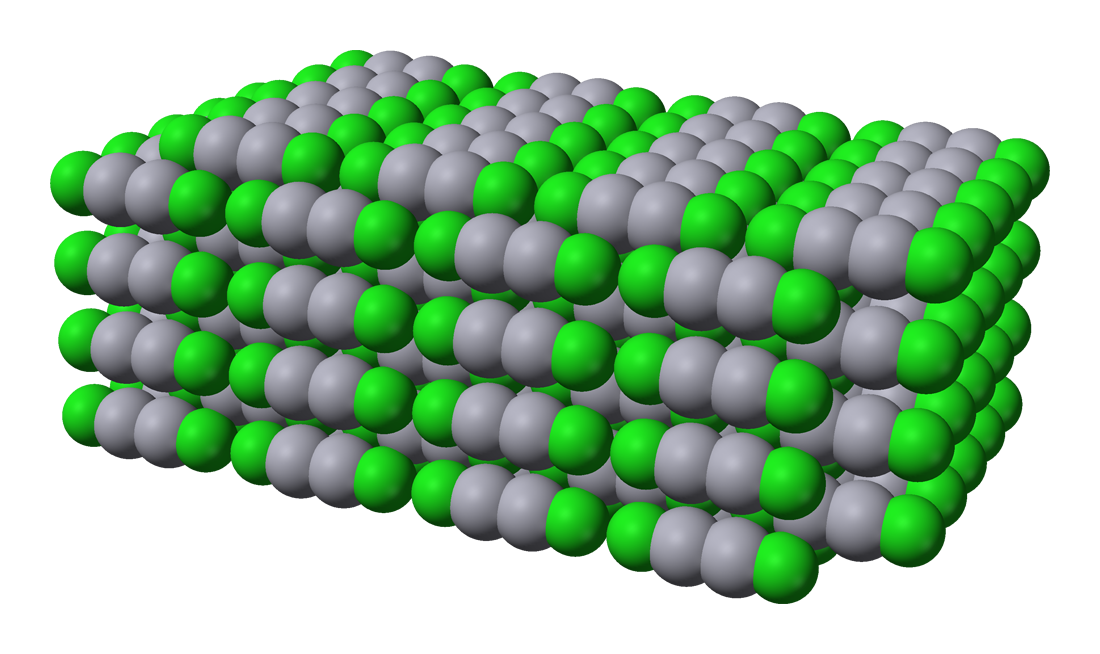

Names
- IUPAC name Dimercury dichloride
- Other names Mercury(I) chloride Mercurous chloride Calomel

Identifiers
CAS Number	10112-91-1
3D model (JSmol)	Interactive image
ChEBI	CHEBI:33050
ChemSpider	16740467
ECHA InfoCard	100.030.266
EC Number	233-307-5
Gmelin Reference	25976
PubChem CID	24956
RTECS number	OV8750000
UNII	J2D46N657D
UN number	3077
CompTox Dashboard (EPA)	DTXSID6044351
- InChI: InChI=1S/2ClH.2Hg/h2*1H;;/q;;2*+1/p-2 Key: ZOMNIUBKTOKEHS-UHFFFAOYSA-L
- SMILES: Cl[Hg][Hg]Cl

Properties
Chemical formula	Hg_{2}Cl_{2}
Molar mass	472.09 g/mol
Appearance	White solid
Density	7.150 g/cm^{3}
Melting point	383 °C (721 °F; 656 K) (sublimes)
Solubility in water	0.2 mg/100 mL
Solubility product (K_{sp})	1.43×10^{−18}
Solubility	insoluble in ethanol, ether
Magnetic susceptibility (χ)	−26.0·10^{−6} cm^{3}/mol
Refractive index (n_{D})	1.973

Structure
Crystal structure	tetragonal

Thermochemistry
Std molar entropy (S^{⦵}_{298})	196 J mol^{−1} K^{−1}
Std enthalpy of formation (Δ_{f}H^{⦵}_{298})	−265 kJ·mol^{−1}

Hazards
- GHS labelling
Pictograms	(GHS07: Exclamation mark) (GHS09: Environmental hazard)
Signal word	Warning
Hazard statements	H302, H315, H319, H335, H410
Precautionary statements	P261, P264, P270, P271, P273, P280, P301+P312, P302+P352, P304+P340, P305+P351+P338, P312, P321, P330, P332+P313, P337+P313, P362, P391, P403+P233, P405, P501
NFPA 704 (fire diamond)	3 0 0
Flash point	Non-flammable
- Lethal dose or concentration (LD, LC)
LD_{50} (median dose)	210 mg/kg (rat, oral)
Safety data sheet (SDS)	ICSC 0984

Related compounds
Other anions	Mercury(I) fluoride Mercury(I) bromide Mercury(I) iodide
Related compounds	Mercury(II) chloride
- Except where otherwise noted, data are given for materials in their standard state (at 25 °C [77 °F], 100 kPa). verify (what is ?) Infobox references

Mercury(I) chloride is the chemical compound with the formula Hg_{2}Cl_{2}. Also known as the mineral calomel (a rare mineral) or mercurous chloride, this dense white or yellowish-white, odorless solid is the principal example of a mercury(I) compound. It is a component of reference electrodes in electrochemistry.

== History ==
The name calomel is thought to come from the Greek καλός "beautiful", and μέλας "black"; or καλός and μέλι "honey" from its sweet taste. The "black" name is due to its characteristic disproportionation reaction with ammonia, which gives a spectacular black coloration due to the finely dispersed metallic mercury formed. It is also referred to as the mineral horn quicksilver or horn mercury.

Calomel was taken internally and used as a laxative, for example to treat George III in 1801, and disinfectant, as well as in the treatment of syphilis, until the early 20th century. Until 1971, it was also used as a horticultural fungicide, most notably as a root dip to help prevent the occurrence of clubroot amongst crops of the family Brassicaceae.

Mercury became a popular remedy for a variety of physical and mental ailments during the age of "heroic medicine". It was prescribed by doctors in America throughout the 18th century, and during the revolution, to make patients regurgitate and release their body from "impurities". Benjamin Rush was a well-known advocate of mercury in medicine and used calomel to treat sufferers of yellow fever during its outbreak in Philadelphia in 1793. Calomel was given to patients as a purgative or cathartic until they began to salivate and was often administered to patients in such great quantities that their hair and teeth fell out.

Yellow fever was also treated with calomel.

Lewis and Clark brought calomel on their expedition. Researchers used that same mercury, found deep in latrine pits, to retrace the locations of their respective locations and campsites.

== Properties ==
Mercury is unique among the group 12 metals for its ability to form the M–M bond so readily. Hg_{2}Cl_{2} is a linear molecule. The mineral calomel crystallizes in the tetragonal system, with space group I4/m 2/m 2/m. The unit cell of the crystal structure is shown below:

Ball-and-stick model of calomel's unit cell	Ball-and-stick model of the distorted octahedral coordination of mercury in calomel
unit cell	distorted octahedral coordination of Hg

The Hg–Hg bond length of 253 pm (Hg–Hg in the metal is 300 pm) and the Hg–Cl bond length in the linear Hg_{2}Cl_{2} unit is 243 pm. The overall coordination of each Hg atom is octahedral as, in addition to the two nearest neighbours, there are four other Cl atoms at 321 pm. Longer mercury polycations exist.

== Preparation and reactions ==
Mercurous chloride forms by the reaction of elemental mercury and mercuric chloride:

Hg + HgCl_{2} → Hg_{2}Cl_{2}

It can be prepared via metathesis reaction involving aqueous mercury(I) nitrate using various chloride sources including NaCl or HCl.

2 HCl + Hg_{2}(NO_{3})_{2} → Hg_{2}Cl_{2} + 2 HNO_{3}

Ammonia causes Hg_{2}Cl_{2} to disproportionate:

Hg_{2}Cl_{2} + 2 NH_{3} → Hg + Hg(NH_{2})Cl + NH_{4}Cl

=== Calomel electrode ===
Mercurous chloride is employed extensively in electrochemistry, taking advantage of the ease of its oxidation and reduction reactions. The calomel electrode is a reference electrode, especially in older publications. Over the past 50 years, it has been superseded by the silver/silver chloride (Ag/AgCl) electrode. Although the mercury electrodes have been widely abandoned due to the dangerous nature of mercury, many chemists believe they are still more accurate and are not dangerous as long as they are handled properly. The differences in experimental potentials vary little from literature values. Other electrodes can vary by 70 to 100 millivolts.

=== Photochemistry ===
Mercurous chloride decomposes into mercury(II) chloride and elemental mercury upon exposure to UV light.

Hg_{2}Cl_{2} → HgCl_{2} + Hg

The formation of Hg can be used to calculate the number of photons in the light beam, by the technique of actinometry.

By utilizing a light reaction in the presence of mercury(II) chloride and ammonium oxalate, mercury(I) chloride, ammonium chloride and carbon dioxide are produced.

2 HgCl_{2} + (NH_{4})_{2}C_{2}O_{4} Hg_{2}Cl_{2} + 2 NH_{4}^{+}Cl^{−} + 2 CO_{2}

This particular reaction was discovered by J. M. Eder (hence the name Eder reaction) in 1880 and reinvestigated by W. E. Rosevaere in 1929.

== Related mercury(I) compounds ==
Mercury(I) bromide, Hg_{2}Br_{2}, is light yellow, whereas mercury(I) iodide, Hg_{2}I_{2}, is greenish in colour. Both are poorly soluble. Mercury(I) fluoride is unstable in the absence of a strong acid.

== Safety considerations ==
Mercurous chloride is toxic, although due to its low solubility in water it is generally less dangerous than its mercuric chloride counterpart. It was used in medicine as a diuretic and purgative (laxative) in the United States from the late 1700s through the 1860s. Calomel was also a common ingredient in teething powders in Britain up until 1954, causing widespread mercury poisoning in the form of pink disease, which at the time had a mortality rate of 1 in 10. These medicinal uses were later discontinued when the compound's toxicity was discovered.

It has also found uses in cosmetics as soaps and skin lightening creams, but these preparations are now illegal to manufacture or import in many countries including the US, Canada, Japan and the European Union. A study of workers involved in the production of these preparations showed that the sodium salt of 2,3-dimercapto-1-propanesulfonic acid (DMPS) was effective in lowering the body burden of mercury and in decreasing the urinary mercury concentration to normal levels.
