= Potassium arsenite =

Identifiers
CAS Number	ortho: 36267-15-9
3D model (JSmol)	meta: Interactive image; ortho: Interactive image
ChemSpider	meta: 55524; ortho: 132377
ECHA InfoCard	100.033.332
EC Number	ortho: 236-680-2
PubChem CID	meta: 61616; ortho: 150167
UNII	meta: HQE48MPP30; ortho: K2P7R33YLY
CompTox Dashboard (EPA)	meta: DTXSID10274159
- InChI: InChI=1S/AsHO2.K/c2-1-3;/h(H,2,3);/q;+1/p-1 Key: HEQWEGCSZXMIJQ-UHFFFAOYSA-M; ortho: InChI=1S/AsO3.3K/c2-1(3)4;;;/q-3;3*+1 Key: OZYUYLWHROWIFJ-UHFFFAOYSA-N
- SMILES: meta: [O-][As]=O.[K+]; ortho: [K+].[K+].[K+].[O-][As]([O-])[O-]

Properties
Chemical formula	AsKO_{2}
Molar mass	146.019 g/mol
Appearance	white hygroscopic powder
Density	8.76 g/cm^{3}
Melting point	~ 300 °C (572 °F; 573 K) (decomposes)
Solubility in water	slightly soluble

Hazards
- Lethal dose or concentration (LD, LC)
LD_{50} (median dose)	14 mg/kg (oral, rat)
- NIOSH (US health exposure limits)
PEL (Permissible)	[1910.1018] TWA 0.010 mg/m^{3}
REL (Recommended)	Ca C 0.002 mg/m^{3} [15-minute]
IDLH (Immediate danger)	Ca [5 mg/m^{3} (as As)]
- Except where otherwise noted, data are given for materials in their standard state (at 25 °C [77 °F], 100 kPa). verify (what is ?) Infobox references

Potassium arsenite (KAsO_{2}) is an inorganic compound that exists in two forms, potassium meta-arsenite (KAsO_{2}) and potassium ortho-arsenite (K_{3}AsO_{3}). It is composed of arsenite ions (AsO^{3−}_{3} or AsO^{−}_{2}) with arsenic always existing in the +3 oxidation state. Like many other arsenic containing compounds, potassium arsenite is highly toxic and carcinogenic to humans. Potassium arsenite forms the basis of Fowler’s solution, which was historically used as a medicinal tonic, but was removed from market due to serious adverse effects. Potassium arsenite is still, however, used as a rodenticide.

== Properties ==
Potassium arsenite is an inorganic salt that exists as an odorless white solid. It is largely soluble in water and only slightly soluble in alcohol. Solutions of potassium arsenite contain moderate concentrations of hydroxide, and are thus slightly basic. While potassium arsenite is noncombustible, heating it results in its decomposition and the formation of toxic fumes that include arsine, arsenic oxides, and potassium oxides. Potassium arsenite also reacts with acids to yield toxic arsine gas.

The structure was determined by X-ray crystallography. As found for related As(III) compounds, the arsenic is pyramidal. The [AsO_{3}]^{−} subunits are connected by two bridging oxides.

== Preparation ==
Aqueous potassium arsenite, more commonly known as Fowler’s solution, can be prepared by heating arsenic trioxide (As_{2}O_{3}) with potassium hydroxide (KOH) in the presence of water. The reaction is shown below

As_{2}O_{3} (aq) + 2 KOH (aq) → 2 KAsO_{2} (aq) + H_{2}O

== Uses ==
In the eighteenth century English physician Thomas Fowler (1736–1801) utilized potassium arsenite to remedy a number of conditions including anemia, rheumatism, psoriasis, eczema, dermatitis, asthma, cholera, and syphilis. Furthermore, in 1865 the potential uses of potassium arsenite expanded as Fowler’s solution was used as the first chemotherapeutic agent to treat leukemia, however the effects were only temporary. Surprisingly enough, this specific use was inspired by potassium arsenite’s role in improving digestion and producing a smoother coat in horses. Potassium arsenite is also a key inorganic component of certain wood preservatives, rodenticides, insecticides, and herbicides.

== Health effects ==
The toxicity of potassium arsenite arises from arsenic’s high affinity for sulfhydryl groups. The formation of these arsenite-sulfur bonds impairs the functionality of certain enzymes such as glutathione reductase, glutathione peroxidases, thioredoxin reductase, and thioredoxin peroxidase. These enzymes are all closely affiliated with the defense of free radicals and the metabolism of pyruvate. Thus, exposure to potassium arsenite and other arsenite containing compounds results in the production of damaging oxygen free radicals and the arrest of cellular metabolism.

Additionally, arsenite containing compounds have also been labeled carcinogens. The carcinogenicity of potassium arsenite arises from its ability to inhibit DNA repair and methylation. This impairment of the cellular machinery can lead to cancer because the cells can no longer repair or arrest mutations and a tumor results. All of these conditions exhibit the hazardous nature of potassium arsenite and other arsenite containing compounds. This is evidenced by a LD_{50} of 14 mg/kg for rats and a TDL of 74 mg/kg for humans.
