= Gadolinium iodide =

Gadolinium iodide may refer to:

- Gadolinium diiodide, GdI_{2}
- Gadolinium(III) iodide (gadolinium triiodide), GdI_{3}
