= Mercury iodide =

Mercury iodide may refer to one of the following chemical compounds:

- Mercury(I) iodide, Hg_{2}I_{2}
- Mercury(II) iodide, HgI_{2}
- Tetraiodomercurate(II), HgI^{2−}_{4}
