= Mercury(II) sulfate =

- Mercury(II) sulfate

Names
- Other names: Mercuric sulfate; Mercurypersulfate; Mercury Bisulfate

Identifiers
CAS Number	7783-35-9
3D model (JSmol)	Interactive image
ChemSpider	22950
ECHA InfoCard	100.029.083
EC Number	231-992-5
PubChem CID	24544
RTECS number	OX0500000
UNII	J4L3PPG58I
UN number	UN1645
CompTox Dashboard (EPA)	DTXSID7064819
- InChI: InChI=1S/Hg.H2O4S/c;1-5(2,3)4/h;(H2,1,2,3,4)/q+2;/p-2 Key: DOBUSJIVSSJEDA-UHFFFAOYSA-L
- SMILES: [O-]S(=O)(=O)[O-].[Hg+2]

Properties
Chemical formula	HgSO_{4}
Molar mass	296.65 g·mol^{−1}
Appearance	white monoclinic crystals
Odor	odorless
Density	6.47 g/cm^{3}
Sublimation conditions	450 °C (842 °F) (dec.)
Solubility in water	Decomposes in water to yellow mercuric subsulfate and sulfuric acid.
Solubility	soluble in hot sulfuric acid (H_{2}SO_{4}), NaCl solution
Magnetic susceptibility (χ)	−78.1×10^{−6} cm^{3}/mol

Structure (monohydrate)
Crystal structure	orthorhombic
Space group	Pnma [No. 31]
Lattice constant	a = 7.8796(9) Å, b = 5.4209(4) Å, c = 8.9704(7) Å
Lattice volume (V)	383.17 Å^{3}
Formula units (Z)	2
Coordination geometry	Octahedral at Hg.

Thermochemistry
Std enthalpy of formation (Δ_{f}H^{⦵}_{298})	−707.5 kJ⋅mol^{−1}

Hazards
- GHS labelling
Pictograms	(GHS05: Corrosive) (GHS06: Toxic) (GHS07: Exclamation mark) (GHS08: Health hazard) (GHS09: Environmental hazard)
Signal word	Danger
Hazard statements	H300+H310+H330, H314, H317, H341, H373, H410
Precautionary statements	P201, P202, P260, P262, P264, P270, P271, P272, P273, P280, P284, P301+P310+P330, P301+P330+P331, P303+P361+P353, P304+P340+P310, P305+P351+P338+P310, P308+P313, P333+P313, P361+P364, P391, P403+P233, P405, P501
NFPA 704 (fire diamond)	4 0 1
Autoignition temperature	> 450 °C (842 °F; 723 K)
Threshold limit value (TLV)	0.1 mg/m^{3} [skin] (TWA)
- Lethal dose or concentration (LD, LC)
LD_{50} (median dose)	25 mg/kg (oral, mouse); 57 mg/kg (oral, rat); 625 mg/kg (dermal, rat)
- NIOSH (US health exposure limits)
PEL (Permissible)	0.1 mg/m^{3} (ceiling) [skin]
REL (Recommended)	0.1 mg/m^{3} (ceiling) [skin]
IDLH (Immediate danger)	10 mg/m^{3}
- Except where otherwise noted, data are given for materials in their standard state (at 25 °C [77 °F], 100 kPa). verify (what is ?) Infobox references

Mercury(II) sulfate, commonly called mercuric sulfate, is the chemical compound HgSO_{4}. It is an odorless salt that forms white granules or crystalline powder. In water, it separates into an insoluble basic sulfate with a yellow color and sulfuric acid.

== Structure ==
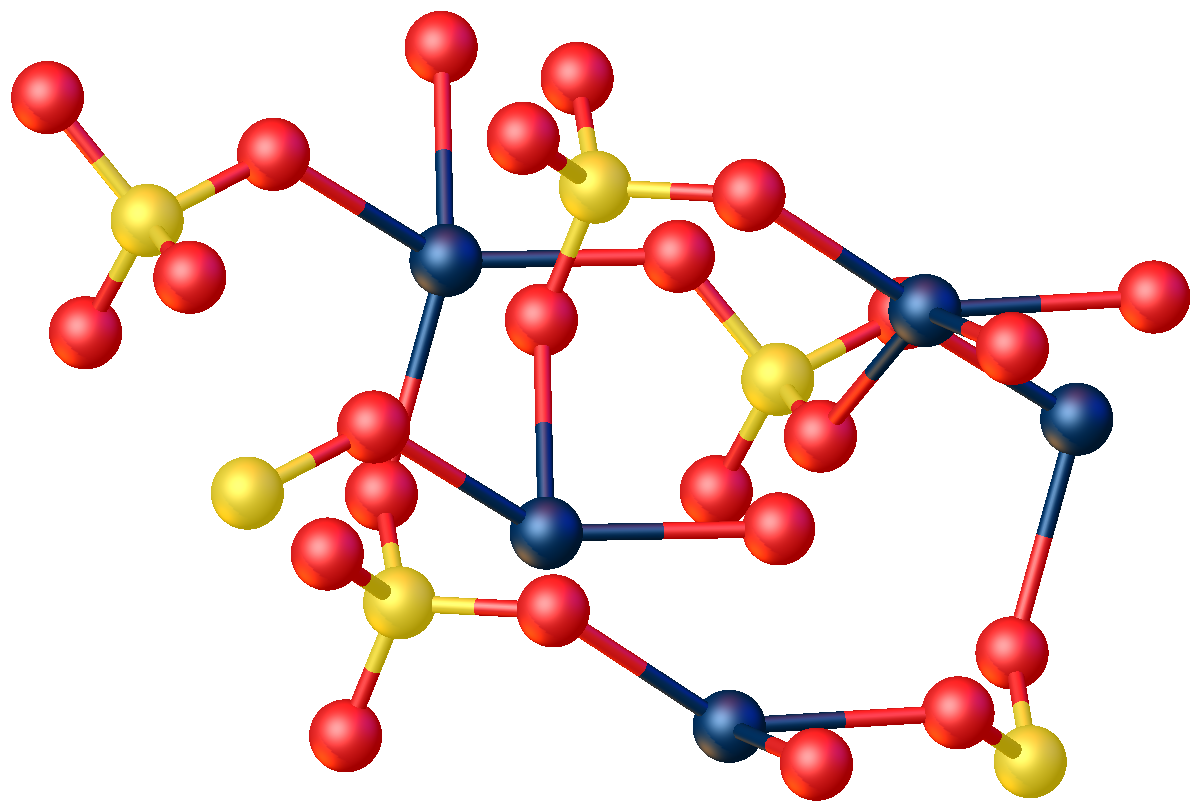
Portion of structure of HgSO_{4} illustrating the distorted tetrahedral geometry at Hg (dark blue spheres)

The anhydrous compound features Hg^{2+} in a highly distorted tetrahedral HgO_{4} environment. Two Hg−O distances are 2.22 Å and the others are 2.28 and 2.42 Å. In the monohydrate, Hg^{2+} adopts a linear coordination geometry with Hg−O (sulfate) and Hg−O (water) bond lengths of 2.179 and 2.228 Å respectively. Four weaker bonds are also observed with Hg−O distances >2.5 Å.

== History ==
In 1932, the Japanese chemical company Chisso Corporation began using mercury sulfate as the catalyst for the production of acetaldehyde from acetylene and water. Though it was unknown at the time, methylmercury is formed as a side product of this reaction. Exposure and consumption of the mercury waste products, including methylmercury, that were dumped into Minamata Bay by Chisso are believed to be the cause of Minamata disease in Minamata, Japan.

== Production ==
Mercury sulfate can be produced by treating mercury with hot concentrated sulfuric acid:

Hg + 2 H_{2}SO_{4} → HgSO_{4} + SO_{2} + 2 H_{2}O

Alternatively yellow mercuric oxide reacts also with concentrated sulfuric acid.

== Uses ==
=== Denigés' reagent ===
An acidic solution of mercury sulfate is known as Denigés' reagent. It was commonly used throughout the 20th century as a qualitative analysis reagent. If Denigés' reagent is added to a solution containing compounds that have tertiary alcohols, a yellow or red precipitate will form.

=== Hydration reactions ===
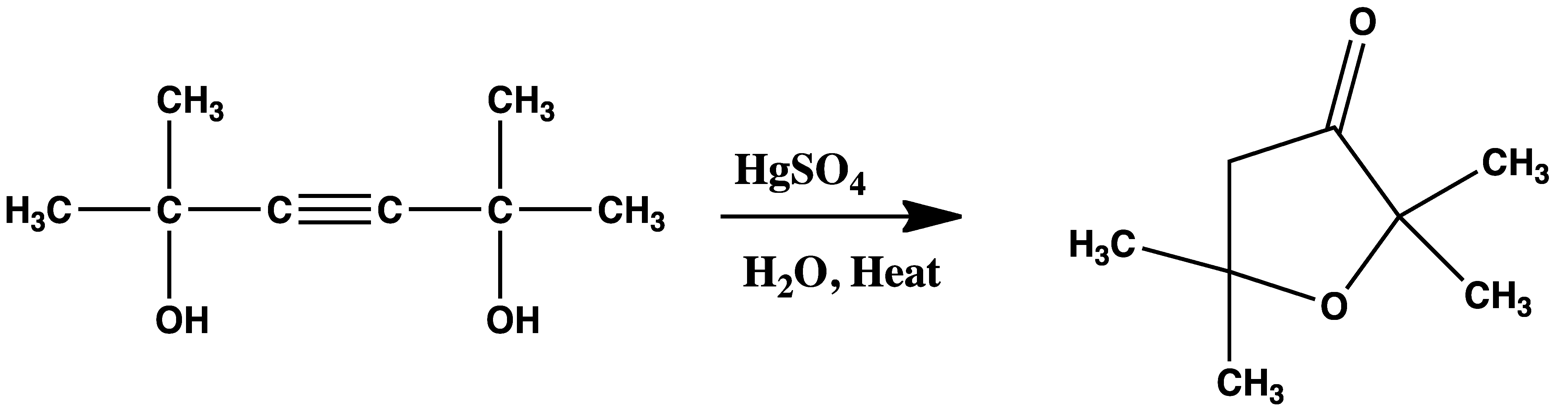
Conversion of 2,5-dimethylhexyne-2,5-diol to 2,2,5,5-tetramethylte-trahydrofuran-3-one

Mercury sulfate, as well as other mercury(II) compounds, are commonly used as catalysts in oxymercuration-demercuration, a type of electrophilic addition reaction that results in hydration of an unsaturated compound. The hydration of an alkene gives an alcohol. The regioselectivity is that predicted by Markovnikov's rule. For an alkyne, the result is an enol, which tautomerizes to give the carbonyl. At one time, this chemistry was employed commercially for the preparation of acetaldehyde from acetylene:

C_{2}H_{2} + H_{2}O → CH_{3}CHO

A related and specialized example is the conversion of 2,5-dimethylhexyne-2,5-diol to 2,2,5,5-tetramethyltetrahydrofuran using aqueous mercury sulfate without the addition of acid.

== Health issues ==
HgSO_{4} causes burns by all exposure routes. Inhalation of HgSO_{4} can result in severe swelling and cessation of breathing. Exposure of the eyes to HgSO_{4} can cause ulceration of conjunctiva and cornea. If the skin is exposed to HgSO_{4} it may cause an allergic skin reaction. Ingestion of HgSO_{4} may cause perforation of the stomach or esophagus, necrosis, pain, vomiting, and severe vomiting. Ingestion can result in kidney damage or death. Symptoms from any exposure may be delayed.

It was used in the late 19th century to induce vomiting for medical reasons.
