= Mercury(I) bromide =

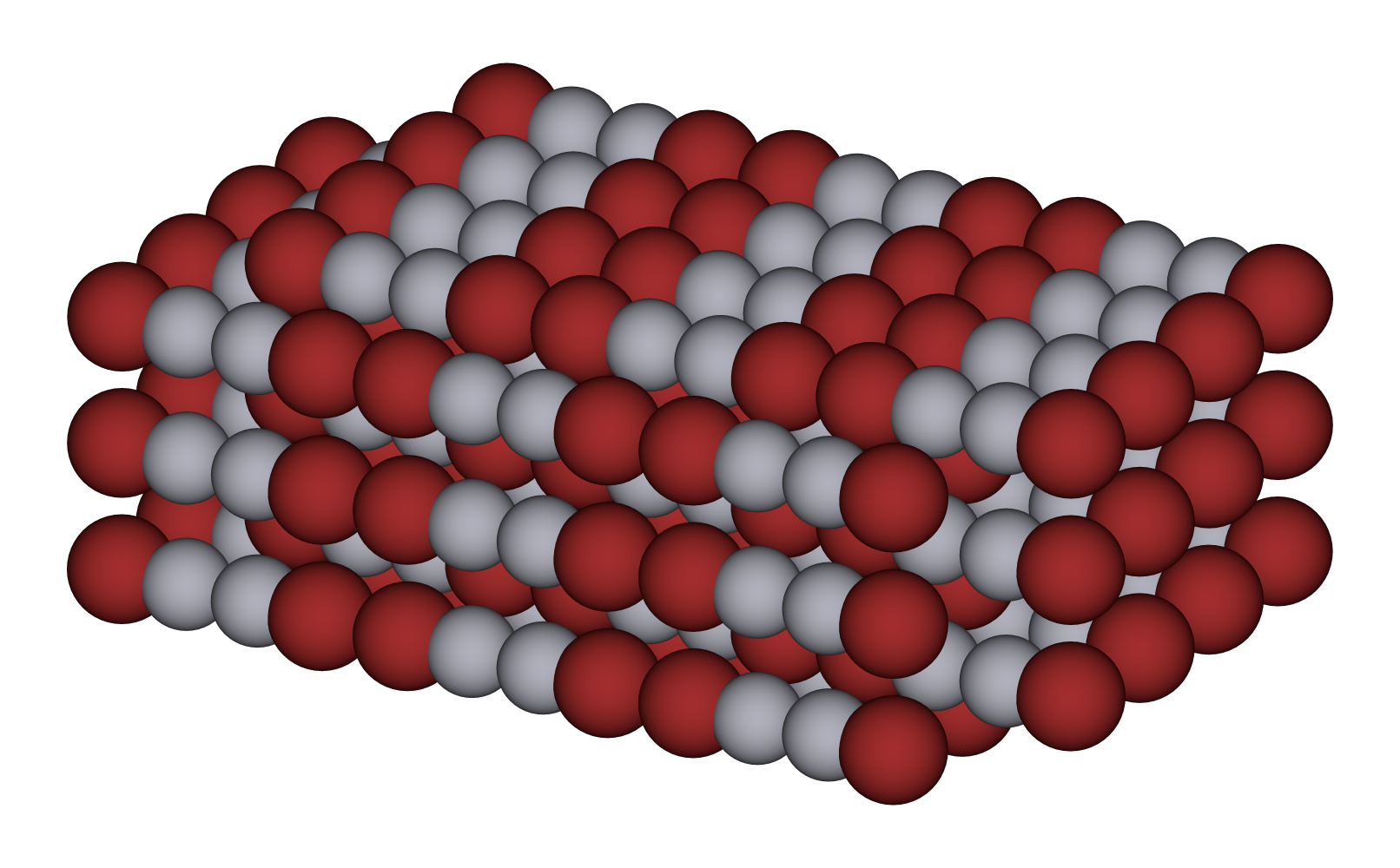

Names
- IUPAC name Dimercury dibromide
- Other names Mercury(I) bromide Mercurous bromide

Identifiers
CAS Number	10031-18-2
3D model (JSmol)	Interactive image
ChemSpider	23214
ECHA InfoCard	100.150.337
EC Number	621-489-2
PubChem CID	24829
UNII	JSJ4936A2S
UN number	1634
CompTox Dashboard (EPA)	DTXSID3065879
- InChI: InChI=1S/2BrH.2Hg/h2*1H;;/q;;2*+1/p-2 Key: RVARJMCTILSHND-UHFFFAOYSA-L
- SMILES: Br[Hg][Hg]Br

Properties
Chemical formula	Hg_{2}Br_{2}
Molar mass	560.99 g/mol
Appearance	white to yellow tetragonal crystals
Odor	odorless
Density	7.307 g/cm^{3}, solid
Melting point	405 °C (761 °F; 678 K)
Boiling point	~ 390 °C (734 °F; 663 K) sublimes
Solubility in water	3.9 × 10^{−5} g/100 mL
Solubility product (K_{sp})	6.4×10^{−23}
Solubility	insoluble in ether, acetone, alcohol
Magnetic susceptibility (χ)	−28.6·10^{−6} cm^{3}/mol

Structure
Molecular shape	linear

Hazards
- GHS labelling
Pictograms	(GHS06: Toxic) (GHS08: Health hazard) (GHS09: Environmental hazard)
Signal word	Danger
Hazard statements	H300, H310, H330, H373, H410
Precautionary statements	P260, P262, P264, P270, P271, P273, P280, P284, P301+P310, P302+P350, P304+P340, P310, P314, P320, P321, P330, P361, P363, P391, P403+P233, P405, P501
Flash point	non-flammable

Related compounds
Other anions	Mercury(I) fluoride Mercury(I) chloride Mercury(I) iodide
Other cations	Zinc bromide Cadmium bromide
Related compounds	Mercury(II) bromide
- Except where otherwise noted, data are given for materials in their standard state (at 25 °C [77 °F], 100 kPa). verify (what is ?) Infobox references

Mercury(I) bromide or mercurous bromide is the chemical compound composed of mercury and bromine with the formula Hg_{2}Br_{2}. It changes color from white to yellow when heated and fluoresces a salmon color when exposed to ultraviolet light. It has applications in acousto-optical devices.

A very rare mineral form is called kuzminite and has the chemical formula Hg_{2}(Br,Cl)_{2}.

== Reactions ==
Mercury(I) bromide is prepared by the oxidation of elemental mercury with elemental bromine or by adding sodium bromide to a solution of mercury(I) nitrate. It decomposes to mercury(II) bromide and elemental mercury.

== Structure ==
In common with other Hg(I) (mercurous) compounds which contain linear X-Hg-Hg-X units, Hg_{2}Br_{2} contains linear BrHg_{2}Br units with an Hg-Hg bond length of 249 pm (Hg-Hg in the metal is 300 pm) and an Hg-Br bond length of 271 pm. The overall coordination of each Hg atom is octahedral as, in addition to the two nearest neighbours, there are four other Br atoms at 332 pm. The compound is often formulated as Hg_{2}^{2+}·2Br^{−}, although it is actually a molecular compound.
