= Mercury(I) fluoride =

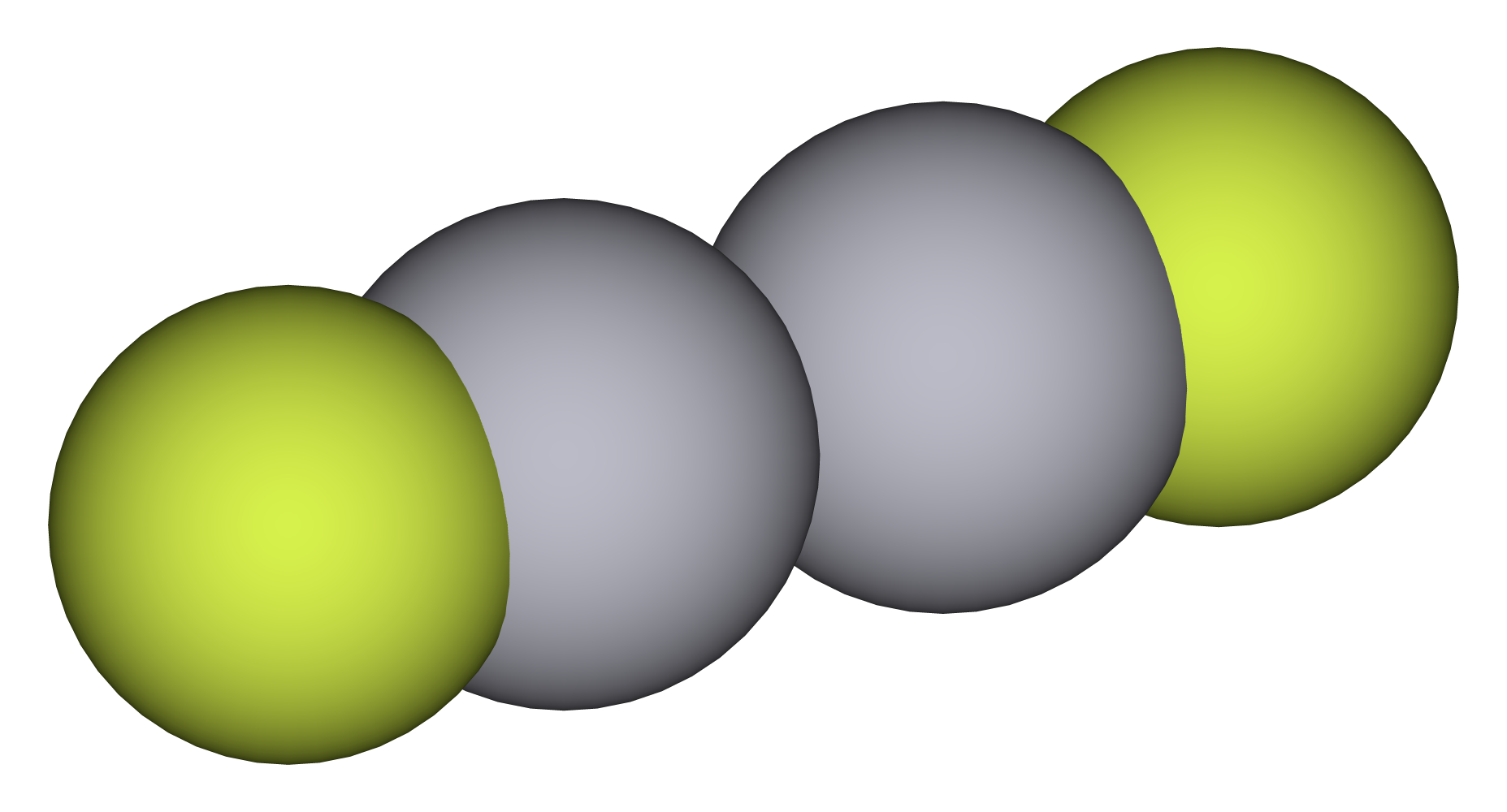
- Mercury(I) fluoride

Names
- IUPAC name Dimercury difluoride
- Other names Mercury(I) fluoride Mercurous fluoride

Identifiers
CAS Number	13967-25-4
3D model (JSmol)	Interactive image
ChemSpider	21160213
ECHA InfoCard	100.034.302
EC Number	237-747-9
PubChem CID	4084556
UNII	5Q0756885Y
CompTox Dashboard (EPA)	DTXSID6064820
- InChI: InChI=1S/2FH.2Hg/h2*1H;;/q;;2*+1/p-2 Key: FQZUXVBMUHSNRN-UHFFFAOYSA-L
- SMILES: F[Hg][Hg]F

Properties
Chemical formula	Hg_{2}F_{2}
Molar mass	439.177 g/mol
Appearance	yellow cubic crystals
Density	8.73 g/cm^{3}, solid
Solubility in water	decomposes
Solubility product (K_{sp})	3.1×10^{−6}
Magnetic susceptibility (χ)	−26.5·10^{−6} cm^{3}/mol

Hazards
- GHS labelling
Pictograms	(GHS06: Toxic) (GHS08: Health hazard) (GHS09: Environmental hazard)
Signal word	Danger
Hazard statements	H300, H310, H330, H373, H410
NFPA 704 (fire diamond)	4 0 0
Flash point	non-flammable

Related compounds
Other anions	Mercury(I) chloride Mercury(I) bromide Mercury(I) iodide
Other cations	Zinc fluoride Cadmium fluoride
Related compounds	Mercury(II) fluoride
- Except where otherwise noted, data are given for materials in their standard state (at 25 °C [77 °F], 100 kPa). verify (what is ?) Infobox references

Mercury(I) fluoride or mercurous fluoride is the chemical compound composed of mercury and fluorine with the formula Hg_{2}F_{2}. It consists of small yellow cubic crystals, which turn black when exposed to light.

== Synthesis ==
Mercury(I) fluoride is prepared by the reaction of mercury(I) carbonate with hydrofluoric acid:

Hg_{2}CO_{3} + 2 HF → Hg_{2}F_{2} + CO_{2} + H_{2}O

== Reactions ==
When added to water, mercury(I) fluoride hydrolyzes to elemental liquid mercury, mercury(II) oxide, and hydrofluoric acid:

Hg_{2}F_{2} + H_{2}O → Hg + HgO + 2 HF

It can be used in the Swarts reaction to convert alkyl halides into alkyl fluorides:

2 R-X + Hg_{2}F_{2} → 2 R-F + Hg_{2}X_{2}
where X = Cl, Br, I

== Structure ==
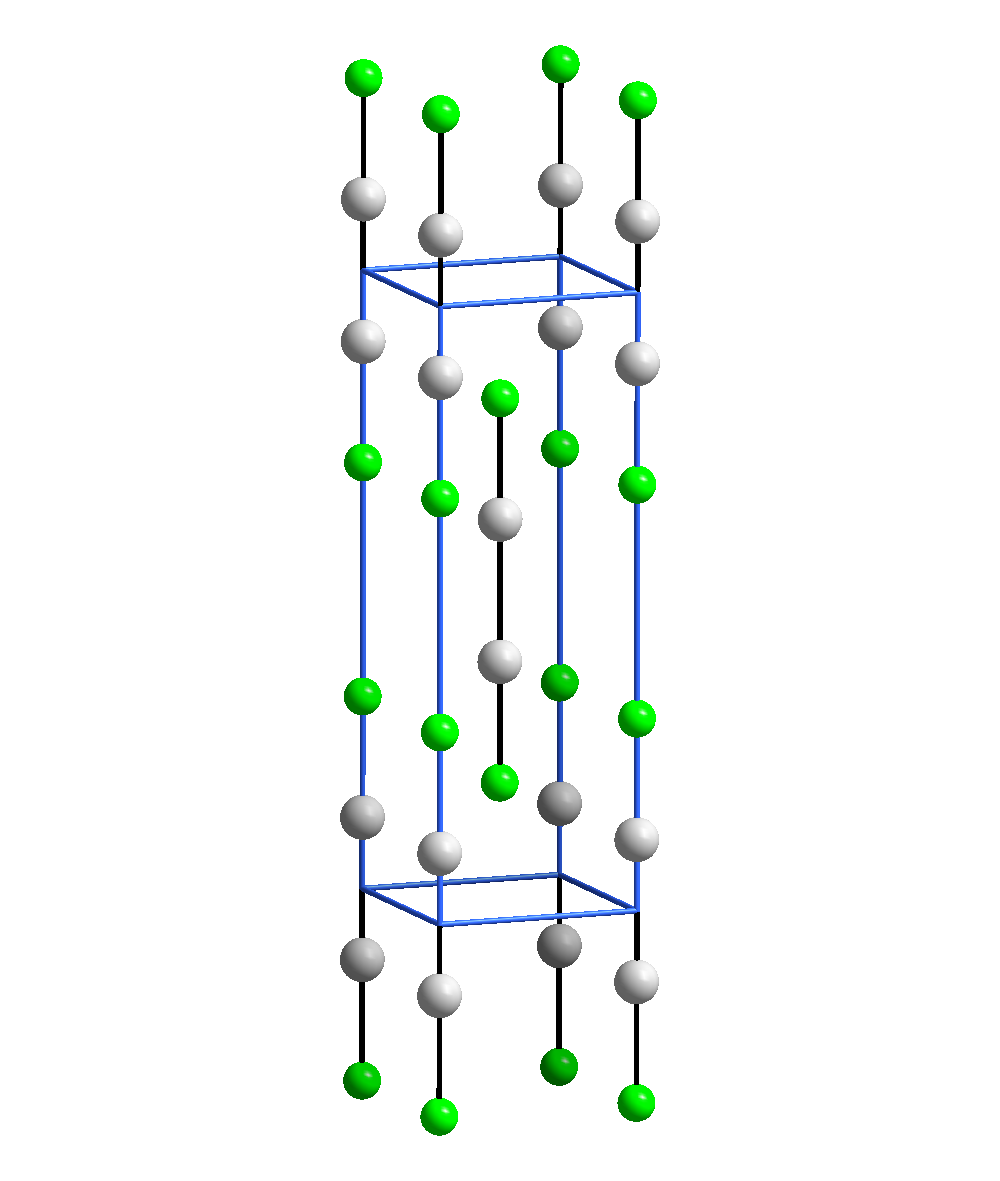
Unit cell of Hg_{2}F_{2}, with F from adjacent molecules coordinating the Hg atoms

In common with other Hg(I) (mercurous) compounds which contain linear X-Hg-Hg-X units, Hg_{2}F_{2} contains linear FHg_{2}F units with an Hg-Hg bond length of 251 pm (Hg-Hg in the metal is 300 pm) and an Hg-F bond length of 214 pm. The overall coordination of each Hg atom is a distorted octahedron; in addition to the bonded F and other Hg of the molecule, there are four other F atoms at 272 pm. The compound is often formulated as Hg_{2}^{2+}[F^{−}]_{2}.
