= Mercury(I) iodide =

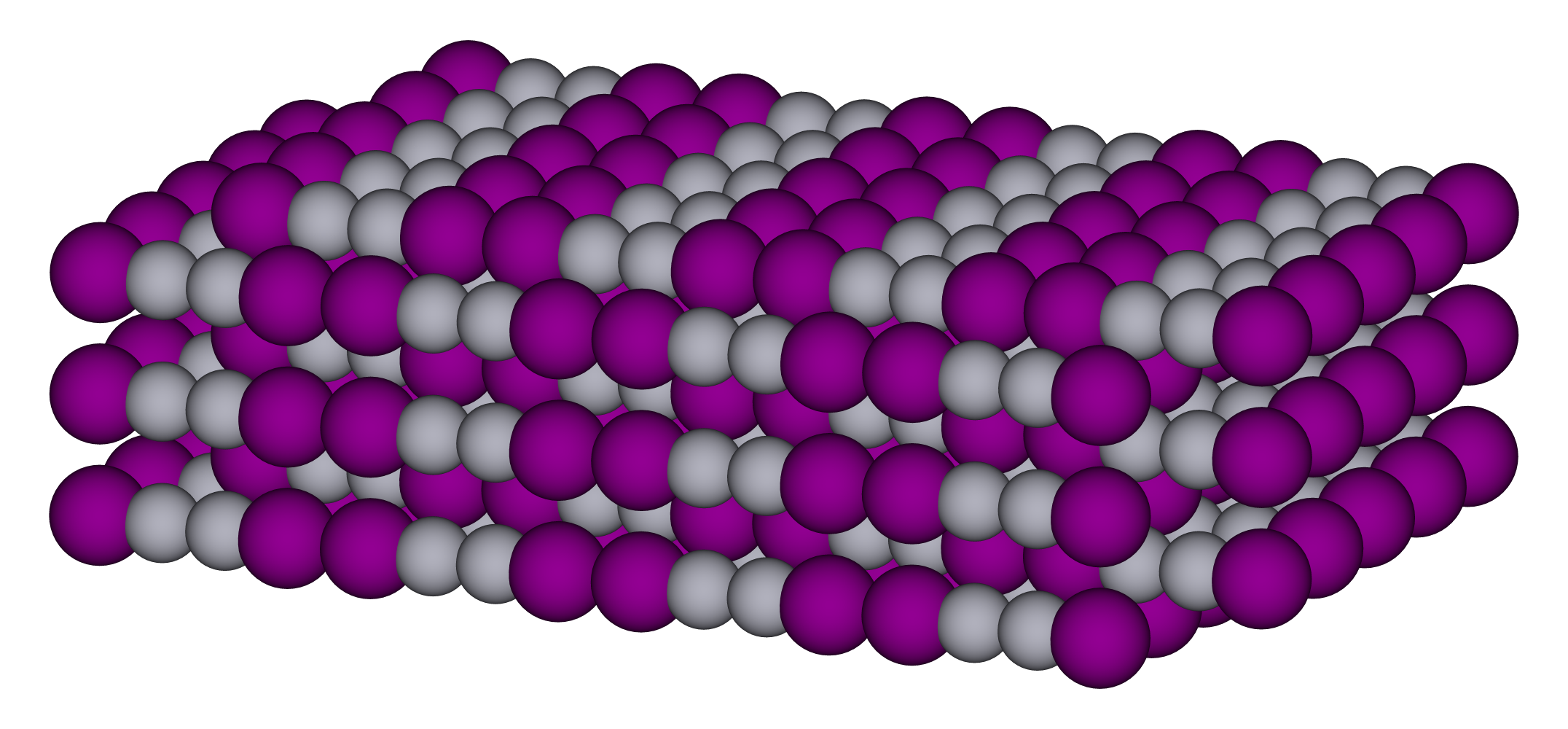
- Spacefil model of crystalline mercury(I) iodide

Names
- IUPAC name Dimercury diiodide
- Other names Mercury(I) iodide Mercurous iodide Red mercury

Identifiers
CAS Number	15385-57-6
3D model (JSmol)	Interactive image
ChemSpider	21160367
ECHA InfoCard	100.035.811
EC Number	239-409-6
PubChem CID	27243
UNII	HT0935F2JR
UN number	1638
CompTox Dashboard (EPA)	DTXSID701314265
- InChI: InChI=1S/2Hg.2HI/h;;2*1H/q2*+1;;/p-2 Key: NDKKKEPYKOOXLG-UHFFFAOYSA-L
- SMILES: I[Hg][Hg]I

Properties
Chemical formula	Hg_{2}I_{2}
Molar mass	654.99 g mol^{−1}
Appearance	Dark yellow, opaque crystals
Odor	Odourless
Density	7.7 g cm^{−3}
Solubility product (K_{sp})	5.2×10^{−29}
Magnetic susceptibility (χ)	−41.5·10^{−6} cm^{3}/mol

Thermochemistry
Std molar entropy (S^{⦵}_{298})	241.47 J K^{−1} mol^{−1}
Std enthalpy of formation (Δ_{f}H^{⦵}_{298})	−119.09 kJ mol^{−1}

Hazards
- GHS labelling
Pictograms	(GHS06: Toxic) (GHS08: Health hazard) (GHS09: Environmental hazard)
Signal word	Danger
Hazard statements	H300, H310, H330, H373, H410
Precautionary statements	P260, P273, P280, P284, P301+P310

Related compounds
Other anions	Mercury(I) bromide Mercury(I) chloride Mercury(I) fluoride
Related compounds	Mercury(II) iodide
- Except where otherwise noted, data are given for materials in their standard state (at 25 °C [77 °F], 100 kPa). verify (what is ?) Infobox references

Mercury(I) iodide is a chemical compound of mercury and iodine. The chemical formula is Hg_{2}I_{2}. It is photosensitive and decomposes easily to mercury and HgI_{2}.

== Synthesis ==
Mercury(I) iodide can be prepared by directly reacting mercury and iodine.

== Structure ==
In common with other Hg(I) (mercurous) compounds which contain linear X-Hg-Hg-X units, Hg_{2}I_{2} contains linear IHg_{2}I units with an Hg-Hg bond length of 272 pm (Hg-Hg in the metal is 300 pm) and an Hg-I bond length of 268 pm. The overall coordination of each Hg atom is octahedral as it has in addition to the two nearest neighbours there are four other I atoms at 351 pm. The compound is often formulated as Hg_{2}^{2+}·2I^{−}.

== Historical Uses ==
Mercury(I) iodide was a commonly used as a drug in the 19th century, sometimes under the contemporary name of protiodide of mercury. It was used to treat a wide range of conditions; everything from acne to kidney disease and in particular was the treatment of choice for syphilis. It was available over the counter at any drugstore in the world, the most common form being a concoction of protiodide, licorice, glycerin and marshmallow.

Taken orally, and in low doses, protiodide causes excessive salivation, fetid breath, spongy and bleeding gums and sore teeth. Excessive use or an overdose causes physical weakness, loss of teeth, hemolysing (destruction of the red blood cells) of the blood and necrosis of the bones and tissues of the body. Early signs of an overdose or excessive use are muscular tremors, chorea, and locomotor ataxia. Violent bloody vomiting and voiding also occur.

Protiodide is banned as a medication, even though it persisted in use as a quack remedy until the early 20th century.

== See also ==
- Mercury(II) iodide, HgI_{2}
