= Mercury(I) nitrate =

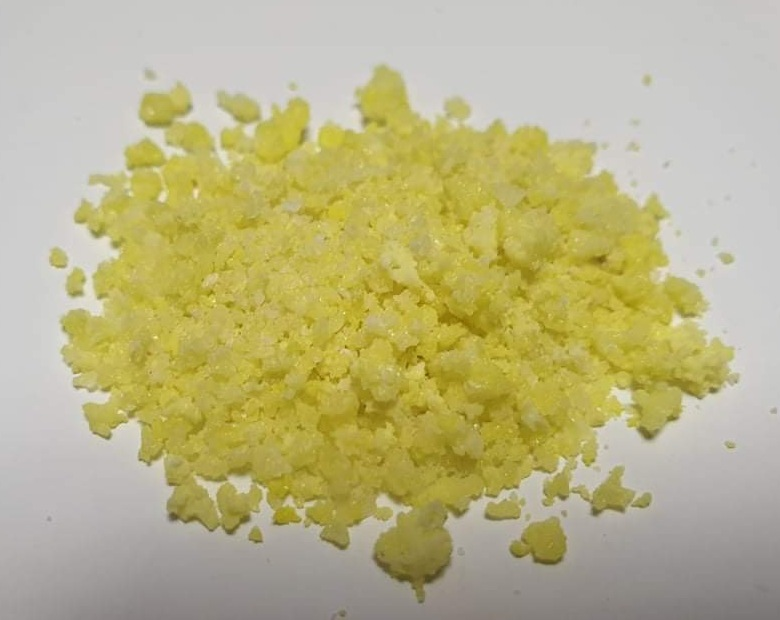
- Mercury(I) nitrate dihydrate

Names
- IUPAC name Mercury(I) nitrate
- Other names Mercurous nitrate

Identifiers
CAS Number	(anhydrous): 10415-75-5; (dihydrate): 14836-60-3
3D model (JSmol)	(anhydrous): Interactive image; (dihydrate): Interactive image
ChemSpider	(anhydrous): 23580; (dihydrate): 9493944
ECHA InfoCard	100.202.814
EC Number	(anhydrous): 233-886-4
PubChem CID	(anhydrous): 25247
UNII	(anhydrous): J78005WL7R; (dihydrate): Z92K1EV5HQ
UN number	1627
CompTox Dashboard (EPA)	(anhydrous): DTXSID30163975
- InChI: (anhydrous): InChI=1S/Hg.NO3/c;2-1(3)4/q+1;-1 Key: DRXYRSRECMWYAV-UHFFFAOYSA-N; (dihydrate): InChI=1S/2Hg.2NO3.2H2O/c;;2*2-1(3)4;;/h;;;;2*1H2/q2*+1;2*-1;; Key: LSABZDVKJBWCBE-UHFFFAOYSA-N
- SMILES: (anhydrous): [N+](=O)([O-])[O-].[Hg+][Hg+].[N+](=O)([O-])[O-]; (dihydrate): [N+](=O)([O-])[O-].[OH2+][Hg][Hg][OH2+].[N+](=O)([O-])[O-]

Properties
Chemical formula	Hg_{2}(NO_{3})_{2} (anhydrous); Hg_{2}(NO_{3})_{2}·2H_{2}O (dihydrate)
Molar mass	525.19 g/mol (anhydrous); 561.22 g/mol (dihydrate)
Appearance	white monoclinic crystals (anhydrous) colorless crystals (dihydrate)
Density	5.7 g/cm^{3} (anhydrous); 4.8 g/cm^{3} (dihydrate)
Melting point	decomposes at 125 °C (anhydrous) decomposes at 70 °C (dihydrate)
Solubility in water	soluble, slow hydrolysis
Magnetic susceptibility (χ)	−27.95·10^{−6} cm^{3}/mol

Structure
Crystal structure	monoclinic
Space group	P2_{1}
Lattice constant	a = 6.21 Å, b = 8.34 Å, c = 11.70 Å α = 90°, β = 93.6°, γ = 90°

Hazards
- GHS labelling
Pictograms	(GHS06: Toxic) (GHS08: Health hazard) (GHS09: Environmental hazard)
Signal word	Danger
Hazard statements	H300, H310, H330, H373, H410
Precautionary statements	P260, P262, P264, P270, P271, P273, P280, P284, P301+P316, P302+P352, P304+P340, P316, P319, P320, P321, P330, P361+P364, P391, P403+P233, P405, P501
NFPA 704 (fire diamond)	3 1 1 OX

Related compounds
Other anions	Mercury(I) fluoride Mercury(I) chloride Mercury(I) bromide Mercury(I) iodide
Other cations	Mercury(II) nitrate
- Except where otherwise noted, data are given for materials in their standard state (at 25 °C [77 °F], 100 kPa). verify (what is ?) Infobox references

Mercury(I) nitrate is an inorganic compound, a salt of mercury and nitric acid with the formula Hg_{2}(NO_{3})_{2}. It is a colorless solid, used as a precursor to other Hg_{2}^{2+} complexes.

== Structure ==
The structure of the dihydrate has been determined by X-ray crystallography. It consists of a [H_{2}O-Hg-Hg-OH_{2}]^{2+} center, with a Hg-Hg distance of 251 pm.

== Reactions ==
Mercury(I) nitrate is formed when elemental mercury is combined with dilute nitric acid (concentrated nitric acid will yield mercury(II) nitrate). Mercury(I) nitrate is a reducing agent which is oxidized upon contact with air.

Dehydration of the dihydrate under vacuum yields the anhydrous form.

Mercuric(II) nitrate reacts with elemental mercury(0) to form mercurous(I) nitrate (comproportionation reaction):

Hg(NO_{3})_{2} + Hg ⇌ Hg_{2}(NO_{3})_{2}

Solutions of mercury(I) nitrate are acidic due to slow reaction with water:

Hg_{2}(NO_{3})_{2} + H_{2}O ⇌ Hg_{2}(NO_{3})(OH) + HNO_{3}

Hg_{2}(NO_{3})(OH) forms a yellow precipitate.

If the solution is boiled, or exposed to light, mercury(I) nitrate undergoes a disproportionation reaction yielding elemental mercury and mercury(II) nitrate:

Hg_{2}(NO_{3})_{2} ⇌ Hg + Hg(NO_{3})_{2}

These reactions are reversible; the nitric acid formed can redissolve the basic salt.
