= Cadmium tellurite =

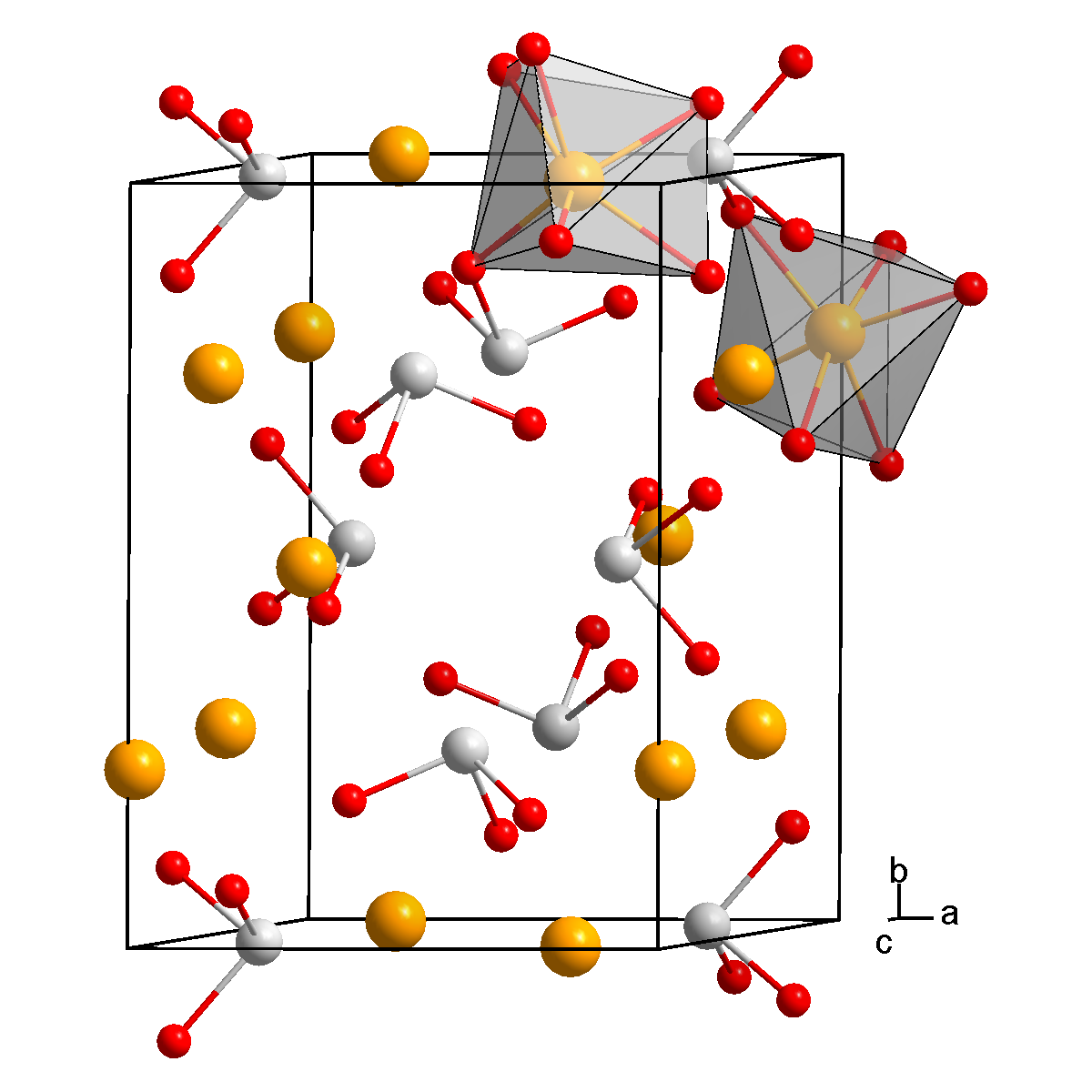

Identifiers
CAS Number	15851-44-2
3D model (JSmol)	Interactive image
ChemSpider	146511
ECHA InfoCard	100.036.316
EC Number	239-963-9
PubChem CID	167475
CompTox Dashboard (EPA)	DTXSID50935934
- InChI: InChI=1S/Cd.H2O3Te/c;1-4(2)3/h;(H2,1,2,3)/q+2;/p-2 Key: GKMPTXZNGKKTDU-UHFFFAOYSA-L
- SMILES: [Cd+2].[O-] [Te](=O)[O-]

Properties
Chemical formula	CdO_{3}Te
Molar mass	288.01 g·mol^{−1}
Appearance	colourless solid
Melting point	695 °C
Boiling point	1050 °C (decomposes)
Solubility in water	insoluble

Hazards
- GHS labelling
Pictograms	(GHS07: Exclamation mark)
Signal word	Warning
Hazard statements	H302, H312, H332
Precautionary statements	P261, P264, P270, P271, P280, P301+P317, P302+P352, P304+P340, P317, P321, P330, P362+P364, P501

Related compounds
Other anions	Cadmium telluride Cadmium tellurate Cadmium sulfite Cadmium selenite
Other cations	Calcium tellurite Strontium tellurite Barium tellurite
- Except where otherwise noted, data are given for materials in their standard state (at 25 °C [77 °F], 100 kPa). Infobox references

Cadmium tellurite is the tellurite salt of cadmium, with the chemical formula CdTeO_{3}.

== Preparation ==
Cadmium tellurite can be prepared by the reaction of cadmium sulfate and sodium tellurite in ammonia.

== Properties ==
Cadmium tellurite is a colourless solid that is insoluble in water. It is a semiconductor. It is part of the monoclinic crystal system, with space group P2_{1}/c (No. 14). It can also crystallize in the cubic crystal system and hexagonal crystal system at temperatures above 540 °C.
