= Cadmium hydroxide =

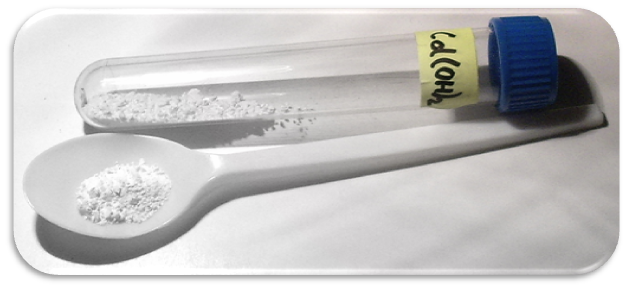
- Cadmium hydroxide structure

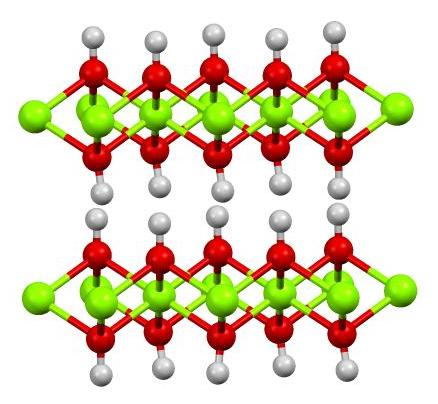

Names
- IUPAC name Cadmium(II) hydroxide

Identifiers
CAS Number	21041-95-2
3D model (JSmol)	Interactive image
ChemSpider	8488675
ECHA InfoCard	100.040.137
PubChem CID	10313210
UNII	6Y413R87BT
CompTox Dashboard (EPA)	DTXSID9066671
- InChI: InChI=1S/Cd.2H2O/h;2*1H2/q+2;;/p-2 Key: PLLZRTNVEXYBNA-UHFFFAOYSA-L; InChI=1/Cd.2H2O/h;2*1H2/q+2;;/p-2 Key: PLLZRTNVEXYBNA-NUQVWONBAA
- SMILES: [Cd+2].[OH-].[OH-]

Properties
Chemical formula	Cd(OH)_{2}
Molar mass	146.43 g/mol
Appearance	white crystals
Density	4.79 g/cm^{3}
Melting point	130 °C (266 °F; 403 K)
Boiling point	300 °C (572 °F; 573 K) (decomposes)
Solubility in water	0.026 g/100 mL
Solubility product (K_{sp})	7.2×10^{−15}
Solubility	soluble in dilute acids
Acidity (pK_{a})	10
Magnetic susceptibility (χ)	−41.0·10^{−6} cm^{3}/mol

Structure
Crystal structure	hexagonal

Thermochemistry
Std molar entropy (S^{⦵}_{298})	96 J·mol^{−1}·K^{−1}
Std enthalpy of formation (Δ_{f}H^{⦵}_{298})	−561 kJ·mol^{−1}

Hazards
- NIOSH (US health exposure limits)
PEL (Permissible)	[1910.1027] TWA 0.005 mg/m^{3} (as Cd)
REL (Recommended)	Ca
IDLH (Immediate danger)	Ca [9 mg/m^{3} (as Cd)]

Related compounds
Other anions	Cadmium chloride, Cadmium iodide
Other cations	Zinc hydroxide, Calcium hydroxide, Magnesium hydroxide
- Except where otherwise noted, data are given for materials in their standard state (at 25 °C [77 °F], 100 kPa). verify (what is ?) Infobox references

Cadmium hydroxide is an inorganic compound with the formula Cd(OH)_{2}. It is a white crystalline ionic compound that is a key component of nickel–cadmium battery.

== Structure ==
Cadmium hydroxide adopts the same structure as Mg(OH)_{2}, consisting of slabs of metal centers, each bonded by six hydroxide ligands. The Cd(OH)_{2} structure is a recurring motif in inorganic chemistry. For example it is adopted by vanadium ditelluride.

== Preparation, and reactions ==
Cadmium hydroxide is produced by treating an aqueous solution containing Cd^{2+} (say cadmium nitrate) with sodium hydroxide:

Cd(NO_{3})_{2} + 2 NaOH → Cd(OH)_{2} + 2 NaNO_{3}

Cd(OH)_{2} and cadmium oxide exhibit similar reactions. Cadmium hydroxide is more basic than zinc hydroxide. It forms the anionic complex [Cd(OH)_{4}]^{2−} when treated with concentrated base. It forms complexes with cyanide, thiocyanate, and ammonia.

Cadmium hydroxide loses water on heating, producing cadmium oxide. Decomposition commences at 130 °C and is complete at 300 °C. Reactions with mineral acids (HX) gives the corresponding cadmium salts (CdX_{2}). With hydrochloric acid, sulfuric acid, and nitric acid, the products are cadmium chloride, cadmium sulfate, and cadmium nitrate, respectively.

== Uses ==
It is generated in storage battery anodes, in nickel-cadmium and silver-cadmium storage batteries in its discharge:

2 NiO(OH) + 2 H_{2}O + Cd → Cd(OH)_{2} + 2 Ni(OH)_{2}
