= Cadmium acetate =

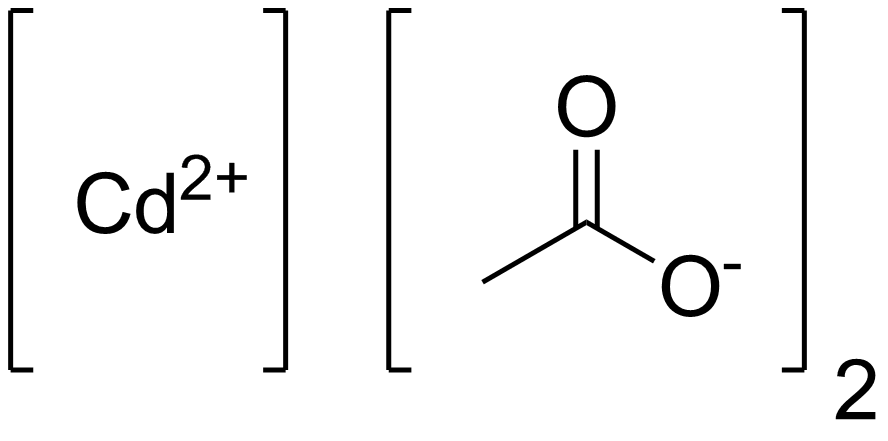

Names
- IUPAC name Cadmium acetate
- Other names Cadmium diacetate

Identifiers
CAS Number	543-90-8; 5743-04-4 (dihydrate)
3D model (JSmol)	ionic form: Interactive image; coordination form: Interactive image
ChemSpider	10521
ECHA InfoCard	100.008.049
EC Number	208-853-2
PubChem CID	10986
RTECS number	AF7505000
UNII	95KC50Z1L0; SA10IX931V (dihydrate)
UN number	2570
CompTox Dashboard (EPA)	DTXSID1020225
- InChI: InChI=1S/2C2H4O2.Cd/c2*1-2(3)4;/h2*1H3,(H,3,4);/q;;+2/p-2 Key: LHQLJMJLROMYRN-UHFFFAOYSA-L; InChI=1/2C2H4O2.Cd/c2*1-2(3)4;/h2*1H3,(H,3,4);/q;;+2/p-2 Key: LHQLJMJLROMYRN-NUQVWONBAK
- SMILES: ionic form: [Cd+2].[O-]C(=O)C.[O-]C(=O)C; coordination form: O=C(C)O[Cd]OC(C)=O

Properties
Chemical formula	Cd(CH_{3}COO)_{2} (anhydrous); Cd(CH_{3}COO)_{2}·2H_{2}O (dihydrate)
Molar mass	230.500 g/mol (anhydrous); 266.529 g/mol (dihydrate)
Appearance	colorless crystals (anhydrous) white crystals (dihydrate)
Odor	acetic acid
Density	2.341 g/cm^{3} (anhydrous); 2.01 g/cm^{3} (dihydrate)
Melting point	255 °C (491 °F; 528 K) (anhydrous); 130 °C (266 °F; 403 K) (dihydrate decomposes)
Solubility in water	soluble (anhydrous), very soluble (dihydrate)
Solubility	soluble in methanol, ethanol (anhydrous) soluble in ethanol (dihydrate)
Magnetic susceptibility (χ)	−83.7·10^{−6} cm^{3}/mol

Structure
Crystal structure	monoclinic

Hazards
- GHS labelling
Pictograms	(GHS07: Exclamation mark) (GHS09: Environmental hazard) (GHS06: Toxic)
Signal word	Warning
Hazard statements	H302, H312, H332, H410
Precautionary statements	P261, P264, P270, P271, P273, P280, P301+P312, P302+P352, P304+P312, P304+P340, P312, P322, P330, P363, P391, P501
NFPA 704 (fire diamond)	3 1 0
- NIOSH (US health exposure limits)
PEL (Permissible)	[1910.1027] TWA 0.005 mg/m^{3} (as Cd)
REL (Recommended)	Ca
IDLH (Immediate danger)	Ca [9 mg/m^{3} (as Cd)]

Related compounds
Other anions	Cadmium fluoride Cadmium chloride Cadmium bromide Cadmium iodide
Other cations	Zinc acetate Mercury(II) acetate Silver acetate
- Except where otherwise noted, data are given for materials in their standard state (at 25 °C [77 °F], 100 kPa). verify (what is ?) Infobox references

Cadmium acetate is the chemical compound with the formula Cd(O_{2}CCH_{3})_{2}(H_{2}O)_{2}. The compound is marketed both as the anhydrous form and as a dihydrate, both of which are white or colorless. Only the dihydrate has been verified by X-ray crystallography.

== Preparation, reactions, and uses ==
It forms by treating cadmium oxide with acetic acid:

CdO + 2 CH_{3}CO_{2}H + H_{2}O → Cd(O_{2}CCH_{3})_{2}(H_{2}O)_{2}

It can also be prepared by treating cadmium nitrate with acetic anhydride.

Cadmium acetate has few applications. By reaction with trioctylphosphine selenide, it has often been used as a precursor to cadmium selenide and related semiconductors.

== Structure of the dihydrate ==
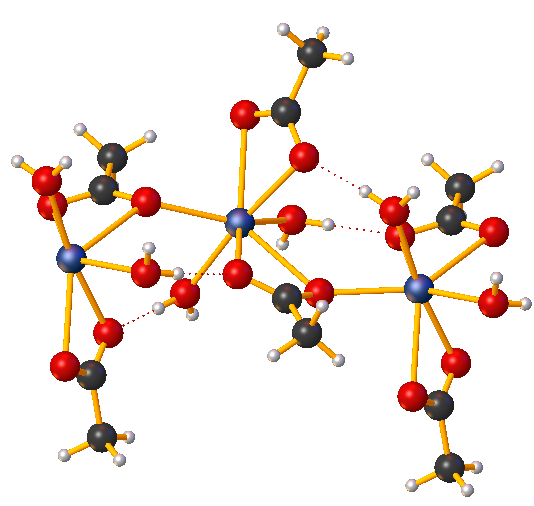
Fragment of the structure of cadmium diacetate dihydrate. Legend: red = O, black = C, blue = Cd.

Unlike the coordination geometry of zinc in zinc diacetate dihydrate, cadmium is seven coordinate in Cd(O_{2}CCH_{3})_{2}(H_{2}O)_{2}. It is a coordination polymer, featuring acetate ligands interconnecting cadmium centers.

== Safety ==
Cadmium compounds are considered Group 1 carcinogens by the IARC.
