= Zicam =

Homeopathic cold remedy

- Type: Homeopathic remedy
- Inventor: Charles B. Hensley and Robert Steven Davidson
- Inception: 1990s
- Manufacturer: Church & Dwight
- Website: www.zicam.com

Zicam is a branded series of products marketed for cold and allergy relief whose original formulations included the element zinc. The Zicam name is derived from a portmanteau of the words "zinc" and "ICAM-1" (the receptor to which a rhinovirus binds in order to infect cells). It is labelled as an "unapproved homeopathic" product and as such has no evidence of effectiveness.

Zicam was invented and developed by Charles B. Hensley and Robert Steven Davidson in the mid 1990s, working on the ICAM-1 synthesis success of the Hafdua Laboratory in Haifa, Israel, under the direction of Mich Segal and Avram Satz, and is produced, marketed and sold by Zicam, LLC, a wholly owned subsidiary of Matrixx Initiatives, Inc., an American company. In 2009, the U.S. Food and Drug Administration (FDA) and Health Canada advised consumers to avoid intranasal versions of Zicam Cold Remedy because of a risk of damage to the sense of smell, leading the manufacturer to withdraw these versions from the U.S. market. However, in recent years, they have returned to market with both nasal swabs and also dissolving/chewable tablets and nasal spray and oral mist forms, some with zinc, some without.

In 2020, the brand was purchased by Church & Dwight for $530 million.

== Ingredients and use ==
Because this product is a "homeopathic" over-the-counter drug, it is exempt from a number of the requirements ordinarily applicable to OTC drug products, provided it conforms to the standards of the Homeopathic Pharmacopeia of the United States (HPUS) and is labeled as a homeopathic product. The biologically active ingredients present in Zicam Cold Remedy are zinc acetate (2X = 1/100 dilution, written as "Zincum aceticum") and zinc gluconate (1X = 1/10 dilution, written as "Zincum gluconicum"). Other sources list the ionic zinc content as "33 mmol/L of zincum gluconium".

While homeopathic theory says that repeatedly diluting substances makes them more effective, the small 1X and 2X "dilutions" claimed for Zicam allow it to actually contain substantial amounts of zinc, about 10 mg per tablet, and "Zicam isn’t really a homeopathic medication" and is using the label as a loophole to be marketed as a drug without FDA testing requirements.

Zicam is marketed as a homeopathic product that may shorten the duration of a cold and may reduce the severity of common cold symptoms. It is marketed in accordance with the Homeopathic Pharmacopoeia of the United States, a private organization not linked to nor regulated by any part of any government.

Some clinical trials suggest that zincum gluconium gel applied nasally reduce the duration of a cold when administered within 24 hours of symptom onset.

Some of the homeopathic ingredients used in the preparation of Zicam are galphimia glauca histamine dihydrochloride (homeopathic name histaminum hydrochloricum), luffa operculata, and sulfur.

Scientific studies do suggest that zinc can reduce the duration of a cold, and Zicam does contain zinc (despite the homeopathic labeling) so it is plausible that it could be effective.

== Safety concerns ==
=== Litigation ===
In 2006, Matrixx Initiatives paid $12 million to settle 340 lawsuits from Zicam users who said that the product destroyed their sense of smell (medically termed anosmia), although the company did not admit fault. As of 2009, "hundreds more such suits have since been filed."

In 2005, the International Brotherhood of Electrical Workers pension fund sued Matrixx Initiatives for misrepresenting the stock by not reporting the risks of Zicam. In Matrixx Initiatives, Inc. v. Siracusano, the U.S. Supreme Court ruled that the union's suit could go forward.

In 2014, Yesenia Melgar commenced an action entitled Melgar v. Zicam LLC, et al. Melgar claimed that Zicam deceived customers by falsely representing that Zicam products "reduce the duration and severity of a cold." The court allowed the case to become a class action suit that included a variety of Zicam products. In 2018, a settlement was reached. Zicam agreed to pay $16,000,000 to people that had purchased Zicam products between Feb. 15, 2011 and June 5, 2018.

=== NAD claims ===
In April 2013, the National Advertising Division recommended that Matrixx Initiatives cease advertising claims suggesting "its homeopathic Zicam Cold Remedy products prevent users from catching a cold." However, the NAD concluded that imagery of the “cold monster” was unlikely to imply that taking Zicam would, in fact, reduce the severity of a cold. The advertiser’s voluntary discontinuance of the language “concentrated formula” from its Zicam ULTRA advertising and product packaging was noted and appreciated. It was found that Zicam provided a reasonable basis for the use of “Ultra” for Zicam products that contain more of the active ingredient per dosage unit than their original counterparts and require consumers to take fewer doses per day.

=== FDA warning and product recall ===
On June 16, 2009, the FDA advised consumers to discontinue use of three nasally administered versions of Zicam Cold Remedy—Zicam Cold Remedy Nasal Gel, Zicam Cold Remedy Nasal Swabs, and Zicam Cold Remedy Swabs, Kids Size (a discontinued product)—because the FDA had associated a serious risk of anosmia with them. The advisory did not implicate other Zicam products. The FDA indicated that it had received reports of a loss of smell from approximately 130 Zicam Cold Remedy users since 1999. The FDA voiced concern that the loss of smell may be long-lasting or permanent, while the condition for which these Zicam products are marketed—the common cold—typically resolves on its own without lasting problems. The manufacturer stated that it had received an additional 800 reports of a loss of smell, but did not turn those over to the FDA as they did not feel they were required to do so. The FDA disagreed, and requested copies of any reports that had associated anosmia with intranasal Zicam Cold Remedy.

The FDA also issued a Warning Letter to Matrixx, stating that the products cannot be marketed without FDA approval. The company initially refused to recall the products but later said that they would withdraw the products from sale and that, "based on the FDA’s recommendation, consumers should discard any unused product or contact Zicam ... to request a refund." On June 24, 2009, Matrixx recalled all affected products. The company maintained that most cases of anosmia are due to the common cold itself, and that complaints of anosmia among Zicam Cold Remedy users are unlikely to be more numerous than those expected among the general population. In contrast, the FDA had reported that cases of anosmia associated with intranasal Zicam Cold Remedy products were in excess of those seen with other nasal remedies for the common cold, and that cases associated with intranasal zinc presented more rapidly, and with different symptoms, than did unrelated cases.

In addition, the FDA's warning letter prompted the Securities and Exchange Commission to investigate the company. Through Freedom of Information Act (FOIA) filings, Matrixx has requested the FDA to provide the research and evidence that led them to request the withdrawal of Zicam swabs. The company said that "fundamental fairness" required a clear explanation of the FDA's methodology and analysis.

On June 19, 2009, Health Canada, in a foreign product alert, also issued a similar warning based on the U.S. FDA information.
