= Cadmium nitrate =

- Skeletal formula of cadmium chloride

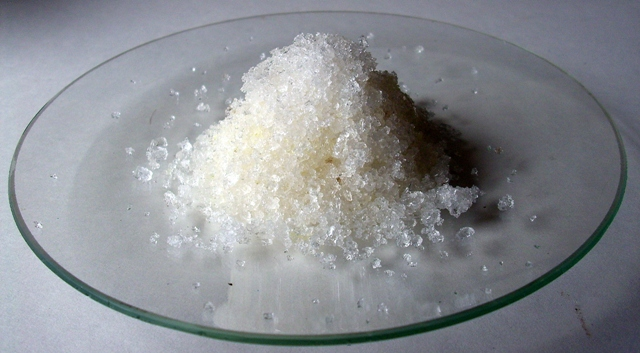
- Crystal of cadmium chloride

Names
- IUPAC name Cadmium(II) nitrate
- Other names Nitric acid, cadmium salt

Identifiers
CAS Number	10325-94-7; 10022-68-1 (tetrahydrate)
3D model (JSmol)	Interactive image
ChEBI	CHEBI:77732
ChemSpider	23498
ECHA InfoCard	100.030.633
EC Number	233-710-6
PubChem CID	25154 (anhydrous); 56924536 (tetrahydrate)
UNII	VF9RQV8VXV; 4VEL5V5LC0 (tetrahydrate)
UN number	3087, 2570
CompTox Dashboard (EPA)	DTXSID7044504
- InChI: InChI=1S/Cd.2NO3/c;2*2-1(3)4/q+2;2*-1 Key: XIEPJMXMMWZAAV-UHFFFAOYSA-N; InChI=1/Cd.2NO3/c;2*2-1(3)4/q+2;2*-1 Key: XIEPJMXMMWZAAV-UHFFFAOYAP
- SMILES: [Cd+2].[O-][N+]([O-])=O.[O-][N+]([O-])=O

Properties
Chemical formula	Cd(NO_{3})_{2}
Molar mass	236.42 g/mol (anhydrous); 308.48 g/mol (tetrahydrate)
Appearance	White crystals, hygroscopic
Odor	Odorless
Density	3.6 g/cm^{3} (anhydrous); 2.45 g/cm^{3} (tetrahdyrate)
Melting point	360 °C (680 °F; 633 K) at 760 mmHg (anhydrous); 59.5 °C (139.1 °F; 332.6 K) at 760 mmHg (tetrahydrate)
Boiling point	132 °C (270 °F; 405 K) at 760 mmHg (tetrahydrate)
Solubility in water	109.7 g/100 mL (0 °C); 126.6 g/100 mL (18 °C); 139.8 g/100 mL (30 °C); 320.9 g/100 mL (59.5 °C)
Solubility	Soluble in acids, ammonia, alcohols, ether, acetone 5 g/L in methanol
Magnetic susceptibility (χ)	−5.51·10^{−5} cm^{3}/mol (anhydrous) −1.4·10^{−4} cm^{3}/mol (tetrahydrate)

Structure
Crystal structure	Cubic (anhydrous); Orthorhombic (tetrahydrate)
Space group	Fdd2, No. 43 (tetrahydrate)
Point group	mm2 (tetrahydrate)
Lattice constant	α = 90°, β = 90°, γ = 90°

Hazards
- GHS labelling
Pictograms	(GHS06: Toxic) (GHS08: Health hazard) (GHS09: Environmental hazard)
Signal word	Danger
Hazard statements	H301, H330, H340, H350, H360, H372, H410
Precautionary statements	P201, P260, P273, P284, P301+P310, P310
NFPA 704 (fire diamond)	4 0 0 OX
- Lethal dose or concentration (LD, LC)
LD_{50} (median dose)	300 mg/kg (rats, oral)
- NIOSH (US health exposure limits)
PEL (Permissible)	[1910.1027] TWA 0.005 mg/m^{3} (as Cd)
REL (Recommended)	Ca
IDLH (Immediate danger)	Ca [9 mg/m^{3} (as Cd)]

Related compounds
Other anions	Cadmium acetate Cadmium chloride Cadmium sulfate
Other cations	Zinc nitrate Calcium nitrate Magnesium nitrate
- Except where otherwise noted, data are given for materials in their standard state (at 25 °C [77 °F], 100 kPa). verify (what is ?) Infobox references

Cadmium nitrate describes any of the related members of a family of inorganic compounds with the general formula Cd(NO_{3})_{2}·xH_{2}O. The most commonly encountered form being the tetrahydrate.The anhydrous form is volatile, but the others are colourless crystalline solids that are deliquescent, tending to absorb enough moisture from the air to form an aqueous solution. Like other cadmium compounds, cadmium nitrate is known to be carcinogenic. According to X-ray crystallography, the tetrahydrate features octahedral Cd^{2+} centers bound to six oxygen ligands.

== Uses ==
Cadmium nitrate is used for coloring glass and porcelain and as a flash powder in photography.

== Preparation ==
Cadmium nitrate is prepared by dissolving cadmium metal or its oxide, hydroxide, or carbonate, in nitric acid followed by crystallization:

CdO + 2HNO_{3} → Cd(NO_{3})_{2} + H_{2}O
CdCO_{3} + 2 HNO_{3} → Cd(NO_{3})_{2} + CO_{2} + H_{2}O
Cd + 4HNO_{3} → 2NO_{2} + 2 H_{2}O + Cd(NO_{3})_{2}

== Reactions ==
Thermal dissociation at elevated temperatures produces cadmium oxide and oxides of nitrogen. When hydrogen sulfide is passed through an acidified solution of cadmium nitrate, yellow cadmium sulfide is formed. A red modification of the sulfide is formed under boiling conditions.

When treated with sodium hydroxide, solutions of cadmium nitrate yield a solid precipitate of cadmium hydroxide. Many insoluble cadmium salts are obtained by such precipitation reactions.
