= Upfront (advertising) =

Gathering during advertising and sales periods especially of a television industry

An upfront is a gathering at the start of important advertising sales periods, held by network and streaming executives and attended by major advertisers and the media. Where once the Upfronts were all about the television industry, it has expanded to include streaming platforms. It is so named because of its main purpose, to allow marketers to buy television commercial airtime "up front", or several months before the television season begins.

The first upfront presentation was made by ABC in 1962, in an attempt to determine how advertisers felt about the network's new shows.

== United States ==
In the United States, the upfronts traditionally occurred in New York City during the third week of May, the last full week of that month's sweeps period. That has changed over the years with the 2017 season now starting in early March and running through May.

The networks announce their fall primetime schedules, including tentative launch dates (i.e., fall or midseason) for new television programming, which may be "picked up" the week before. The programming announcements themselves are usually augmented with clips from the new television series, extravagant musical numbers, comedic scenes, and appearances by network stars, and take place at grand venues such as Lincoln Center, Radio City Music Hall, or Carnegie Hall. It is also the time when it is announced (by virtue of not being on the fall schedule) which shows are canceled for the next season.

The broadcast upfront has seen momentous change as advertisers shifted their spending to digital platforms. While the advertising research firm Standard Media Index reported "softening" in 2017. That trend is slowing, according to the same report, which revealed that the last quarter of 2016 saw "the first glimpse of a flattening Digital market". Year-over-year sales were up 9% over last year's 35% growth in the same period. In the first quarter of 2016, digital gains hovered at 6% versus the 19% growth of the prior year. Big data and new software algorithms for targeting specific consumers may reverse the trend. M'Lou Walker, CEO of the maker of the Zicam brand of cold remedy, talked about using big data and analytics allowed her precise targeting, flexibility and measurable results of $1.50 of profit for every $1 spent on television advertising.

In recent years, the networks have mostly revealed this information to the public a few days before the actual presentation. Some cable networks present earlier in the spring since they usually program for the summer months, and these are much more confined to television trade press as far as public attention outside prestige projects. Streaming services associated with the networks (which often feature lower-cost plans with commercial advertising) may also announce new projects or releases at the same time, though other services like Netflix or Prime Video which subsist on subscriber fees without any advertising often market their programming under a different strategy altogether.

Historically, the fall television schedule was created to help the automotive industry promote new automobiles coming in the new model year, though many automakers often start new vehicle marketing during the Super Bowl in the present day.

Digital Content NewFronts are similar, but for original video content from the Internet, and managed by the Interactive Advertising Bureau. These were first held in 2008.

Since 2023, Paramount Global, now the owner of CBS, has opted to hold one-on-one events with advertisers in cities like Chicago, New York City and Los Angeles instead of the previously held large-scale event.

The CW, controlled by Nexstar Media Group, announced its fall 2024 schedule on May 16, 2024 for the 2024–25 season and did not have its upfront presentation, before The CW skipped its fall schedule since 2025.

=== Streaming ===
In 2021, the streaming platforms began integrating ad-supported models into their businesses. And legacy brands began to rebrand their positioning from "network" to "platforms" or "ecosystems." Fox had acquired Tubi, Viacom CBS had a variety of streaming platforms such as BET+, and NBCUniversal launched Peacock.

Netflix had its inaugural upfront in 2023, originally planned to roll out at the Paris Theatre in New York. However, the streamer introduced their ad-supported platform via a virtual presentation.

== Canada ==
Upfronts in Canada are similar but occur in either the last week of May or the first week of June, after networks have had a chance to buy Canadian rights to new American series. Usually all presentations are combined by each broadcast network/television system and their associated cable group of channels, traditionally meaning the Canadian Broadcasting Corporation (with CBC Television and Ici Radio-Canada Télé), Bell Media (owner of CTV and CTV 2), Corus Entertainment (owner of Global), Novoo, Groupe TVA (owner of TVA) all hold their own individual presentations.

== Australia ==
Upfronts (also referred to by the British television naming of showcase) in Australia, are a relatively new concept to the industry, introduced in the 2010s, and are not always a lavish affair. Upfronts are typically held between October and December before the start of the Southern Hemisphere's summer non-ratings period, highlighting programming for the next calendar year.

Unlike American upfronts, a detailed schedule for the year ahead is not typically released, as the Australian market, with a smaller population, is more apt to change schedules if a certain program schedule does not immediately work out, and the growth of their streaming platforms allows lower-rated import programs from the United States and United Kingdom to air without materially affecting the broadcast network. Announcements regarding new programs, axing confirmations and casting news are revealed to advertisers and the media. All three commercial networks (Seven, Nine, and 10) as well as both public broadcasters (ABC and SBS) hold upfront events for their suite of channels, with the ABC having also used the term showcase to describe the event. The dominant subscription platform Foxtel showcases programming airing across all their cable channels, rather than each cable network holding separate events.
