= Matrixx Initiatives, Inc. v. Siracusano =

- Supreme Court of the United States

Argued January 10, 2011 Decided March 22, 2011
- Full case name: Matrixx Initiatives, Inc., et al. v. Siracusano, et al.
- Docket no.: 09-1156
- Citations: 563 U.S. 27 (more) 131 S. Ct. 1309; 179 L. Ed. 2d 398

Case history
- Prior: Motion to dismiss granted, No. 2:04-cv-00886, 2005 WL 3970117 (D. Ariz. Dec. 15, 2005); reversed, 585 F.3d 1167 (9th Cir. 2009); cert. granted, 560 U.S. 964 (2010).

Holding
- A drug company's failure to make public reports of adverse drug reactions can constitute securities fraud even when the number of adverse reactions is not statistically significant.

Court membership
- Chief Justice John Roberts Associate Justices Antonin Scalia · Anthony Kennedy; Clarence Thomas · Ruth Bader Ginsburg; Stephen Breyer · Samuel Alito; Sonia Sotomayor · Elena Kagan

Case opinion
- Majority: Sotomayor, joined by unanimous

Laws applied
- Securities Exchange Act of 1934

Matrixx Initiatives, Inc. v. Siracusano, 563 U.S. 27 (2011), is a decision by the Supreme Court of the United States regarding whether a plaintiff can state a claim for securities fraud under §10(b) of the Securities Exchange Act of 1934, as amended, 15 U.S.C. §78j(b), and Securities and Exchange Commission Rule 10b-5, 17 CFR §240.10b-5 (2010), based on a pharmaceutical company's failure to disclose reports of adverse events associated with a product if the reports do not find statistically significant evidence that the adverse effects may be caused by the use of the product. In a 9–0 opinion delivered by Justice Sonia Sotomayor, the Court affirmed the Court of Appeals for the Ninth Circuit's ruling that the respondents, plaintiffs in a securities fraud class action against Matrixx Initiatives, Inc., and three Matrixx executives, had stated a claim under §10(b) and Rule 10b-5.

== Parties ==
- Petitioners: Matrixx Initiatives, Inc., Carl Johnson, William Hemelt, and Timothy Clarot (collectively "Matrixx")
- Respondents: James Siracusano and NECA-IBEW Pension Fund, on behalf of themselves and all others similarly situated who purchased Matrixx securities between October 22, 2003, and February 6, 2004

== Background ==
Petitioner Matrixx Initiatives, Inc., is a pharmaceutical company that sells cold remedy products through its wholly owned subsidiary Zicam, LLC. One of Zicam's main products is Zicam Cold Remedy (Zicam), which is produced in the form of a nasal spray or gel containing the active ingredient zinc gluconate. On April 27, 2004, respondents brought a class action suit against petitioners, alleging that petitioners violated §10(b) of the Securities Exchange Act and SEC Rule 10b-5 by failing to disclose reports that Zicam could cause anosmia, or loss of the sense of smell. Petitioners filed a motion to dismiss respondents' complaint for failure to state a claim. The District Court for the District of Arizona granted the motion without prejudice, reasoning that the allegation of user complaints were neither material nor statistically significant, and that respondents failed to allege scienter. Respondents appealed to the Court of Appeals for the Ninth Circuit, which issued a decision on October 28, 2009, to reverse and remand the judgement of the District Court. On March 23, 2010, petitioners filed their petition for a writ of certiorari to the Ninth Circuit with the United States Supreme Court.

== Decision ==
On March 22, 2011, Justice Sotomayor delivered the 9–0 opinion that held "[r]espondents have stated a claim under §10(b) and Rule 10b-5", affirming 585 F.3d 1167.

== Reactions to the decision ==
An article by Carl Bialik appearing in The Wall Street Journal on April 2, 2011, reported:

In [the] opinion, the justices said companies can't only rely on statistical significance when deciding what they need to disclose to investors.

Amen, say several statisticians who have long argued that the concept of statistical significance has unjustly overtaken other barometers used to determine which experimental results are valid and warrant public distribution. "Statistical significance doesn't tell you everything about the truth of the hypothesis you're exploring," says Steven Goodman, an epidemiologist and biostatistician at the Johns Hopkins Bloomberg School of Public Health.

Erik Olson, a partner at the Morrison & Foerster law firm in San Francisco which filed an amicus brief on behalf of BayBio, said that the court's ruling risks leaving companies without a clear guideline for deciding when they need to disclose adverse events. Olson, Stephen Thau, and Stefan Szpajda wrote a press release stating:

Life sciences companies and other public companies can learn at least two lessons from the decision. First and foremost, be careful what you say. As the Court emphasized, the securities laws focus on false or misleading speech. "[C]ompanies can control what they have to disclose under these provisions by controlling what they say to the market." (Slip Op. at 16). Rash or categorical comments are far more likely to form the basis for a lawsuit than measured, careful statements about the facts.

Second, life sciences companies should consult carefully with lawyers regarding specific disclosures and policies and practices for disclosing adverse events.
