= Beryllium nitrate =

Names
- Systematic IUPAC name Beryllium nitrate
- Other names Beryllium dinitrate

Identifiers
CAS Number	13597-99-4; 7787-55-5 (trihydrate)
3D model (JSmol)	Interactive image
ChemSpider	24337
ECHA InfoCard	100.033.678
EC Number	237-062-5
PubChem CID	26126
UNII	3VT1AXZ5LO; 1C20531KRZ (trihydrate)
UN number	2464
CompTox Dashboard (EPA)	DTXSID6065555
- InChI: InChI=1S/Be.2NO3/c;2*2-1(3)4/q+2;2*-1 Key: RFVVBBUVWAIIBT-UHFFFAOYSA-N
- SMILES: [Be+2].[O-][N+]([O-])=O.[O-][N+]([O-])=O

Properties
Chemical formula	Be(NO_{3})_{2}
Molar mass	133.021982 g/mol
Appearance	white solid
Odor	odorless
Density	1.56 g/cm^{3}
Melting point	60.5 °C (140.9 °F; 333.6 K)
Boiling point	142 °C (288 °F; 415 K) (decomposes)
Solubility in water	166 g/100 mL

Thermochemistry
Std enthalpy of formation (Δ_{f}H^{⦵}_{298})	−700.4 kJ/mol

Hazards
- NIOSH (US health exposure limits)
PEL (Permissible)	TWA 0.002 mg/m^{3} C 0.005 mg/m^{3} (30 minutes), with a maximum peak of 0.025 mg/m^{3} (as Be)
REL (Recommended)	Ca C 0.0005 mg/m^{3} (as Be)
IDLH (Immediate danger)	Ca [4 mg/m^{3} (as Be)]

Related compounds
Other cations	Magnesium nitrate Calcium nitrate Strontium nitrate Barium nitrate
- Except where otherwise noted, data are given for materials in their standard state (at 25 °C [77 °F], 100 kPa). verify (what is ?) Infobox references

Beryllium nitrate is an inorganic compound with the chemical formula Be(NO_{3})_{2}. It forms a tetrahydrate with the formula [Be(H_{2}O)_{4}](NO_{3})_{2}.The anhydrous compound, as for many beryllium compounds, is highly covalent. Little of its chemistry is known. Both the anhydrous form and the tetrahydrate are colourless solids that are soluble in water. The anhydrous form produces brown fumes in water, and produces nitrate and nitrite ions when hydrolyzed in sodium hydroxide solution.

== Synthesis and reactions ==
The straw-colored adduct Be(NO_{3})_{2}(N_{2}O_{4}) forms upon treatment of beryllium chloride with dinitrogen tetroxide in ethyl acetate:

BeCl_{2} + 3 N_{2}O_{4} → Be(NO_{3})_{2}(N_{2}O_{4}) + 2 NOCl

Upon heating, this adduct loses N_{2}O_{4} and produces colorless Be(NO_{3})_{2}. Further heating of Be(NO_{3})_{2} induces conversion to basic beryllium nitrate (Be_{4}O(NO_{3})_{6}).

Unlike the basic acetate, with its six lipophilic methyl groups, the basic nitrate is insoluble in most solvents.

The tetrahydrate is produced from the reaction of beryllium oxide or beryllium hydroxide with dilute nitric acid, followed by evaporation of the solution. The heating of the tetrahydrate does not yield the anhydrous form; instead it decomposes at 100 °C to beryllium hydroxide.

== Structure ==
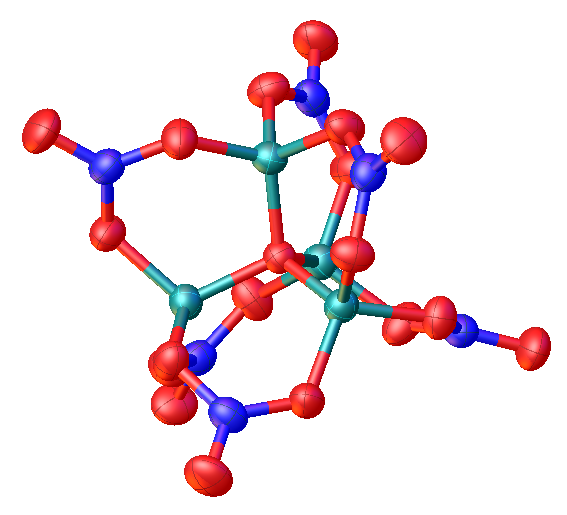
Structure of basic berylliium nitrate. Color scheme: red = O, blue = N, turquoise = Be.

Basic beryllium nitrate adopts a structure akin to that of basic beryllium acetate.

The tetrahydrate consists of isolated [Be(H_{2}O)_{4}]^{2+} tetrahederons and nitrate anions. The structure of the anhydrous form has not been elucidated yet.
