= Cadmium sulfite =

Chemical compound

Names
- Preferred IUPAC name Cadmium(2+) sulfite
- Other names Cadmium sulphite

Identifiers
CAS Number	13477-23-1
3D model (JSmol)	Interactive image
ChemSpider	11469971
ECHA InfoCard	100.033.410
EC Number	236-767-5
PubChem CID	22571170
CompTox Dashboard (EPA)	DTXSID40158938
- InChI: InChI=1S/Cd.H2O3S/c;1-4(2)3/h;(H2,1,2,3)/q+2;/p-2 Key: BYJADUSHMADYRW-UHFFFAOYSA-L
- SMILES: [O-]S(=O)[O-].[Cd+2]

Properties
Chemical formula	CdO_{3}S
Molar mass	192.47 g·mol^{−1}
Melting point	decomposes
Solubility in water	0.00221 mol/kg (0 °C); 0.00207 mol/kg (90 °C)

Related compounds
Related compounds	Cadmium sulfate
- Except where otherwise noted, data are given for materials in their standard state (at 25 °C [77 °F], 100 kPa). Infobox references

Cadmium sulfite is an inorganic compound with the formula CdO_{3}S. It is the cadmium salt of sulfurous acid. Several hydrates of cadmium sulfite are known, with the dihydrate (CdO_{3}S·2H_{2}O) being notable. Cadmium sulfite crystallizes from aqueous solutions.

As with most other cadmium compounds, it is toxic to the liver and reproductive system.

Cadmium sulfite has been used to prepare nanoparticles of cadmium oxide by the calcination of a cadmium sulfite emulsion.
