= Vanadium ditelluride =

- V^{4+}(Te^{2−})_{2}

Identifiers
| CAS Number | 35515-91-4 |
| 3D model (JSmol) | Interactive image |
| ChemSpider | 106189 |
| EC Number | 252-605-6 |
| PubChem CID | 118836 |
- InChI: InChI=1S/2Te.V Key: OOEISWVDKCZSMS-UHFFFAOYSA-N
- SMILES: [V](=[Te])=[Te]

Properties
| Chemical formula | Te_{2}V |
| Molar mass | 306.14 g·mol^{−1} |
| Appearance | gray solid |
- Except where otherwise noted, data are given for materials in their standard state (at 25 °C [77 °F], 100 kPa). Infobox references

Vanadium ditelluride is an inorganic compound with the formula VTe_{2}. It is a water-insoluble, gray-black solid. VTe_{2} has no applications but closely related layered dichalcogenides are subject of much research. VTe_{2} is the best studied vanadium telluride.

Vanadium ditelluride can be prepared by the reaction of the elements at 1000 °C. The reaction can also be conducted in molten salt. According to X-ray crystallography, it has a layered structure of the cadmium hydroxide packing motif.

A vanadium monotelluride (VTe) is also known (registry number 29888-22-0). It is a nonstoichiometric compound (as is the ditelluride), which crystallizes in the NiAs motif.
