= Basic beryllium acetate =

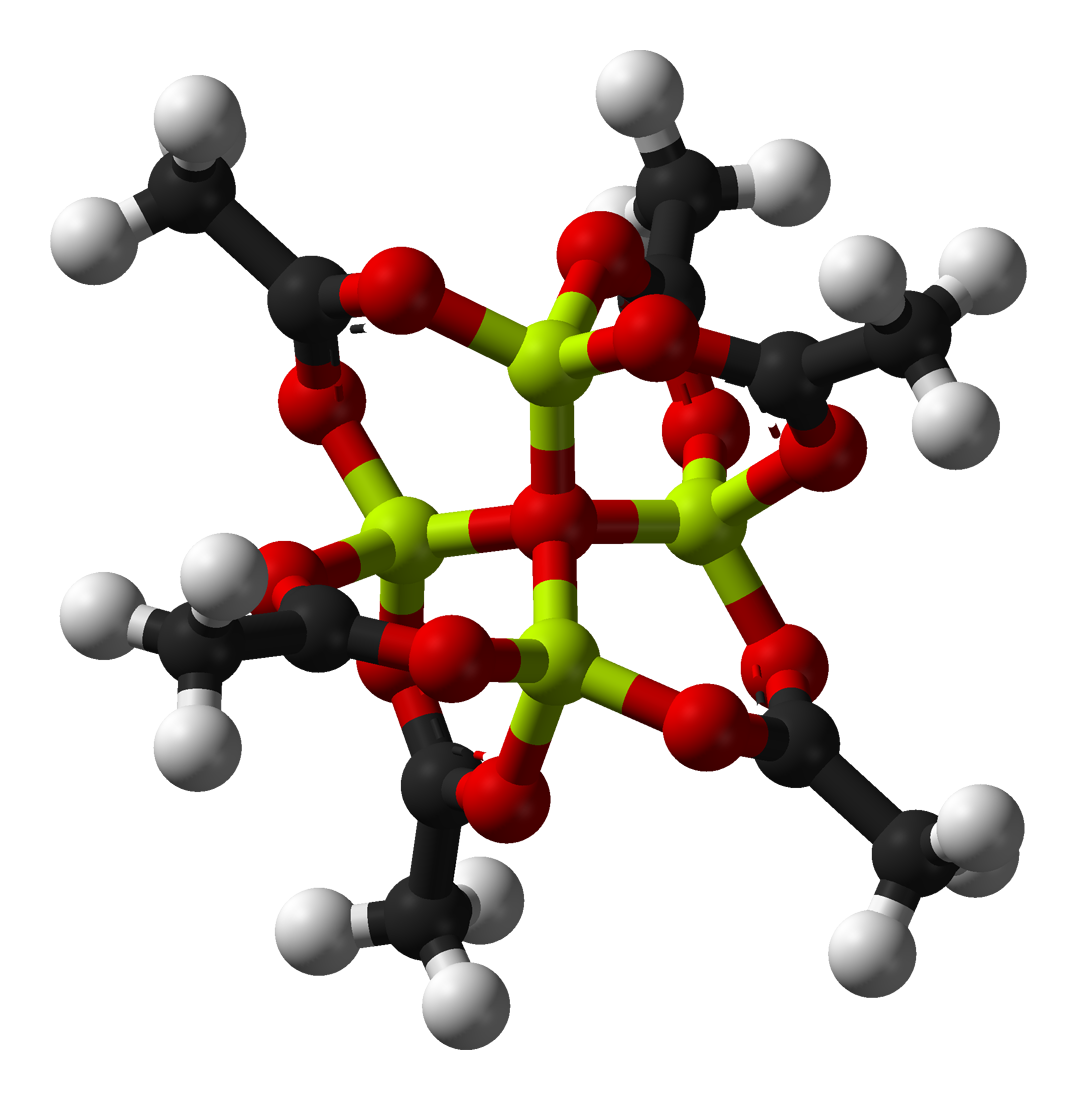

Names
- Systematic IUPAC name Hexa-μ-acetato(O,O')-μ4-oxo-tetraberyllium(II)
- Other names Beryllium oxyacetate Beryllium oxide acetate Basic beryllium acetate

Identifiers
CAS Number	19049-40-2
3D model (JSmol)	Interactive image
ChemSpider	2299653
ECHA InfoCard	100.038.881
EC Number	242-785-4
PubChem CID	3035396
UNII	NL5ZW5U7JX
CompTox Dashboard (EPA)	DTXSID80940617
- InChI: InChI=1S/6C2H4O2.4Be.O/c6*1-2(3)4;;;;;/h6*1H3,(H,3,4);;;;;/q;;;;;;4*+2;-2/p-6 Key: RKARILOACIIVIJ-UHFFFAOYSA-H
- SMILES: O1[C-](C)O[Be+2]([O-2]456)(O[C-](C)O2)O[C-](C)O[Be+2]34O[C-](C)O[Be+2]25O[C-](C)O[Be+2]16O[C-](C)O3

Properties
Chemical formula	C_{12}H_{18}Be_{4}O_{13}
Molar mass	406.3122 g/mol
Appearance	colorless
Melting point	285 °C (545 °F; 558 K)
Boiling point	330 °C (626 °F; 603 K)
Solubility in chloroform	soluble

Hazards
- Occupational safety and health (OHS/OSH)
Main hazards	highly toxic
- GHS labelling
Pictograms	(GHS06: Toxic) (GHS07: Exclamation mark) (GHS08: Health hazard) (GHS09: Environmental hazard)
Signal word	Danger
Hazard statements	H301, H315, H317, H319, H330, H335, H350, H372, H411
Precautionary statements	P203, P260, P264, P264+P265, P270, P271, P272, P273, P280, P284, P301+P316, P302+P352, P304+P340, P305+P351+P338, P316, P318, P319, P320, P321, P330, P333+P317, P337+P317, P362+P364, P391, P403+P233, P405, P501
- NIOSH (US health exposure limits)
PEL (Permissible)	TWA 0.002 mg/m^{3} C 0.005 mg/m^{3} (30 minutes), with a maximum peak of 0.025 mg/m^{3} (as Be)
REL (Recommended)	Ca C 0.0005 mg/m^{3} (as Be)
IDLH (Immediate danger)	Ca [4 mg/m^{3} (as Be)]
- Except where otherwise noted, data are given for materials in their standard state (at 25 °C [77 °F], 100 kPa). verify (what is ?) Infobox references

Basic beryllium acetate is the chemical compound with the formula Be_{4}O(O_{2}CCH_{3})_{6}. This compound adopts a distinctive structure, but it has no applications and has been only lightly studied. It is a colourless solid that is soluble in organic solvents.

== Preparation ==
It can be prepared by treating basic beryllium carbonate with hot acetic acid.

2 Be_{2}CO_{3}(OH)_{2} + 6 AcOH → Be_{4}O(AcO)_{6} + 5 H_{2}O + 2 CO_{2}

Basic beryllium acetate is insoluble in water but soluble in chloroform, consistent with it being nonpolar. It melts and sublimes in a vacuum without decomposition.

== Structure ==
"Basic acetates" consist of an ensemble of metal centres bound to a central oxide ion, and a collection of acetate ligands. Basic beryllium acetate has a tetrahedral Be_{4}O^{6+} core with acetates (CH_{3}CO_{2}^{−}) spanning each of the pairs of Be^{2+} centres. It consists of interlocking six-membered Be_{2}O_{3}C rings. The structure is relevant to its considerable stability (the compound is distillable at 330 °C).

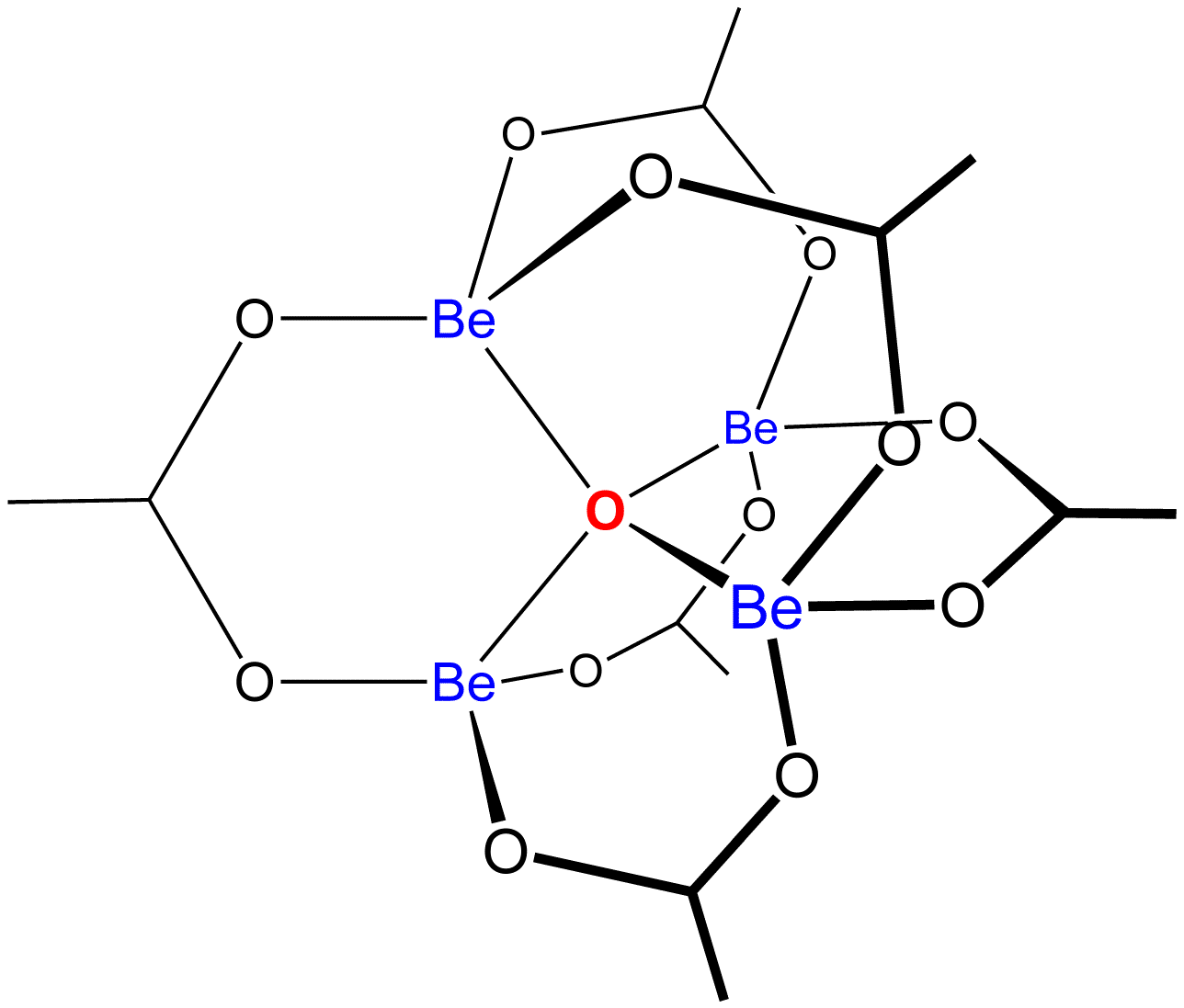
Schematic structure of basic beryllium acetate

== Uses ==
The solubility of the salt in organic solvents (chloroform) is useful to extract and purify beryllium rich fractions for many purposes. Basic beryllium acetate single crystals can easily be grown and are helpful to align x-ray diffractometers and also as a reference in protein crystallography.

== See also ==
- Basic zinc acetate
- Basic beryllium nitrate
