= Zinc gluconate =

Names
- Other names zincum gluconicum

Identifiers
CAS Number	4468-02-4
3D model (JSmol)	Interactive image
ChEBI	CHEBI:29708
ChEMBL	ChEMBL3833377
ChemSpider	391659
DrugBank	DB11248
ECHA InfoCard	100.022.489
EC Number	224-736-9
KEGG	D02390
PubChem CID	20543
UNII	U6WSN5SQ1Z
CompTox Dashboard (EPA)	DTXSID20894125
- InChI: InChI=1S/2C6H12O7.Zn/c2*7-1-2(8)3(9)4(10)5(11)6(12)13;/h2*2-5,7-11H,1H2,(H,12,13);/q;;+2/p-2/t2*2-,3-,4+,5-;/m11./s1 Key: WHMDKBIGKVEYHS-IYEMJOQQSA-L; InChI=1/2C6H12O7.Zn/c2*7-1-2(8)3(9)4(10)5(11)6(12)13;/h2*2-5,7-11H,1H2,(H,12,13);/q;;+2/p-2/t2*2-,3-,4+,5-;/m11./s1 Key: WHMDKBIGKVEYHS-QFKJHGNTBI
- SMILES: [Zn+2].[O-]C(=O)[C@H](O)[C@@H](O)[C@H](O)[C@H](O)CO.[O-]C(=O)[C@H](O)[C@@H](O)[C@H](O)[C@H](O)CO

Properties
Chemical formula	C_{12}H_{22}O_{14}Zn
Molar mass	455.685 g/mol
Melting point	172 to 175 °C (342 to 347 °F; 445 to 448 K)

Pharmacology
ATC code	A12CB02 (WHO)
- Except where otherwise noted, data are given for materials in their standard state (at 25 °C [77 °F], 100 kPa). verify (what is ?) Infobox references

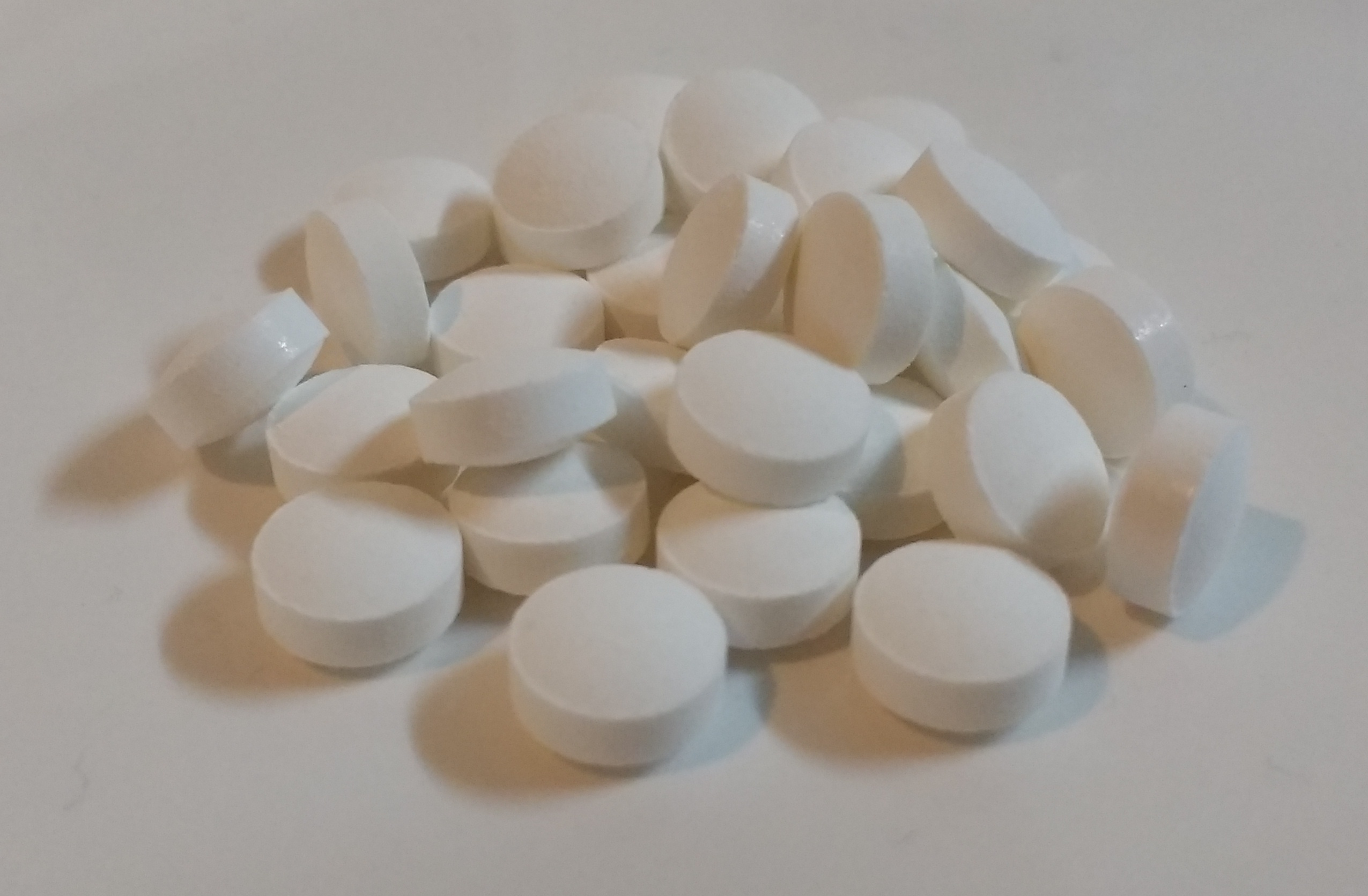
Zinc gluconate dietary supplements

Zinc gluconate is the zinc salt of gluconic acid. It is an ionic compound consisting of two anions of gluconate for each zinc(II) cation. Zinc gluconate is a popular form for the delivery of zinc as a dietary supplement providing 14.35% elemental zinc by weight.

Gluconic acid is found naturally, and is industrially made by the fermentation of glucose, typically by Aspergillus niger, but also by other fungi, e.g. Penicillium, or by bacteria, e.g. Acetobacter, Pseudomonas and Gluconobacter. In its pure form, it is a white to off-white powder. It can also be made by electrolytic oxidation, although this is a more expensive process. The advantages are a lower microbiological profile, and a more complete reaction, yielding a product with a longer shelf life.

== Zinc gluconate and the common cold ==
Zinc gluconate has been used in lozenges for treating the common cold. Controlled trials with lozenges which include zinc acetate have found it has the greatest effect on the duration of colds. Zinc has also been administered nasally for treating the common cold, but has been reported to cause anosmia in some cases.

== Safety concerns ==
Instances of anosmia (loss of smell) have been reported with intranasal use of some products containing zinc gluconate. In September 2003, Zicam faced lawsuits from users who claimed that the product, a nasal gel containing zinc gluconate and several inactive ingredients, negatively affected their sense of smell and sometimes taste. Some plaintiffs alleged experiencing a strong and very painful burning sensation when they used the product. Matrixx Initiatives, Inc., the maker of Zicam, responded that only a small number of people had experienced problems and that anosmia can be caused by the common cold itself. In January 2006, 340 lawsuits were settled for $12 million.

The U.S. Food and Drug Administration (FDA) considers zinc gluconate to be generally recognized as safe (GRAS) when used in accordance with good manufacturing practice, although this does not constitute a finding by the FDA that the substance is a useful dietary supplement. On 16 June 2009 the FDA "warned consumers to stop using and discard three zinc-containing Zicam intranasal products. The products may cause a loss of sense of smell. ... FDA is concerned that the loss of sense of smell may be permanent." Matrixx responded that the FDA's allegations were "unfounded and misleading", citing a lack of evidence from controlled tests that Zicam causes anosmia. In its warning, the FDA stated, "This warning does not involve oral zinc tablets and lozenges taken by mouth. Dietary zinc is also not subject to this warning."

== Veterinary use ==
A zinc gluconate-based product, also containing arginine, is used as a veterinary chemical castration drug. For dogs, the product is injected directly into the testicles. It has been sold under various brand names, including Neutersol and Esterilsol.
