= Zinc and the common cold =

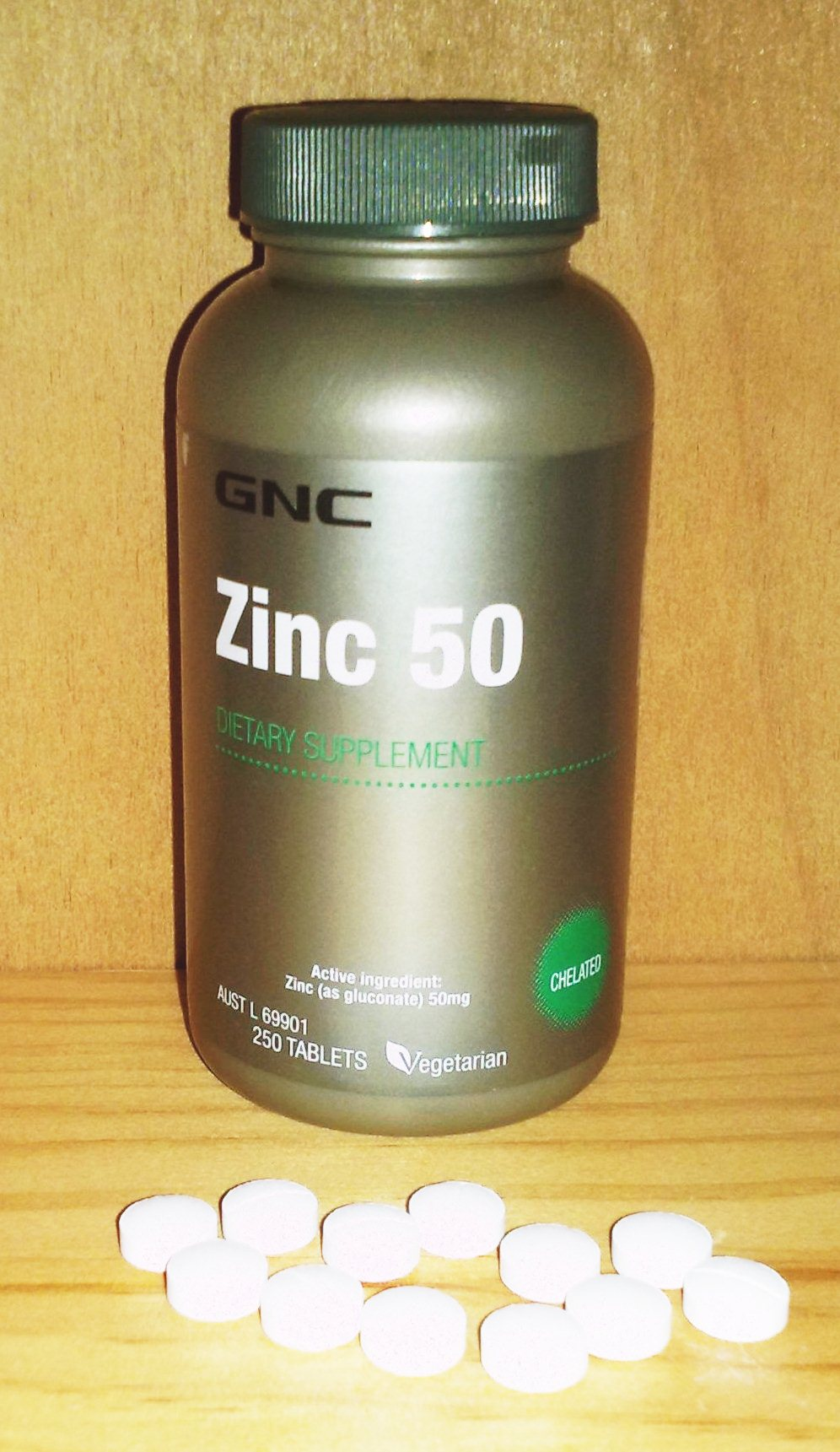
Zinc gluconate 50 mg tablets (GNC brand)

Zinc supplements (frequently zinc acetate or zinc gluconate lozenges) are a group of dietary supplements that are commonly used in an attempt to treat the common cold. There is no evidence that zinc supplementation prevents colds in the general population. There is evidence that properly composed zinc lozenges can shorten the duration of colds, but this effect has not been reported for ordinary oral zinc tablets. Adverse effects with zinc supplements by mouth include bad taste and nausea.

The intranasal use of zinc-containing nasal sprays has been associated with the loss of the sense of smell; consequently, in June 2009, the United States Food and Drug Administration (USFDA) warned consumers to stop using intranasal zinc.

The human rhinovirus – the most common viral pathogen in humans – is the predominant cause of the common cold. The hypothesized mechanism of action by which zinc reduces the severity and/or duration of cold symptoms is the suppression of nasal inflammation and the direct inhibition of rhinoviral receptor binding and rhinoviral replication in the nasal mucosa.

== Effectiveness ==
A statistical analysis which pooled seven randomized trials with 575 participants with naturally acquired colds concluded that there was no significant difference in efficacy between zinc acetate and zinc gluconate lozenges, there being on average 33% shorter colds in the zinc lozenge groups. In addition, the analysis found that there was no evidence that zinc doses over 100 mg/day led to greater efficacy in the treatment of the common cold.

Based on individual patient data of 199 common cold patients, zinc acetate lozenges indicated that such lozenges may shorten common cold duration by 36% (2.7 days), and increased the recovery rate by rate ratio 3.1.

Two statistical analyses highlighted that the effect of zinc lozenges varied depending on the initial length of the cold, with longer colds experiencing substantially greater reduction in duration that short colds.

A 2021 systematic review and meta-analysis on respiratory tract infections found that zinc modestly reduced symptom severity by day 3 and shortened illness duration by about two days, though the evidence was of low to very low certainty. Zinc offered minimal benefit in preventing infections and was associated with an increased risk of mild side effects, such as nausea and irritation.

A 2024 Cochrane Review found little to no evidence that zinc prevents the common cold or reduces symptom severity, though it may modestly shorten the duration of symptoms. Zinc lozenges were associated with a reduction in cold duration, but the evidence was of low certainty and varied across studies.

== Safety ==
High doses of zinc have been given to patients with various diseases for several months without concerns, and zinc is a standard treatment for Wilson's disease, which usually means taking high doses long-term.

There have been several cases of people using zinc nasal sprays and suffering a loss of sense of smell. In 2009 the US Food and Drug Administration issued a warning that people should not use nasal sprays containing zinc.

== Mechanism of action ==
The hypothesized mechanism of action by which zinc reduces the severity and/or duration of cold symptoms is the suppression of nasal inflammation and the direct inhibition of rhinoviral receptor binding and rhinoviral replication in the nasal mucosa.
