= Magnesium nitrate =

- Magnesium nitrate

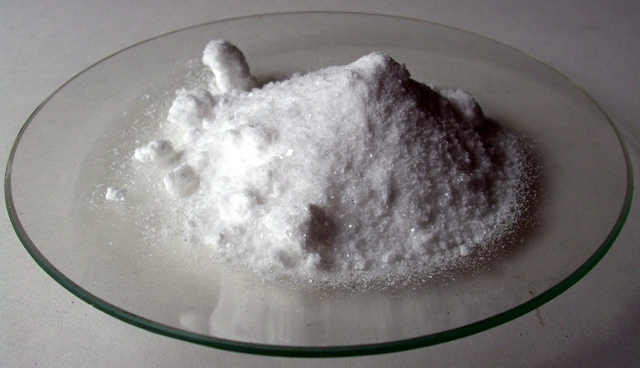

Names
- IUPAC name Magnesium nitrate
- Other names Nitromagnesite (hexahydrate)

Identifiers
CAS Number	10377-60-3; 15750-45-5 (dihydrate); 13446-18-9 (hexahydrate)
3D model (JSmol)	Interactive image
ChEBI	CHEBI:64736
ChemSpider	23415
ECHA InfoCard	100.030.739
EC Number	233-826-7
PubChem CID	25212
RTECS number	OM3750000 (anhydrous) OM3756000 (hexahydrate)
UNII	77CBG3UN78; V85K20LJMK (hexahydrate)
UN number	1474
CompTox Dashboard (EPA)	DTXSID4049664
- InChI: InChI=1S/Mg.2NO3/c;2*2-1(3)4/q+2;2*-1 Key: YIXJRHPUWRPCBB-UHFFFAOYSA-N; InChI=1/Mg.2NO3/c;2*2-1(3)4/q+2;2*-1 Key: YIXJRHPUWRPCBB-UHFFFAOYAA
- SMILES: [N+](=O)([O-])[O-].[N+](=O)([O-])[O-].[Mg+2]

Properties
Chemical formula	Mg(NO_{3})_{2}
Molar mass	148.32 g/mol (anhydrous); 184.35 g/mol (dihydrate); 256.41 g/mol (hexahydr.)
Appearance	White crystalline solid
Density	2.3 g/cm^{3} (anhydrous); 2.0256 g/cm^{3} (dihydrate); 1.464 g/cm^{3} (hexahydrate)
Melting point	129 °C (264 °F; 402 K) (dihydrate); 88.9 °C (hexahydrate)
Boiling point	330 °C (626 °F; 603 K) decomposes
Solubility in water	71 g/100 mL (25 °C)
Solubility	moderately soluble in ethanol, ammonia
Refractive index (n_{D})	1.34 (hexahydrate)

Structure
Crystal structure	cubic

Thermochemistry
Heat capacity (C)	141.9 J/mol K
Std molar entropy (S^{⦵}_{298})	164 J/mol K
Std enthalpy of formation (Δ_{f}H^{⦵}_{298})	−790.7 kJ/mol
Gibbs free energy (Δ_{f}G^{⦵})	−589.4 kJ/mol

Hazards
- Occupational safety and health (OHS/OSH)
Main hazards	Irritant
- GHS labelling
Pictograms	(GHS03: Oxidizing) (GHS07: Exclamation mark)
Signal word	Warning
Hazard statements	H272, H315, H319, H335
Precautionary statements	P210, P220, P221, P261, P264, P271, P280, P302+P352, P304+P340, P305+P351+P338, P312, P321, P332+P313, P337+P313, P362, P370+P378, P403+P233, P405, P501
NFPA 704 (fire diamond)	1 0 0 OX
Safety data sheet (SDS)	External MSDS

Related compounds
Other anions	Magnesium sulfate Magnesium chloride
Other cations	Beryllium nitrate Calcium nitrate Strontium nitrate Barium nitrate
- Except where otherwise noted, data are given for materials in their standard state (at 25 °C [77 °F], 100 kPa). verify (what is ?) Infobox references

Magnesium nitrate refers to inorganic compounds with the formula Mg(NO_{3})_{2}(H_{2}O)_{x}, where x = 6, 2, and 0. All are white solids. The anhydrous material is hygroscopic, quickly forming the hexahydrate upon standing in air. All of the salts are very soluble in both water and ethanol.

== Occurrence, preparation, structure ==
Being highly water-soluble, magnesium nitrate occurs naturally only in mines and caverns as nitromagnesite (hexahydrate form).

The magnesium nitrate used in commerce is made by the reaction of nitric acid and various magnesium salts.

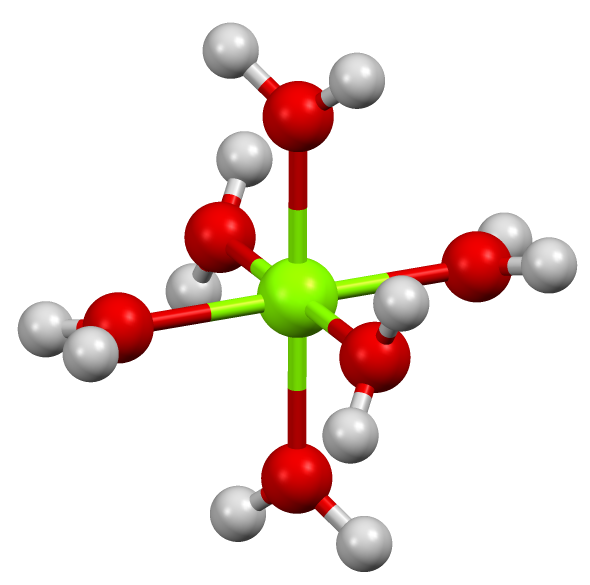
Structure of [Mg(H_{2}O)_{6}]^{2+} in the dinitrate salt.

== Use ==
The principal use is as a dehydrating agent in the preparation of concentrated nitric acid.

Its fertilizer grade has 10.5% nitrogen and 9.4% magnesium, so it is listed as 10.5-0-0 + 9.4% Mg. Fertilizer blends containing magnesium nitrate also have ammonium nitrate, calcium nitrate, potassium nitrate and micronutrients in most cases; these blends are used in the greenhouse and hydroponics trade.

== Reactions ==
Magnesium nitrate reacts with alkali metal hydroxide to form the corresponding nitrate:

Mg(NO_{3})_{2} + 2 NaOH → Mg(OH)_{2} + 2 NaNO_{3}.

Since magnesium nitrate has a high affinity for water, heating the hexahydrate does not result in the dehydration of the salt, but rather its decomposition into magnesium oxide, oxygen, and nitrogen oxides:

2 Mg(NO_{3})_{2} → 2 MgO + 4 NO_{2} + O_{2}.

The absorption of these nitrogen oxides in water is one possible route to synthesize nitric acid. Although inefficient, this method does not require the use of any strong acid.

It is also occasionally used as a desiccant.
