= Cadmium sulfate =

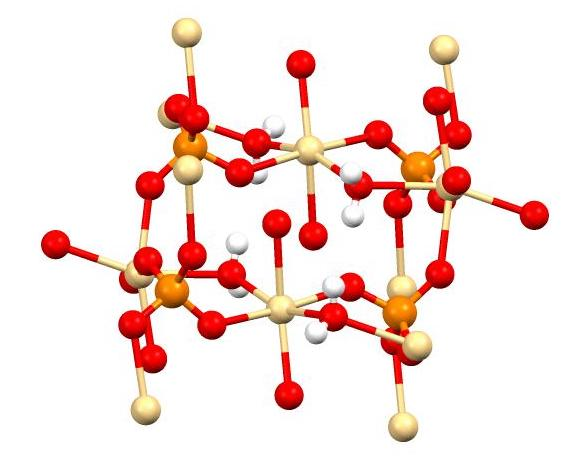
- Cadmium sulfate

Names
- IUPAC name Cadmium(II) sulfate
- Other names Sulfuric acid, cadmium salt (1:1),

Identifiers
CAS Number	10124-36-4; 7790-84-3 (octahydrate); 13477-21-9 (tetrahydrate)
3D model (JSmol)	Interactive image
ChEBI	CHEBI:50292; CHEBI:86157 (octahydrate)
ChemSpider	23335
ECHA InfoCard	100.030.288
EC Number	233-331-6
Gmelin Reference	8295
PubChem CID	24962 (anhydrous); 23618914 (tetrahydrate); 16211218 (octahydrate)
RTECS number	EV2700000
UNII	947UNF3Z6O
UN number	2570
CompTox Dashboard (EPA)	DTXSID1020229
- InChI: InChI=1S/Cd.H2O4S/c;1-5(2,3)4/h;(H2,1,2,3,4)/q+2;/p-2 Key: QCUOBSQYDGUHHT-UHFFFAOYSA-L; InChI=1/Cd.H2O4S/c;1-5(2,3)4/h;(H2,1,2,3,4)/q+2;/p-2 Key: QCUOBSQYDGUHHT-NUQVWONBAG
- SMILES: [Cd+2].[O-]S([O-])(=O)=O

Properties
Chemical formula	CdSO_{4}; CdSO_{4}·H_{2}O (monohydrate); 3CdSO_{4}·8H_{2}O (octahydrate)
Molar mass	208.47 g/mol (anhydrous); 226.490 g/mol (monohydrate); 769.546 g/mol (octahydrate)
Appearance	White hygroscopic solid
Odor	odorless
Density	4.691 g/cm^{3} (anhydrous); 3.79 g/cm^{3} (monohydrate); 3.08 g/cm^{3} (octahydrate)
Melting point	1,000 °C (1,830 °F; 1,270 K) (anhydrous); 105 °C (221 °F; 378 K) (monohydrate, decomposes); 40 °C (104 °F; 313 K) (octahydrate, decomposes)
Boiling point	(decomposes to basic sulfate and then oxide)
Solubility in water	anhydrous: 75 g/100 mL (0 °C (32 °F; 273 K)); 76.4 g/100 mL (25 °C (77 °F; 298 K)); 58.4 g/100 mL (99 °C (210 °F; 372 K)); monohydrate: 76.7 g/100 mL (25 °C (77 °F; 298 K)); octahydrate: very soluble
Solubility in methanol	slightly soluble
Solubility in ethyl acetate	slightly soluble
Magnetic susceptibility (χ)	−59.2×10^{−6} cm^{3}/mol
Refractive index (n_{D})	1.565
Viscosity	2.41 mPa·s (20 °C (68 °F; 293 K)); 1.49 mPa·s (40 °C (104 °F; 313 K))

Structure
Crystal structure	orthorhombic (anhydrous); monoclinic (mono & octahydrate)

Thermochemistry
Std molar entropy (S^{⦵}_{298})	123 J⋅mol^{−1}·K^{-1}
Std enthalpy of formation (Δ_{f}H^{⦵}_{298})	−935 kJ⋅mol^{−1}

Hazards
- GHS labelling
Pictograms	(GHS06: Toxic) (GHS08: Health hazard) (GHS09: Environmental hazard)
Signal word	Danger
Hazard statements	H301, H330, H340, H350, H360, H372, H410
Precautionary statements	P201, P202, P260, P264, P270, P271, P273, P280, P284, P301+P310+P330, P304+P340+P310, P308+P313, P403+P233, P405, P501
NFPA 704 (fire diamond)	3 1 1
Threshold limit value (TLV)	0.01 mg/m^{3} (total dust); 0.002 mg/m^{3} (respirable dust); (TWA)
- Lethal dose or concentration (LD, LC)
LD_{50} (median dose)	107 mg/kg (oral, rat, analgous compound)
LC_{50} (median concentration)	0.75 mg/L (goldfish, analgous compound)
- NIOSH (US health exposure limits)
PEL (Permissible)	TWA 0.005 mg/m^{3} (as Cd)
REL (Recommended)	TWA 0.005 mg/m^{3} (as Cd)
IDLH (Immediate danger)	9 mg/m^{3} (as Cd)
Safety data sheet (SDS)	Fisher Scientific; Sigma-Aldrich

Related compounds
Other anions	Cadmium acetate; Cadmium chloride; Cadmium nitrate
Other cations	Zinc sulfate; Calcium sulfate; Magnesium sulfate
- Except where otherwise noted, data are given for materials in their standard state (at 25 °C [77 °F], 100 kPa). verify (what is ?) Infobox references

Cadmium sulfate is the name of a series of related inorganic compounds with the formula CdSO_{4}·xH_{2}O. The most common form is the monohydrate CdSO_{4}·H_{2}O, but two other forms are known: the octahydrate (3CdSO_{4}·8H_{2}O) and the anhydrous salt (CdSO_{4}). All salts are colourless and highly soluble in water.

== Preparation ==
Cadmium sulfate hydrate can be prepared by the reaction of cadmium metal or its oxide or hydroxide with dilute sulfuric acid:

CdO + H_{2}SO_{4} → CdSO_{4} + H_{2}O
Cd + H_{2}SO_{4} → CdSO_{4} + H_{2}

The anhydrous material can be prepared using sodium persulfate:

Cd + Na_{2}S_{2}O_{8} → CdSO_{4} + Na_{2}SO_{4}

== Applications ==
Cadmium sulfate is used widely for the electroplating of cadmium in electronic circuits. It is also a precursor to cadmium-based pigment such as cadmium sulfide. It is also used for electrolyte in a Weston standard cell as well as a pigment in fluorescent screens.

== Structure ==
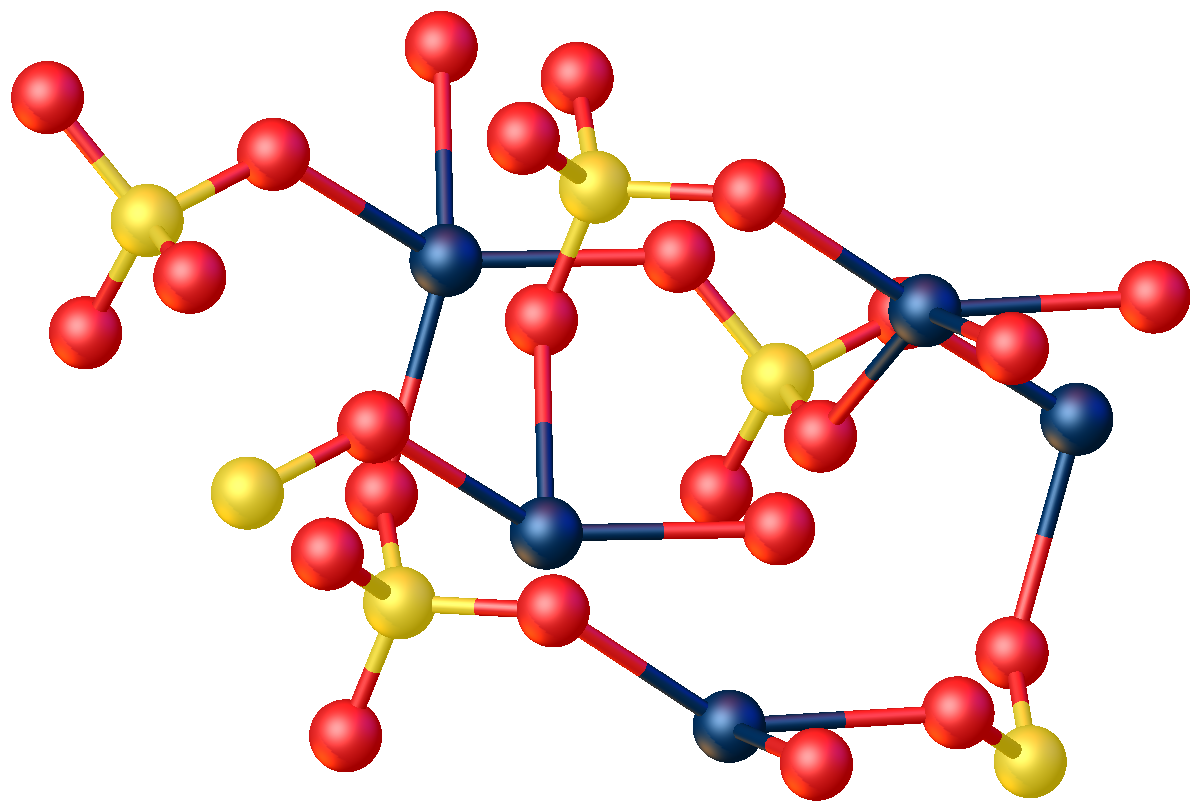
Portion of structure of CdSO4 illustrating the distorted tetrahedral geometry at Cd (dark blue spheres).

X-ray crystallography shows that CdSO_{4}·H_{2}O is a typical coordination polymer. Each Cd^{2+} center has octahedral coordination geometry, being surrounded by four oxygen centers provided by four sulfate ligands and two oxygen centers from the bridging water ligands.

== Occurrence ==
Cadmium sulfates occur as the following rare minerals drobecite (CdSO_{4}·4H_{2}O), voudourisite (monohydrate), and lazaridisite (the octahydrate).

== Safety ==
Cadmium sulfate (along with cadmium and its compounds) are classified as group 1 (human carcinogens) by IARC and have been identified as causing lung and prostate cancer as well as mutagenic effects in humans.
