= Cadmium oxide =

Inorganic compound with the formula CdO

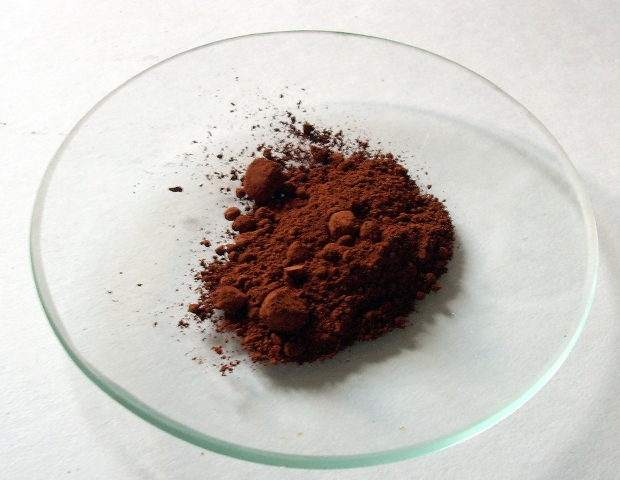

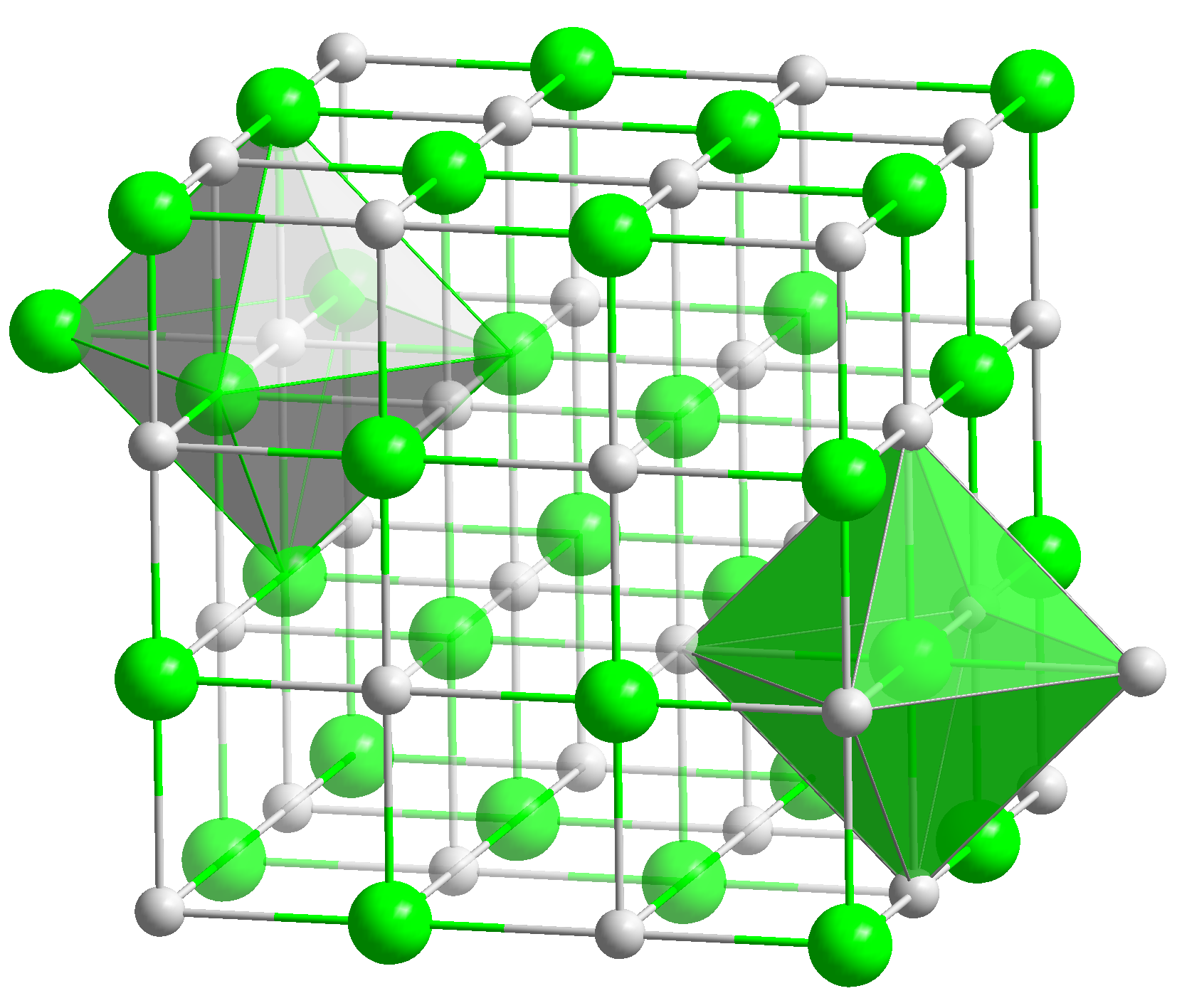

Names
- IUPAC name Cadmium oxide
- Other names Cadmium(II) oxide, Cadmium monoxide

Identifiers
CAS Number	1306-19-0
3D model (JSmol)	Interactive image
ChemSpider	14099
ECHA InfoCard	100.013.770
EC Number	215-146-2
PubChem CID	14782
RTECS number	EV1925000
UNII	0H3KWS8KJ3
UN number	2570
CompTox Dashboard (EPA)	DTXSID0024715
- InChI: InChI=1S/Cd.O Key: CXKCTMHTOKXKQT-UHFFFAOYSA-N; InChI=1/Cd.O/rCdO/c1-2 Key: CXKCTMHTOKXKQT-MBQGENNCAM
- SMILES: [Cd]=O

Properties
Chemical formula	CdO
Molar mass	128.413 g·mol^{−1}
Appearance	colorless powder (alpha form) red-brown crystal (beta form)
Odor	odorless
Density	8.15 g/cm^{3}(crystalline), 6.95 g/cm^{3} (amorphous) solid.
Melting point	900–1,000 °C (1,650–1,830 °F; 1,170–1,270 K) decomposition of amorphous form
Boiling point	1,559 °C (2,838 °F; 1,832 K) sublimation
Solubility in water	4.8 mg/L (18 °C)
Solubility	soluble in dilute acid slowly soluble in ammonium salts insoluble in alkalies
Vapor pressure	0.13 kPa (1000 °C); 2.62 kPa (1200 °C); 61.4 kPa (1500 °C)
Band gap	2.18 eV
Electron mobility	531 cm^{2}/V·s
Magnetic susceptibility (χ)	−3.0·10^{−5} cm^{3}/mol
Thermal conductivity	0.7 W/m·K
Refractive index (n_{D})	2.49

Structure
Crystal structure	cubic, cF8
Space group	Fm3̅m, No. 225
Lattice constant	a = 4.6958 Å

Thermochemistry
Heat capacity (C)	43.64 J/mol·K
Std molar entropy (S^{⦵}_{298})	55 J/mol·K
Std enthalpy of formation (Δ_{f}H^{⦵}_{298})	−258 kJ/mol
Gibbs free energy (Δ_{f}G^{⦵})	−229.3 kJ/mol

Hazards
- GHS labelling
Pictograms	(GHS06: Toxic) (GHS08: Health hazard) (GHS09: Environmental hazard)
Signal word	Danger
Hazard statements	H330, H341, H350, H361, H372, H410
Precautionary statements	P201, P260, P273, P281, P284, P310
NFPA 704 (fire diamond)	4 0 0
Flash point	Non-flammable
- Lethal dose or concentration (LD, LC)
LD_{50} (median dose)	72 mg/kg (oral, rat); 72 mg/kg (oral, mouse)
LC_{50} (median concentration)	500 mg/m^{3} (rat, 10 min); 2500 mg/m^{3} (rabbit, 10 min); 3500 mg/m^{3} (guinea pig, 10 min); 4000 mg/m^{3} (dog, 10 min); 780 mg/m^{3} (rat, 10 min); 340 mg/m^{3} (mouse, 10 min); 3000 mg/m^{3} (rabbit, 15 min); 3000 mg/m^{3} (guinea pig, 15 min); 400 mg/m^{3} (dog, 10 min)
- NIOSH (US health exposure limits)
PEL (Permissible)	[1910.1027] TWA 0.005 mg/m^{3} (as Cd)
REL (Recommended)	Ca
IDLH (Immediate danger)	Ca [9 mg/m^{3} (as Cd)]
- Safety data sheet (SDS)

Related compounds
Other anions	Cadmium sulfide Cadmium selenide Cadmium telluride
Other cations	Zinc oxide Mercury oxide
- Except where otherwise noted, data are given for materials in their standard state (at 25 °C [77 °F], 100 kPa). verify (what is ?) Infobox references

Cadmium oxide is an inorganic compound with the formula CdO. It is one of the main precursors to other cadmium compounds. It crystallizes in a cubic rocksalt lattice like sodium chloride, with octahedral cation and anion centers. It occurs naturally as the rare mineral monteponite. Cadmium oxide can be found as a colorless amorphous powder or as brown or red crystals. Cadmium oxide is an n-type semiconductor with a band gap of 2.18 eV (2.31 eV) at room temperature (298 K).

== Production and structure ==
Since cadmium compounds are often found in association with zinc ores, cadmium oxide is a common by-product of zinc refining. It is produced by burning elemental cadmium in air. Pyrolysis of other cadmium compounds, such as the nitrate or the carbonate, also affords this oxide. When pure, it is red, but CdO is unusual in being available in many differing colours due to its tendency to form defect structures resulting from anion vacancies. Cadmium oxide is prepared commercially by oxidizing cadmium vapor in air. Nanoparticles of cadmium oxide have been prepared from cadmium sulfite through calcination.

== Uses ==
Cadmium oxide is used in cadmium plating baths, electrodes for storage batteries, cadmium salts, catalysts, ceramic glazes, phosphors, and nematocide. Major uses for cadmium oxide are as an ingredient for electroplating baths, optoelectronic devices, and in pigments.

=== Transparent conductor ===
CdO is used as a transparent conductive material, which was prepared as a transparent conducting film as early as 1907 by Karl Baedeker. Cadmium oxide in the form of thin films has been used in applications such as photodiodes, phototransistors, photovoltaic cells, transparent electrodes, liquid crystal displays, IR detectors, and anti reflection coatings. CdO microparticles undergo bandgap excitation when exposed to UV-A light and is also selective in phenol photodegradation.

=== Cadmium plating ===
Most commercial electroplating of cadmium is done by electrodeposition from cyanide baths. These cyanide baths consist of cadmium oxide and sodium cyanide in water, which likely form cadmium cyanide and sodium hydroxide. A typical formula is 32 g/L cadmium oxide and 75 g/L sodium cyanide. The cadmium concentration may vary by as much as 50%. Brighteners are usually added to the bath and the plating is done at room temperature with high-purity cadmium anodes.

== Reactivity ==
CdO is a basic oxide and is thus attacked by aqueous acids to give solutions of [Cd(H_{2}O)_{6}]^{2+}. Upon treatment with strong alkaline solutions, [Cd(OH)_{4}]^{2−} forms. A thin coat of cadmium oxide forms on the surface of cadmium in moist air at room temperature. Cadmium will oxidize at room temperatures to form CdO. Cadmium vapor and steam will form CdO and hydrogen in a reversible reaction.
