= Zinc acetate =

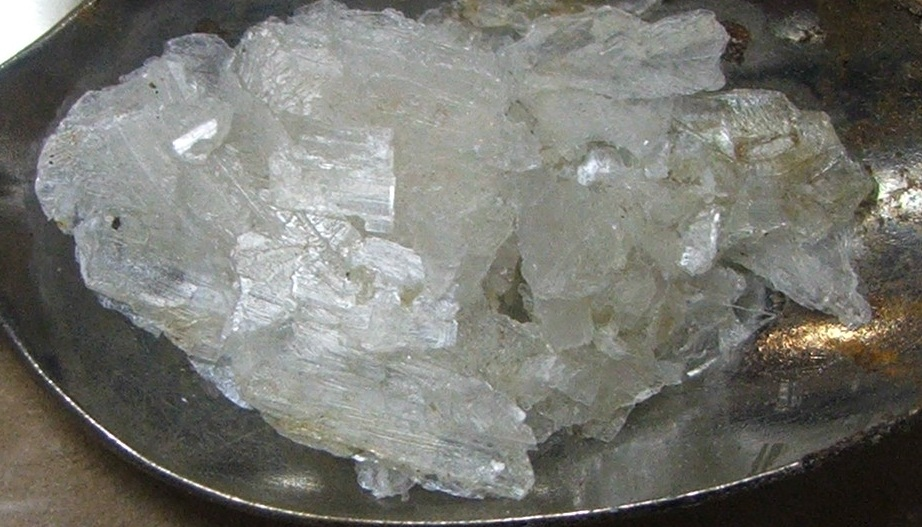
- Zinc acetate crystals

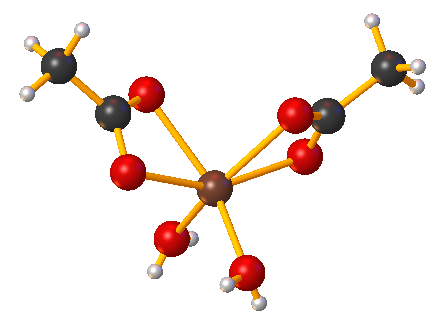

Names
- IUPAC name Zinc acetate
- Other names Acetic acid, Zinc salt Acetic acid, Zinc(II) salt Dicarbomethoxyzinc; Zinc diacetate

Identifiers
CAS Number	557-34-6 (anhydrous); 5970-45-6 (dihydrate)
3D model (JSmol)	Interactive image; basic zinc acetate: Interactive image
ChEBI	CHEBI:62984
ChEMBL	ChEMBL1200928
ChemSpider	10719
ECHA InfoCard	100.008.338
EC Number	209-170-2
E number	E650 (flavour enhancer)
PubChem CID	11192
RTECS number	ZG8750000
UNII	H2ZEY72PME (anhydrous); FM5526K07A (dihydrate)
UN number	3077
CompTox Dashboard (EPA)	DTXSID8038770
- InChI: InChI=1S/2C2H4O2.Zn/c2*1-2(3)4;/h2*1H3,(H,3,4);/q;;+2/p-2 Key: DJWUNCQRNNEAKC-UHFFFAOYSA-L; InChI=1/2C2H4O2.Zn/c2*1-2(3)4;/h2*1H3,(H,3,4);/q;;+2/p-2 Key: DJWUNCQRNNEAKC-NUQVWONBAP
- SMILES: [Zn+2].[O-]C(=O)C.[O-]C(=O)C; basic zinc acetate: C/C1=[O]/[Zn]\35O/C(C)=[O+]\[Zn]\26\[O]=C(C)/O[Zn]4(O1)/[O]=C(C)\O[Zn](=[O]/C(C)=[O]2)(O/C(C)=[O]3)[O]456

Properties
Chemical formula	Zn(CH_{3}COO)_{2}(H_{2}O)_{2} (dihydrate)
Molar mass	219.50 g/mol (dihydrate); 183.48 g/mol (anhydrous)
Appearance	White solid (all forms)
Density	1.735 g/cm^{3} (dihydrate)
Melting point	Decomposes at 237 °C (459 °F; 510 K) (dihydrate loses water at 100 °C)
Boiling point	decomposes
Solubility in water	43 g/100 mL (20 °C, dihydrate)
Solubility	1.5 g/100 mL (methanol)
Magnetic susceptibility (χ)	−101.0·10^{−6} cm^{3}/mol (+2 H_{2}O)

Structure
Coordination geometry	octahedral (dihydrate)
Molecular shape	tetrahedral

Pharmacology
ATC code	A16AX05 (WHO)

Hazards
- GHS labelling
Pictograms	(GHS05: Corrosive) (GHS07: Exclamation mark) (GHS09: Environmental hazard)
Signal word	Danger
Hazard statements	H302, H318, H319, H410, H411
Precautionary statements	P264, P270, P273, P280, P301+P312, P305+P351+P338, P310, P330, P337+P313, P391, P501

Related compounds
Other anions	Zinc chloride
Other cations	Copper(II) acetate
Related compounds	Basic beryllium acetate
- Except where otherwise noted, data are given for materials in their standard state (at 25 °C [77 °F], 100 kPa). verify (what is ?) Infobox references

Zinc acetate is a compound with the formula Zn(CH_{3}CO_{2})_{2}, which commonly occurs as the dihydrate Zn(CH_{3}CO_{2})_{2}·2H_{2}O. Both the hydrate and the anhydrous forms are colorless solids that are used as dietary supplements. When used as a food additive, it has the E number E650.

== Uses ==
Zinc acetate is a component of some medicines, e.g., lozenges for treating the common cold. Zinc acetate can also be used as a dietary supplement. As an oral daily supplement it is used to inhibit the body's absorption of copper as part of the treatment for Wilson's disease. Zinc acetate is also sold as an astringent in the form of an ointment, a topical lotion, or combined with an antibiotic such as erythromycin for the topical treatment of acne. It is commonly sold as a topical anti-itch ointment.

Zinc acetate is used as the catalyst for the industrial production of vinyl acetate from acetylene: CH_{3}CO_{2}H + C_{2}H_{2} → CH_{3}CO_{2}CH=CH_{2}. Approximately 1/3 of the worlds production uses this route, which because of its environmental impact, is mainly practiced in countries with relaxed environmental regulations such as China.

== Preparation ==
Zinc acetates are prepared by the action of acetic acid on zinc carbonate or zinc metal. Treatment of zinc nitrate with acetic anhydride is an alternative route.

== Structures ==
In anhydrous zinc acetate the zinc is coordinated to four oxygen atoms to give a tetrahedral environment, these tetrahedral polyhedra are then interconnected by acetate ligands to give a range of polymeric structures.

In the dihydrate, zinc is octahedral, wherein both acetate groups are bidentate.

== Reactions ==
Heating Zn(CH_{3}CO_{2})_{2} in a vacuum results in a loss of acetic anhydride, leaving a residue of "basic zinc acetate," with the formula Zn_{4}O(CH_{3}CO_{2})_{6}. It can also be prepared by a reaction of glacial acetic acid with zinc oxide. The cluster compound has a tetrahedral structure with an oxide ligand at its center. Basic zinc acetate is a common precursor to metal-organic frameworks (MOFs).

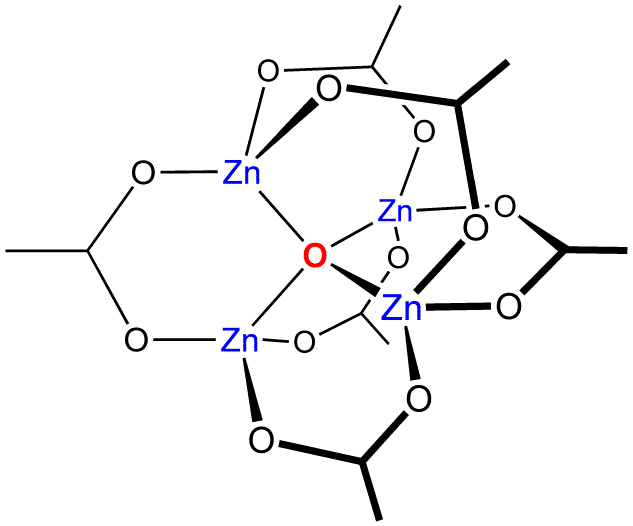

== See also ==
- Basic beryllium acetate - isostructural with basic zinc acetate
